= Ugratara Devalaya =

Temple in India

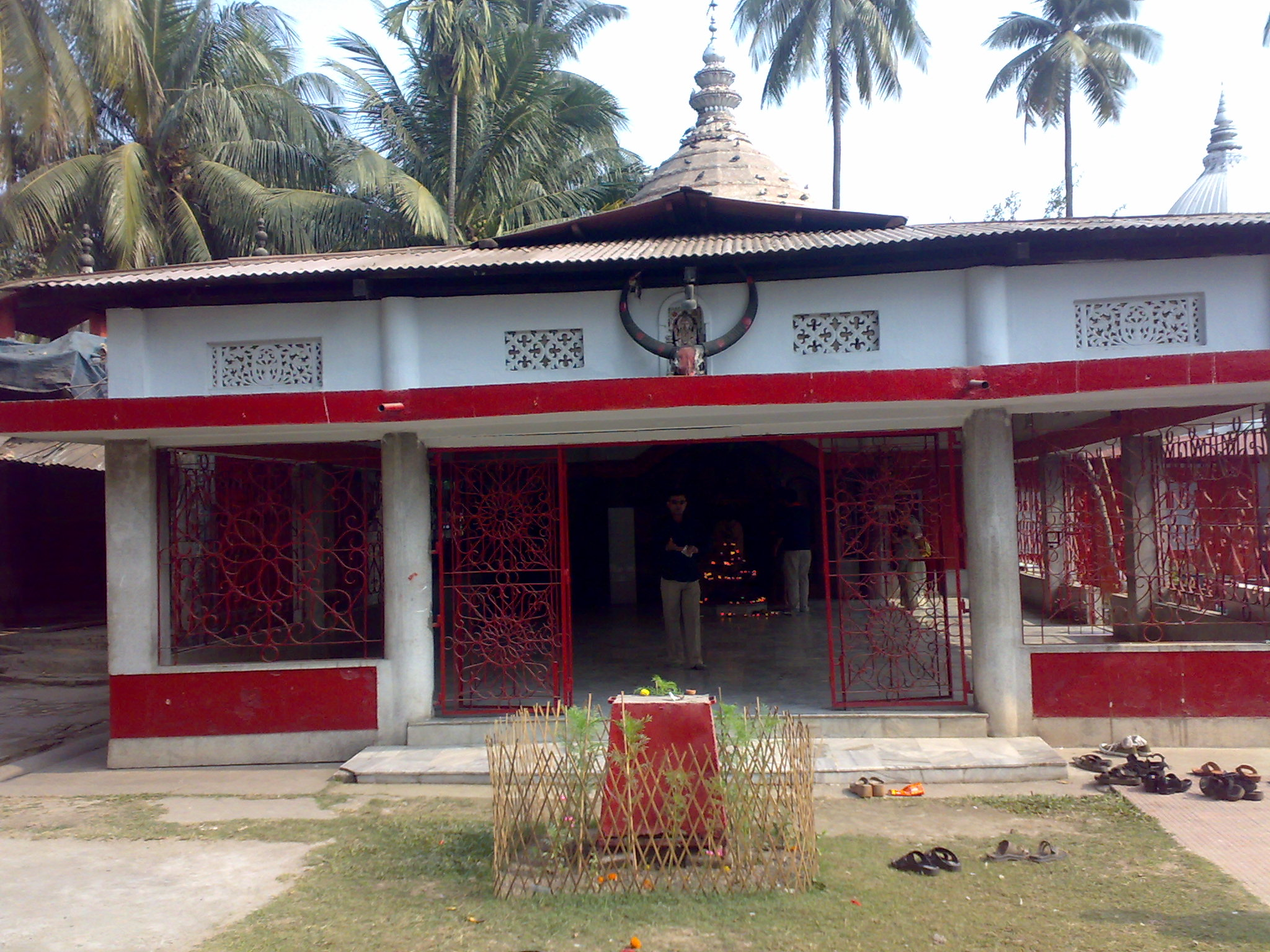

Religion
- Affiliation: Hinduism
- District: Kamrup metropolitan district
- Deity: Ugratara
- Festivals: Durga puja, Manasa puja

Location
- Location: Uzan Bazaar
- State: Assam
- Country: India
- Interactive map of Ugratara Devalaya
- Coordinates: 26°10′48″N 91°44′24″E

Architecture
- Type: Nilachal architecture
- Creator: Siva Singha
- Established: 1725; 301 years ago

Ugratara Devalaya is a temple dedicated to Ugratara located in the western side of Jor Pukhury tanks in the heart of Guwahati city in the Lotaxil (Latasil) locality in Northeast India. The Ugratara Temple in Uzan Bazaar in the eastern part of Guwahati, Assam, is a Shakti shrine. Legend has said that the navel of Sati, first consort of Shiva, is related to this temple. Ugratara in Assam is generally identified with Tiksna-Kanta, Eka-Jata, etc., of the Buddhist pantheon.

Dikkara vasini has two forms, Tikshna kantha and Lalitha kantha. Tikshna kantha is black and pot bellied, also called as Ugra Tara or Eka jata. Lalitha kantha is gracefully attractive, also called as Tamreshwari.

In the garbhagriha of Ugra Tara there is no image or idol of her. A small pit filled with water is considered as the Goddess. There is a Shivalaya beside Ugra Tara temple and a pond behind both temples.

The present temple of Ugra Tara was built by Ahom King Siva Singha in 1725 CE who had excavated a tank three years before. The tank, known as Jorepukhuri, is situated to the east of the temple. The tank still exists, though the upper section of the temple was destroyed by a devastating earthquake. This was however rebuilt by a local citizen.

== Sthala Purana ==
Once upon a time, Yama (Lord of the Hell) made a complaint to Brahma that nobody is coming to Hell from Kamarupa because of the sacredness of the area, despite committing sins. Brahma carried this complaint to Vishnu. Vishnu took them to Shiva. Lord Shiva ordered Goddess Ugra Tara to drive away all the people who are living in Kamakhya. She sent her army.

In the course of this drive, they laid their hands on Rishi Vasishtha who was meditating on Shiva at Sandhyachal. Vasishtha became angry and cursed Ugra Tara and Shiva. From then onwards all the Vedic (Shiva) sadhanas are given up in Kama rupa and Ugra Tara became a Goddess of Vamachara sadhana. All her army became Mlechhas.

== Sadhana ==
Ugra Tara is worshiped in general like Kamakhya. She likes liquor, flesh, Modaka, coconuts, and sugar cane.
