= Guwahati =

Metropolis in Assam, India

Guwahati Gauhati
- Metropolis
- Guwahati City
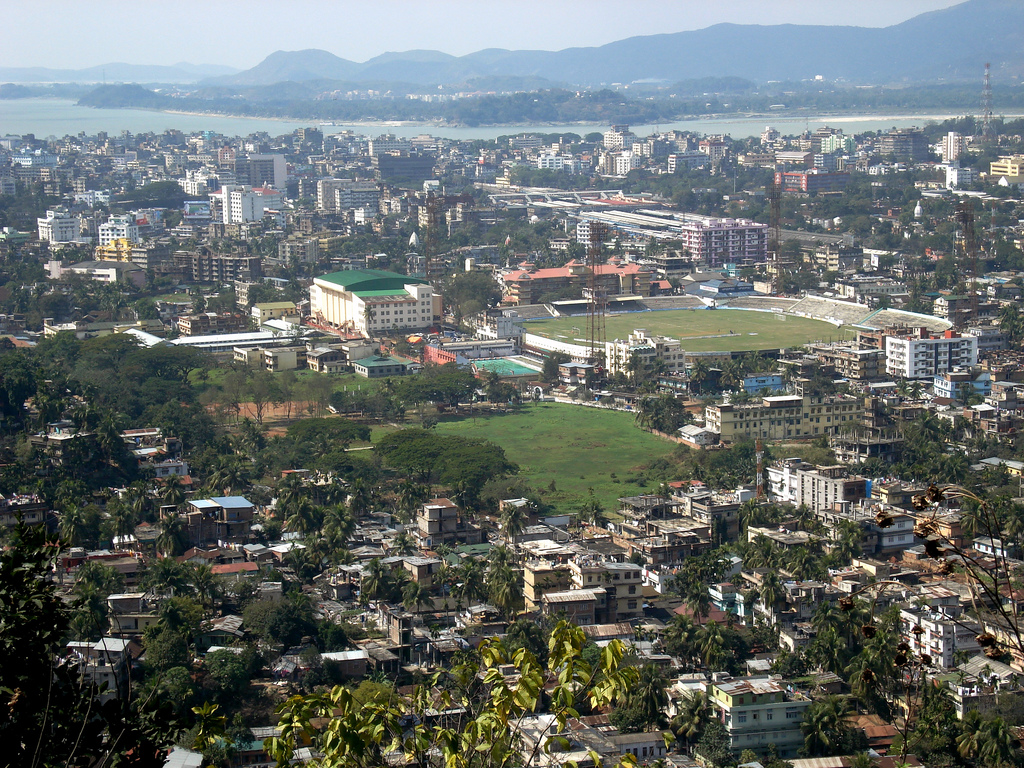
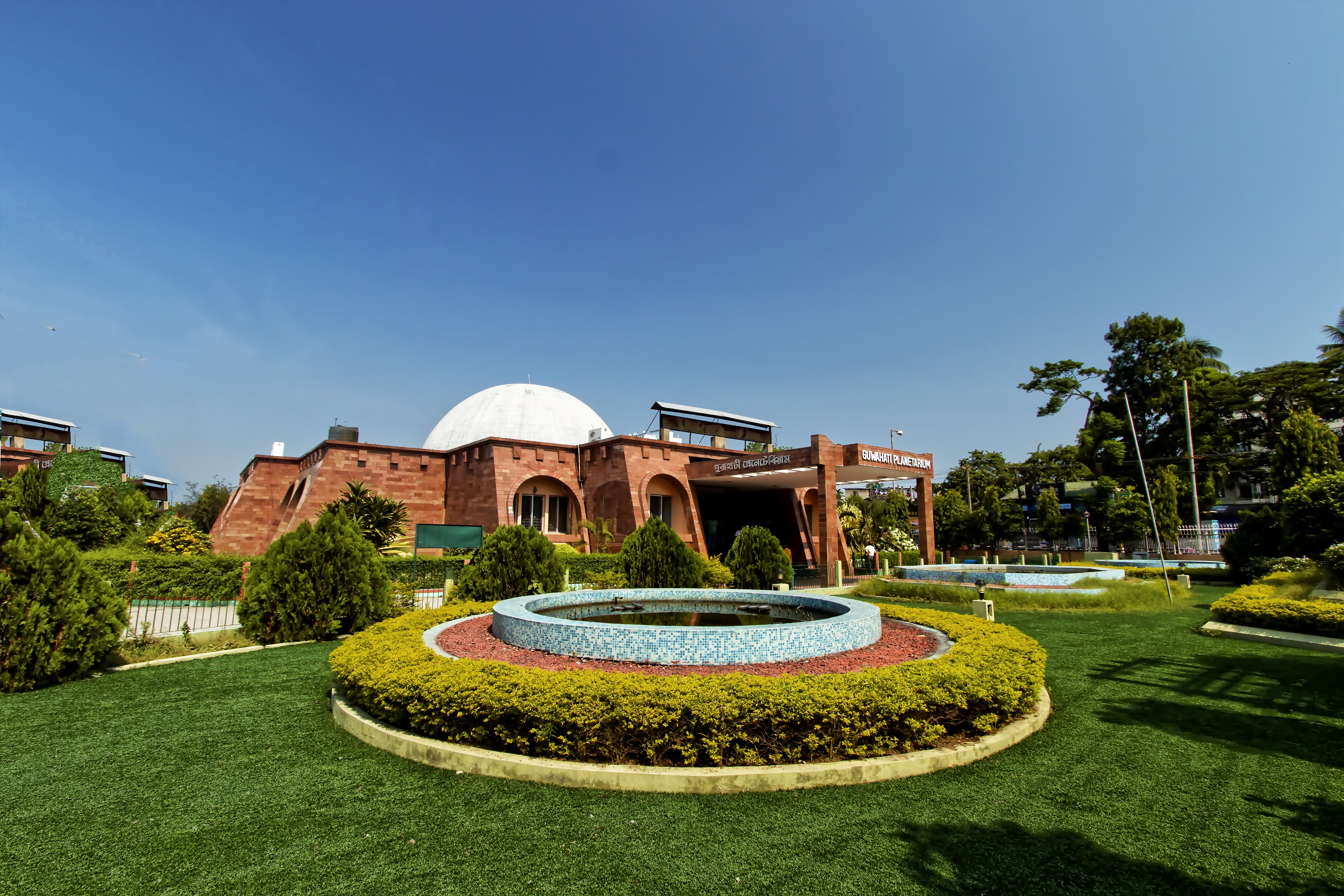
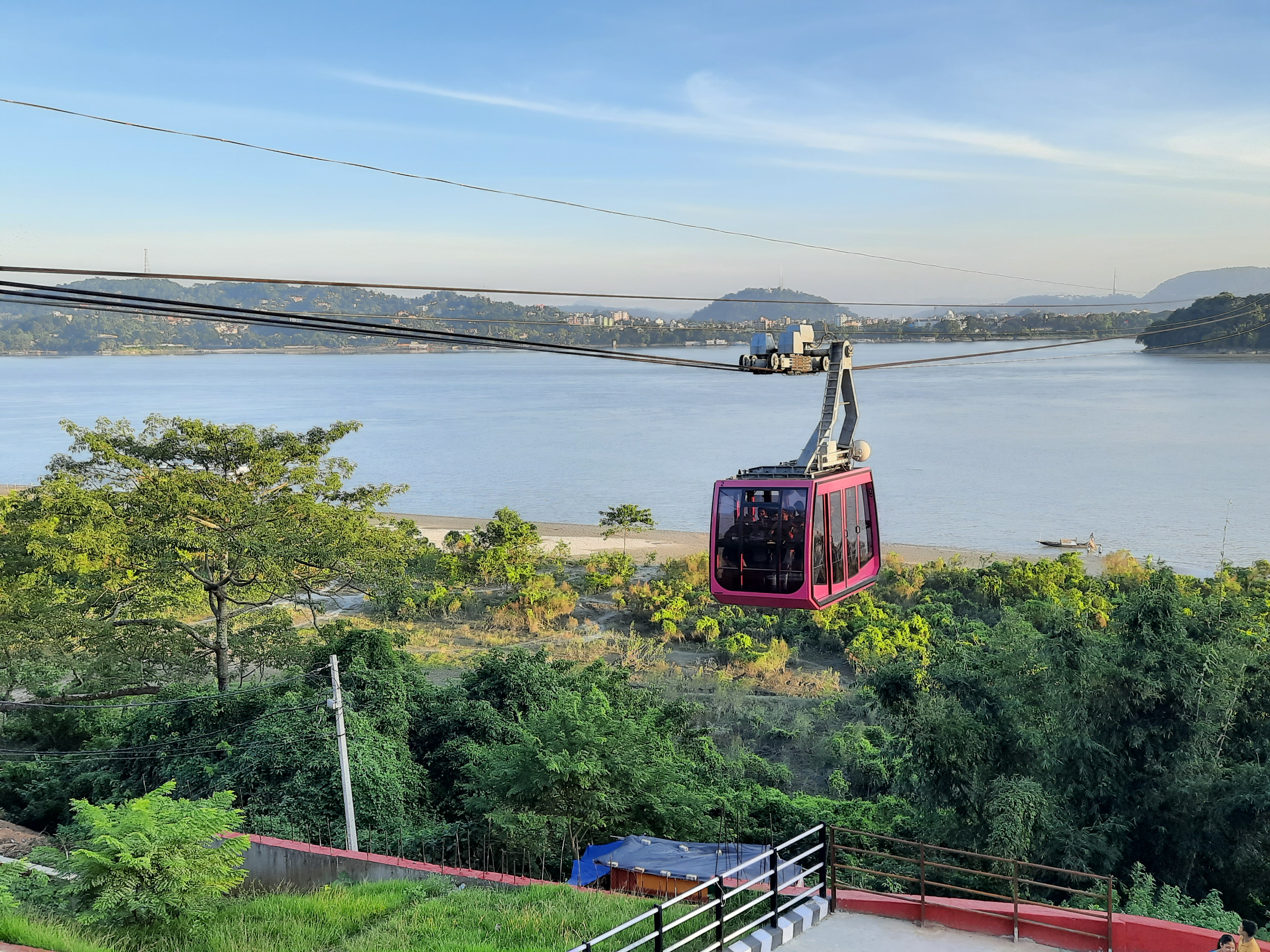
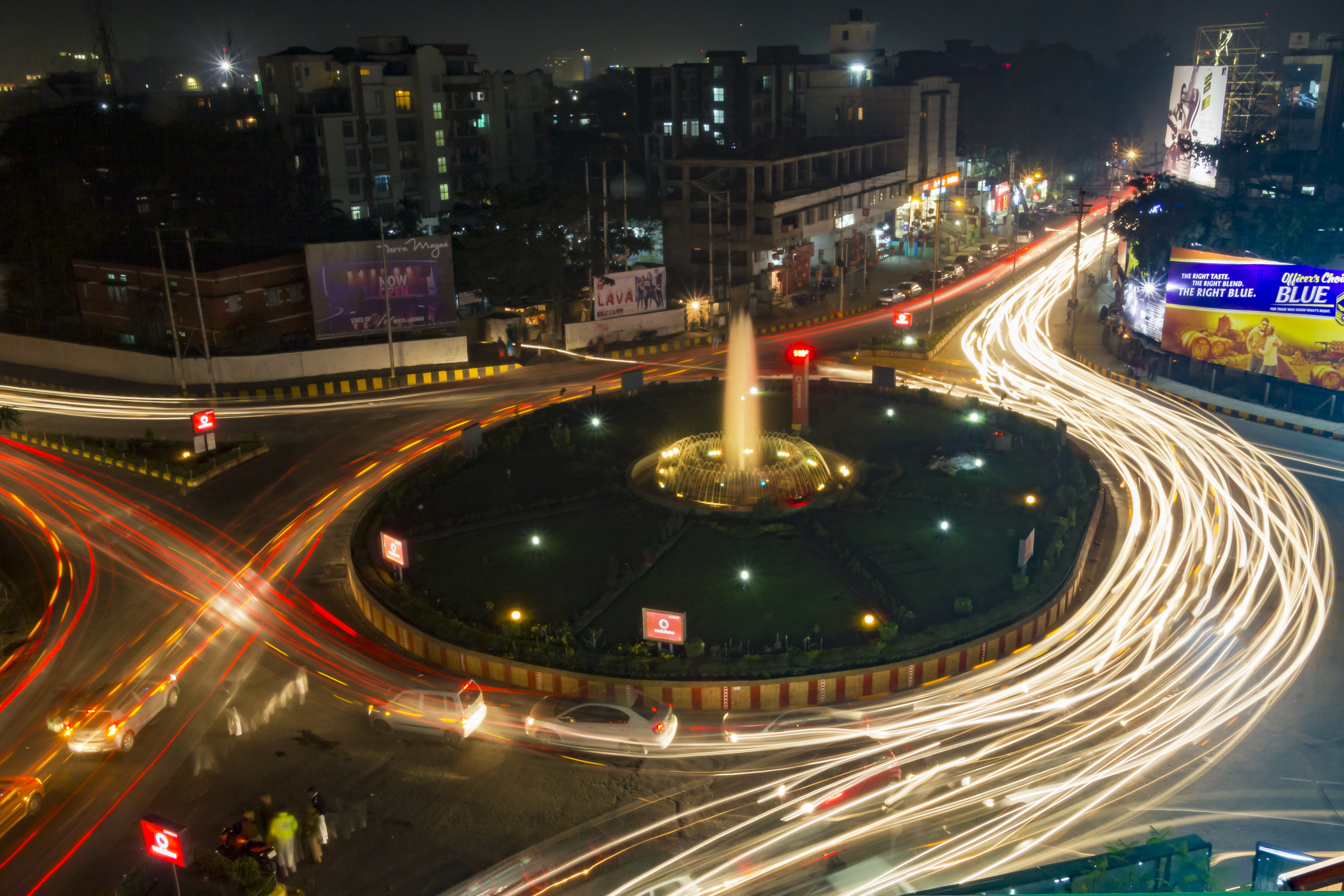
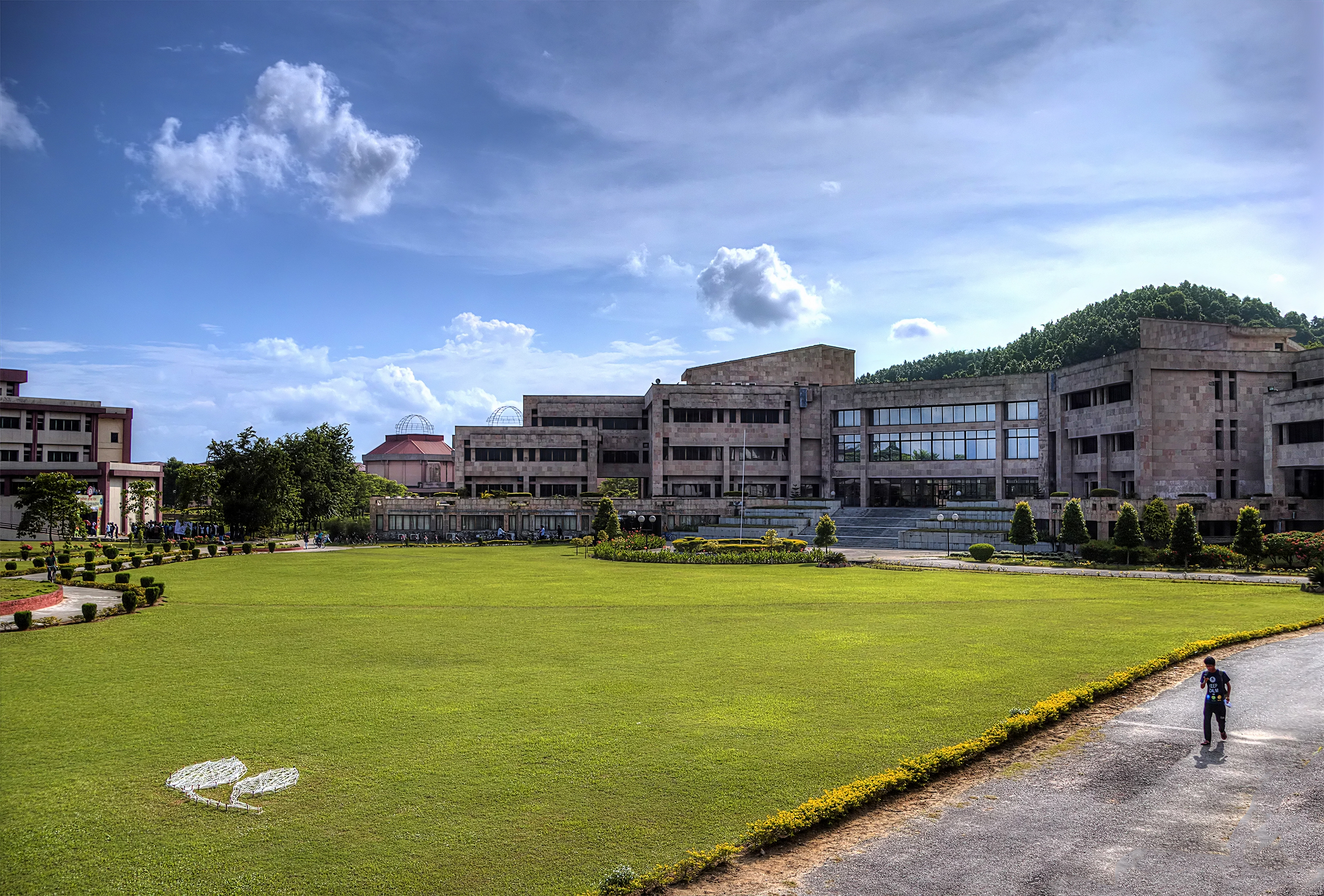
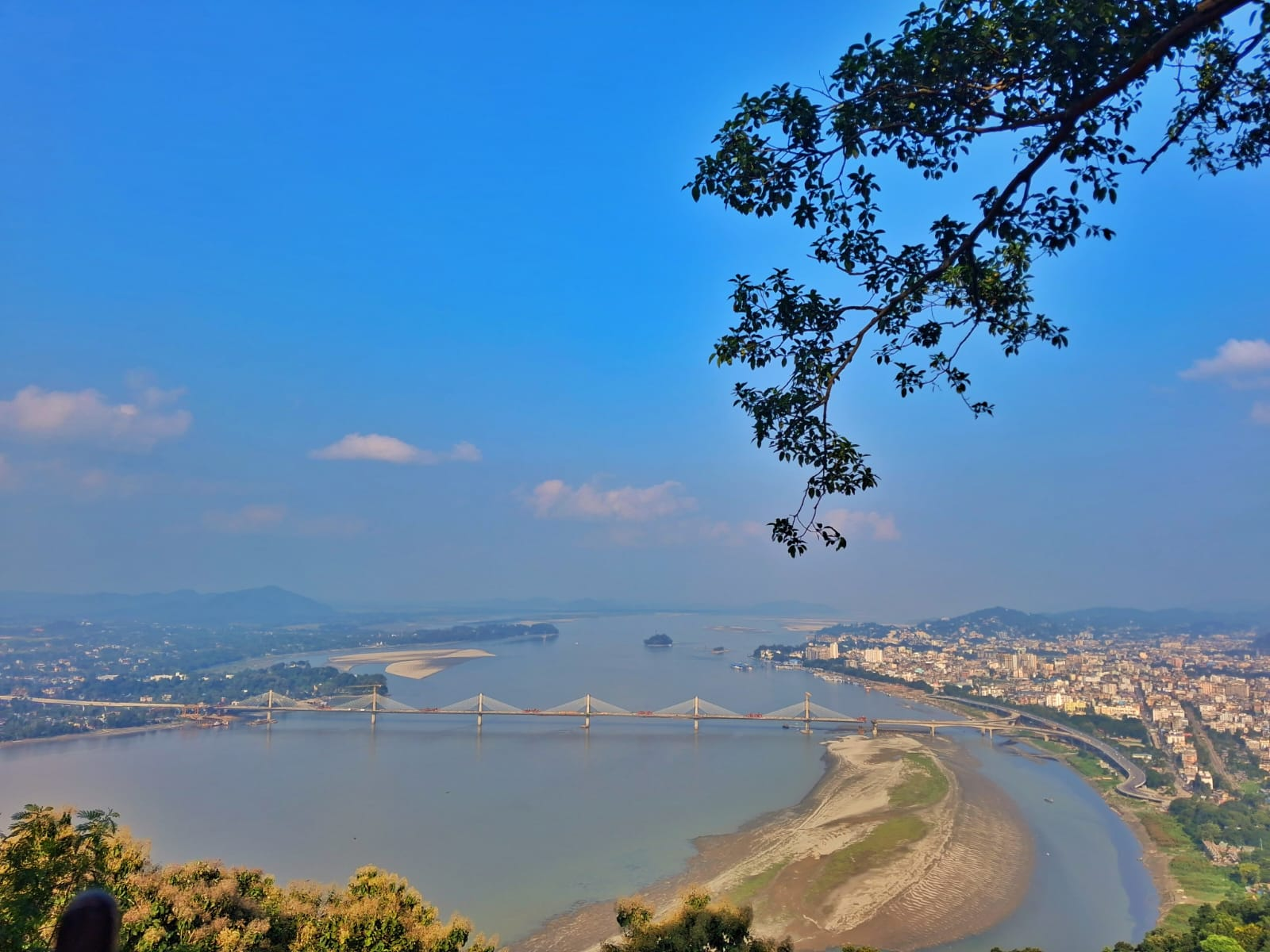
- Guwahati Aerial View Guwahati Planetarium Guwahati Ropeway Guwahati Club Area IIT Guwahati View of Guwahati from Nilachal Hill

- Seal
- Nicknames: Gateway to Northeast India, City of Temples, Light of the East
- Location in Assam Location in India Location in Asia
- Coordinates: 26°10′20″N 91°44′45″E
- Country: India
- State: Assam
- Division: Lower Assam
- District: Kamrup Metropolitan; Kamrup

Government
  - Type: Municipal Corporation
  - Body: Guwahati Municipal Corporation
  - Mayor: Mrigen Sarania (BJP)
  - Deputy Mayor: Smita Roy (BJP)

Area
  - Metropolis: 216.79 km^{2} (83.70 sq mi)
  - Metro: 262 km^{2} (101 sq mi)
- Elevation: 50–680 m (160–2,230 ft)

Population (2025)
  - Metropolis: 2,376,654
  - Rank: 33rd
  - Density: 10,963/km^{2} (28,394/sq mi)
- Demonym: Guwahatian
- Time zone: UTC+5:30 (IST)
- PIN: 781 0xx
- Telephone code: +91 - (0) 361
- ISO 3166 code: IN-AS
- Vehicle registration: AS-01 (Kamrup Metro) / AS-25 (Kamrup Rural and Dispur)
- HDI: ▲0.753 high
- Sex ratio: 940 ♀/ 1000 ♂
- City animal: Gangetic river Dolphin
- GDP (2024–2025): ₹10.93 lakh crore (US$120 billion)
- GDP per capita (2024–25): ₹699,398 (US$7,500)
- Climate: Cwa
- Precipitation: 2,054 millimetres (80.9 in)
- Official language: Assamese
- Literacy: 96.47%
- Website: gmc.assam.gov.in//

Guwahati (Assamese: [ɡua.ɦa.ti]), formerly known as Gauhati, is the largest city of the Indian state of Assam, and also the largest metropolis in northeastern India. Dispur, the capital of Assam, is in the circuit city region located within Guwahati and is the seat of the Government of Assam. The Lokpriya Gopinath Bordoloi International Airport is the 10th busiest in India, and the busiest in the Assam and North-East of the country. A major riverine port city along with hills, and one of the fastest growing cities in India, Guwahati is situated on the south bank of the Brahmaputra. Guwahati is divided into two separate revenue districts:-Kamrup Metropolitan district and Kamrup Rural district. The city is known as the "gateway to North East India".

The ancient cities of Pragjyotishpura and Durjaya (North Guwahati) were the capitals of the ancient state of Kamarupa. Many ancient Hindu temples like the Kamakhya Temple, Ugratara Temple, Basistha Temple, Doul Govinda Temple, Umananda Temple, Navagraha Temple, Sukreswar Temple, Rudreswar Temple, Manikarneswar Devalaya, Aswaklanta Temple, Dirgheshwari Temple, Lankeshwar Temple, Bhubaneswari Temple, Shree Ganesh Mandir, Shree Panchayatana Temple, Noonmati, and the like, are situated in the city, giving it the title of "The City of Temples". The noted Madan Kamdev is situated 30 kilometres (19 miles) from Guwahati.

Guwahati lies between the banks of the Brahmaputra River and the foothills of the Shillong plateau, with LGB International Airport to the west and the town of Narengi to the east. The North Guwahati area, to the northern bank of the Brahmaputra, is being gradually incorporated into the city limits. The Guwahati Municipal Corporation, the city's local government, administers an area of 523 square kilometres (202 sq mi). At the same time, the Guwahati Metropolitan Development Authority (GMDA) is the planning and development body of Greater Guwahati Metropolitan Area. Guwahati is the largest city in Northeast India.

The Guwahati region hosts diverse wildlife including rare animals such as Asian elephants, pythons, tigers, rhinoceros, gaurs, primate species, and endangered birds.

== Etymology ==
Guwahati derives its name from the Assamese word "Guwa" (Assamese: গুৱা) derived from the Sanskrit word Guvāka (Devanagari: गुवाक), meaning areca nut and its plant and "Hati" (Assamese: হাটী) meaning rows, the rows of areca nut trees.

== History ==
=== Legends ===
Naraka, also known as Narakāsura, and Bhaumāsura was an asura king, the legendary progenitor of all three dynasties of Pragjyotisha-Kamarupa, and the founding ruler of the legendary Bhauma dynasty of Pragjyotisha. Though the myths about Naraka are first mentioned in the Mahabharata, later texts embellish them. According to later post-Vedic texts such as the Brahma Purana and Vishnu Purana, he was the son of Bhudevi, fathered by the Varaha incarnation of Vishnu. He is claimed as one who established Pragjyotisha. The pious Naraka became evil due to his association with an asura named Banasura of Śoṇitapura, and hence the suffix 'asura' (demon) was added to his name. He was slain by Krishna and Satyabhama, who was the incarnate of Bhudevi.

The 10th/11th-century Kalika Purana embellishes the myths further and he is claimed to have come from Mithila and said to have established the kingdom of Pragjyotisha after overthrowing the last of the Kirata kings, Ghatakasura, of the Danava dynasty. It was foretold that he would be destroyed by a later incarnation of Vishnu. His mother, the earth, sought the boon from Vishnu that her son should have a long life, and that he should be all-powerful. Vishnu granted these boons.

The legends of Naraka is important in the history of Assam, particularly Kamarupa; since Narakasura is cited as the progenitor of all three dynasties that ruled Kamarupa in historical times. A hill, to the south of Guwahati is named after him. He is also associated with the Hindu belief of the shakti goddess and place of worship Kamakhya.

Narakāsura's son Bhagadatta—of Mahabharata fame—succeeded him. As per the legends constructed in the Yogini Tantra, the tank Dighalipukhuri located in the heart of the city was dug by King Bhagadatta of Kamarupa on the occasion of the wedding of his daughter Bhanumati with Duryodhana.

The 10th—12th century Kalika Purana mentions that Kamrup was inhabited by strong, cruel Kirata people.

=== Ancient history ===
Located within Guwahati is the Shakti temple of Goddess Kamakhya in Nilachal hill (an important seat of Tantric and Vajrayana Buddhism), the ancient and unique astrological temple Navagraha in Chitrachal Hill, and archaeological remains in Basistha and other archaeological locations of mythological importance.

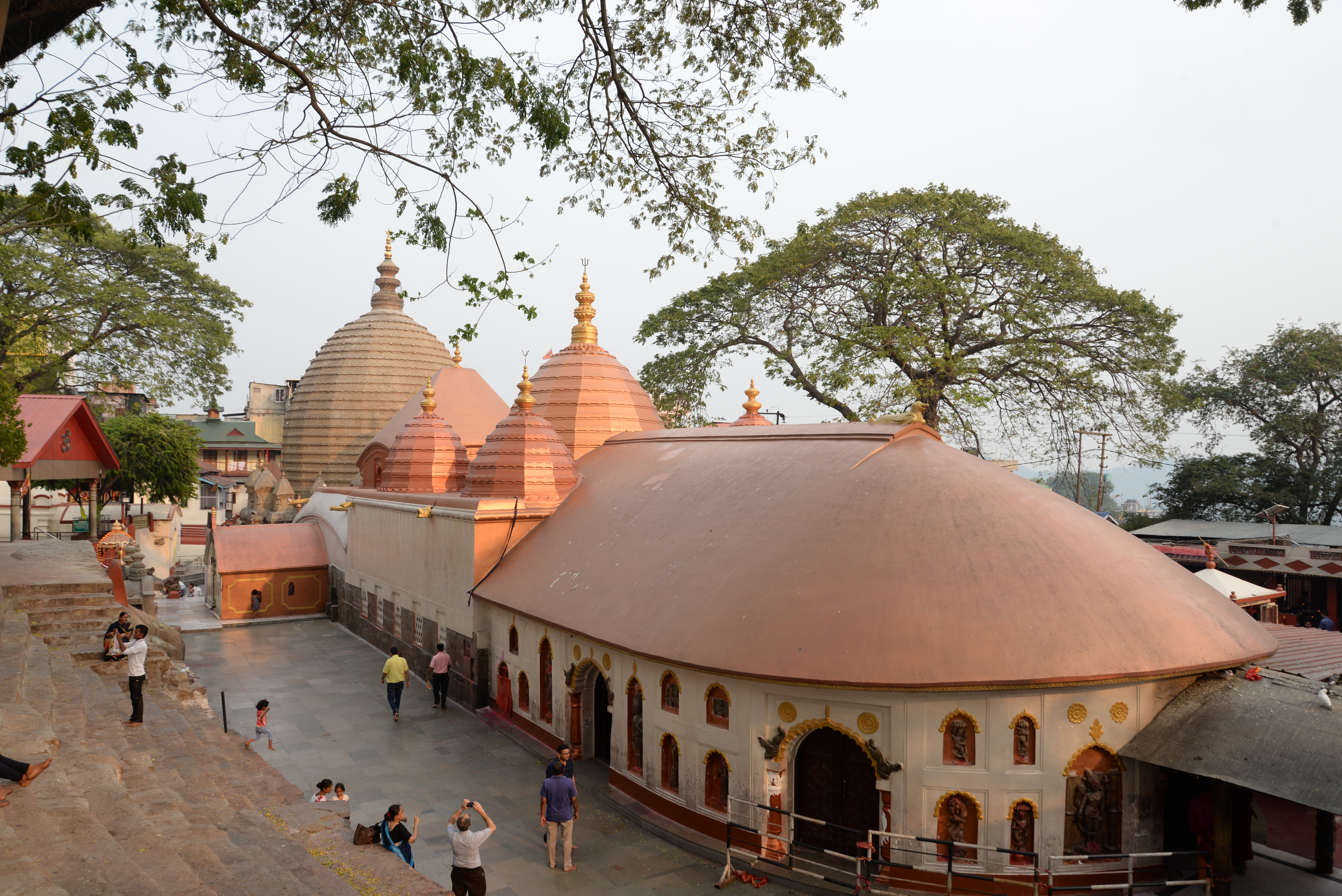
A view of Kamakhya Temple

The Ambari excavations trace the period of the city of Guwahati between the 2nd century BCE and the 1st century CE, in the Shunga-Kushana period of Indian history. Descriptions by Xuanzang (Hiuen Tsang) reveal that during the reign of the Varman king Bhaskaravarman (7th century CE), the city stretched for about 30 li (15 km or 9.3 mi). Archaeological evidence by excavations in Ambari, and excavated brick walls and houses discovered during construction of the present Cotton College's auditorium suggest the city was of economic and strategic importance until the 9th–11th century CE.

=== Medieval history ===
Koch King Parikshit had his capital at Pragjyotishpur near the Aswatirtha during the conflicts with Mughals. It came under Mughal occupation between (1633–59, 1662–69, 1679–81); their vestiges were completely removed after the Battle of Itakhuli.

Guwahati was the headquarters of the Borphukan, Ahom governor of Lower Assam till 1824.The Borphukan's residence was in the present Fancy Bazaar area and his council-hall, called Dopdar, was about 300 yards (270 m) to the west of the Bharalu stream.The Majindar Baruah, the personal secretary of the Borphukan, had his residence in the present-day deputy commissioner's residence. During the reign of the kingdom of Ahom, Guwahati was fortified strongly and connected with the country with a number of roads. The Dighalipukhuri was used as a boatyard during this period. During the time of splendor, since the reign of Gadadhar Singha, the Ahom rulers paid their attention to building several temples in various religious sites at Guwahati.

=== Colonial history ===
On the cession of Assam to the British in 1826, it was made the seat of the British administration of Assam, and so continued until 1874, when the headquarters were removed to Shillong in the Khasi hills.

=== Modern history ===
The Gauhati High Court (formerly known as the High Court of Assam) was promulgated on 1 March 1948 by the then Governor General of India, Lord Mountbatten, in accordance with the Government of India Act 1935. It became effective on 5 April 1948 and was initially established for the Province of Assam. R.F. Lodge was the inaugural Chief Justice of the Gauhati High Court, taking office on 5 April 1948.

The Saraighat Bridge, notable for its role in connecting Northeast India with the rest of the country, was constructed between 1959 and 1962 by the Hindustan Construction Company at a cost of approximately ₹ 106 million at the time. It was completed in September 1962, and the first engine crossed it on 23 September 1962.

In 1972, due to separation of Meghalaya from Assam, the capital of Assam was moved to Dispur, a neighbourhood in Guwahati from the erstwhile capital of Shillong.

== Geography ==
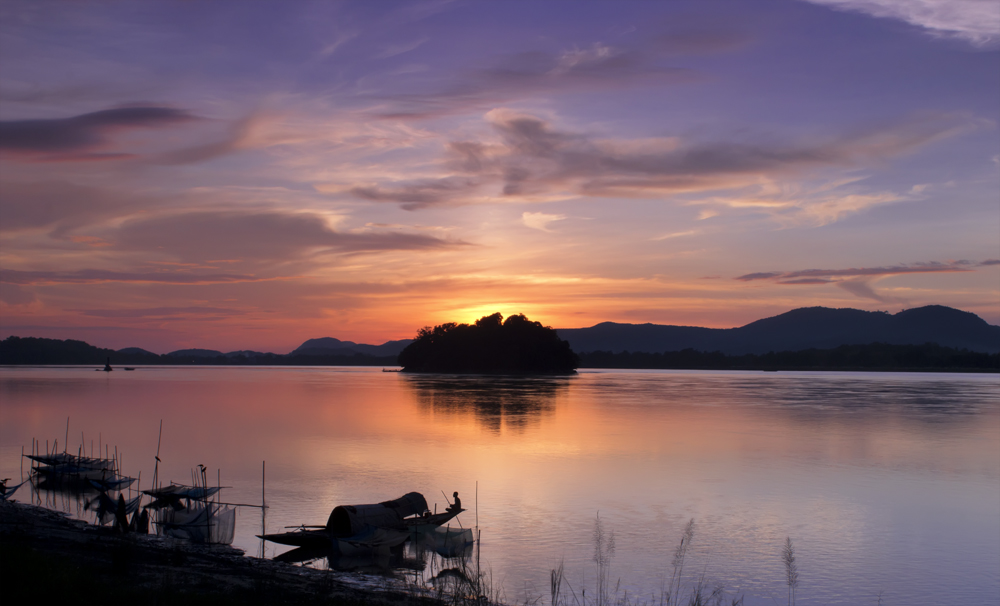
The smallest inhabited riverine island in the world, Peacock Island, on the Brahmaputra river

The Brahmaputra river flows to the north of the metropolis. The city is bordered on the south by the foothills of the Shillong plateau and to the east by the Amchang Wildlife Sanctuary. The Bharalu River, a tributary of the Brahmaputra, flows right through the heart of the city. To the south-west of the city lies Dipor Bil, a permanent freshwater lake with no prominent inflows apart from monsoon run-off from the hills to the south of the lake. The lake drains into the Brahmaputra, 5 km (3.1 mi) to the north, and acts as a natural stormwater reservoir for the city. There are also multiple hills within the city limits.

=== Urban morphology ===
Guwahati's urban morphology

Guwahati's 'urban form' radiates from a central core with growth corridors radiating and extending towards the south, east, and west. In the past few decades, southern Guwahati areas such as Ganeshguri, Beltola, Hatigaon, Six Mile, and Panjabari began forming a southern sub-center surrounding the capital complex at Dispur. The core area consists of the old city with Pan Bazaar, Paltan Bazaar, Fancy Bazaar and Uzan Bazaar, with each area facilitating unique urban activities.

Among the city corridors, the most important is the corridor formed along the Guwahati-Shillong (GS) Road towards the south (almost 15 km [9.3 mi] from the city-center). The GS Road corridor is an important commercial area with retail, wholesale and commercial offices developed along the main road; it is also a densely built residential area in the inner parts. The capital complex of Assam at Dispur is situated in this corridor. This corridor has facilitated the growth of a southern city sub-center at Ganeshguri, along with other residential areas to the south developed during the past few decades.

The corridor extending towards the west (around 30 km [19 mi] from the city center) contains a rail-road linking not only Guwahati but also other parts of the northeastern region east of Guwahati to western Assam and the rest of India. The corridor links residential and historically important areas such as Nilachal Hill (Kamakhya), Pandu, and Maligaon (headquarters of Northeast Frontier Railways) before it separates into two – one towards North Guwahati via the Saraighat Bridge and the other continuing west towards LGB International Airport via Gauhati University (Jalukbari). There are also many river ports/jetties along this corridor.

The third major corridor extends towards the east (around 15 km [9.3 mi] from the city-center) linking Noonmati (Guwahati Refinery) and Narengi, and has facilitated residential growth along with it. Highway NH-37, which encircles the city's southern parts and links the southern corridor in Noumile to the western corridor in Jalukbari is currently supporting rapid development. Similarly, the VIP Road linking Zoo Road with the eastern corridor and recently completed Hengerabari-Narengi Road are also supporting massive residential development to the east.

Guwahati is one among 98 Indian cities proposed to become Smart Cities under a project embarked on by Ministry of Urban Development, Government of India.

=== Climate ===
Guwahati

Climate chart (precipitation, max. and min. temperature)
| J | F | M | A | M | J | J | A | S | O | N | D |
| 12 24 11 | 18 27 13 | 53 31 17 | 182 31 20 | 253 32 23 | 314 33 25 | 283 33 26 | 264 33 26 | 185 33 25 | 118 31 22 | 9.6 29 17 | 4.6 25 13 |
- █ Average max. and min. temperatures in °C
- █ Precipitation totals in mm
Imperial conversion
| J | F | M | A | M | J | J | A | S | O | N | D |
| 0.5 75 51 | 0.7 81 55 | 2.1 87 62 | 7.2 88 69 | 10 89 73 | 12 91 77 | 11 91 79 | 10 92 78 | 7.3 91 77 | 4.6 88 72 | 0.4 83 63 | 0.2 78 55 |
- █ Average max. and min. temperatures in °F
- █ Precipitation totals in inches

Guwahati has a humid subtropical climate (Köppen climate classification Cwa), falling just short of a tropical savanna climate (Köppen climate classification Aw).

Highest recorded temperature: 40.6 °C (105.1 °F) on 24 April 2014

Lowest recorded temperature: 3.0 °C (37.4 °F) on 30 January 1964

Climate data for Guwahati (Lokpriya Gopinath Bordoloi International Airport) (1991–2020, extremes 1951–present)
| Month | Jan | Feb | Mar | Apr | May | Jun | Jul | Aug | Sep | Oct | Nov | Dec | Year |
|---|---|---|---|---|---|---|---|---|---|---|---|---|---|
| Record high °C (°F) | 29.8 (85.6) | 35.7 (96.3) | 38.6 (101.5) | 40.6 (105.1) | 40.3 (104.5) | 39.0 (102.2) | 38.4 (101.1) | 39.2 (102.6) | 38.0 (100.4) | 37.0 (98.6) | 33.4 (92.1) | 30.9 (87.6) | 40.6 (105.1) |
| Mean daily maximum °C (°F) | 23.9 (75.0) | 27.0 (80.6) | 30.5 (86.9) | 31.2 (88.2) | 31.8 (89.2) | 32.6 (90.7) | 32.8 (91.0) | 33.2 (91.8) | 32.5 (90.5) | 31.3 (88.3) | 28.5 (83.3) | 25.4 (77.7) | 30.0 (86.0) |
| Daily mean °C (°F) | 17.4 (63.3) | 20.0 (68.0) | 23.5 (74.3) | 25.7 (78.3) | 27.3 (81.1) | 28.7 (83.7) | 29.3 (84.7) | 29.5 (85.1) | 28.6 (83.5) | 26.7 (80.1) | 22.8 (73.0) | 19.0 (66.2) | 24.9 (76.8) |
| Mean daily minimum °C (°F) | 10.8 (51.4) | 13.0 (55.4) | 16.5 (61.7) | 20.3 (68.5) | 22.9 (73.2) | 25.2 (77.4) | 25.9 (78.6) | 25.8 (78.4) | 24.9 (76.8) | 22.3 (72.1) | 17.2 (63.0) | 12.6 (54.7) | 19.7 (67.5) |
| Record low °C (°F) | 3.0 (37.4) | 5.3 (41.5) | 8.5 (47.3) | 10.3 (50.5) | 16.4 (61.5) | 20.4 (68.7) | 20.6 (69.1) | 20.8 (69.4) | 19.9 (67.8) | 13.8 (56.8) | 10.0 (50.0) | 4.9 (40.8) | 3.0 (37.4) |
| Average rainfall mm (inches) | 11.5 (0.45) | 18.0 (0.71) | 52.5 (2.07) | 182.1 (7.17) | 253.0 (9.96) | 314.0 (12.36) | 283.4 (11.16) | 264.3 (10.41) | 184.5 (7.26) | 117.9 (4.64) | 9.6 (0.38) | 4.6 (0.18) | 1,695.3 (66.74) |
| Average precipitation days (≥ 0.3 mm) | 2.1 | 3.2 | 5.7 | 15.2 | 18.7 | 20 | 21.2 | 18.2 | 14.4 | 7.4 | 1.8 | 1.2 | 129.1 |
| Average rainy days | 1.1 | 1.9 | 4.4 | 10.6 | 14.2 | 14.6 | 15.2 | 12.3 | 9.7 | 4.8 | 0.7 | 0.5 | 90.0 |
| Average relative humidity (%) | 72 | 59 | 51 | 62 | 71 | 78 | 80 | 81 | 82 | 79 | 77 | 76 | 72 |
| Mean monthly sunshine hours | 225.5 | 213.8 | 220.1 | 200.6 | 191.1 | 133.1 | 123.7 | 161.6 | 139.0 | 205.8 | 230.9 | 231.7 | 2,276.9 |
Source 1: India Meteorological Department (1991-2020)
Source 2: NOAA (sun 1971–1990, precipitation days) Tokyo Climate Center (mean temperatures 1991–2020)

Guwahati has been ranked 36th best "National Clean Air City" under (Category 2 3-10L Population cities) in India.

== Infrastructure ==
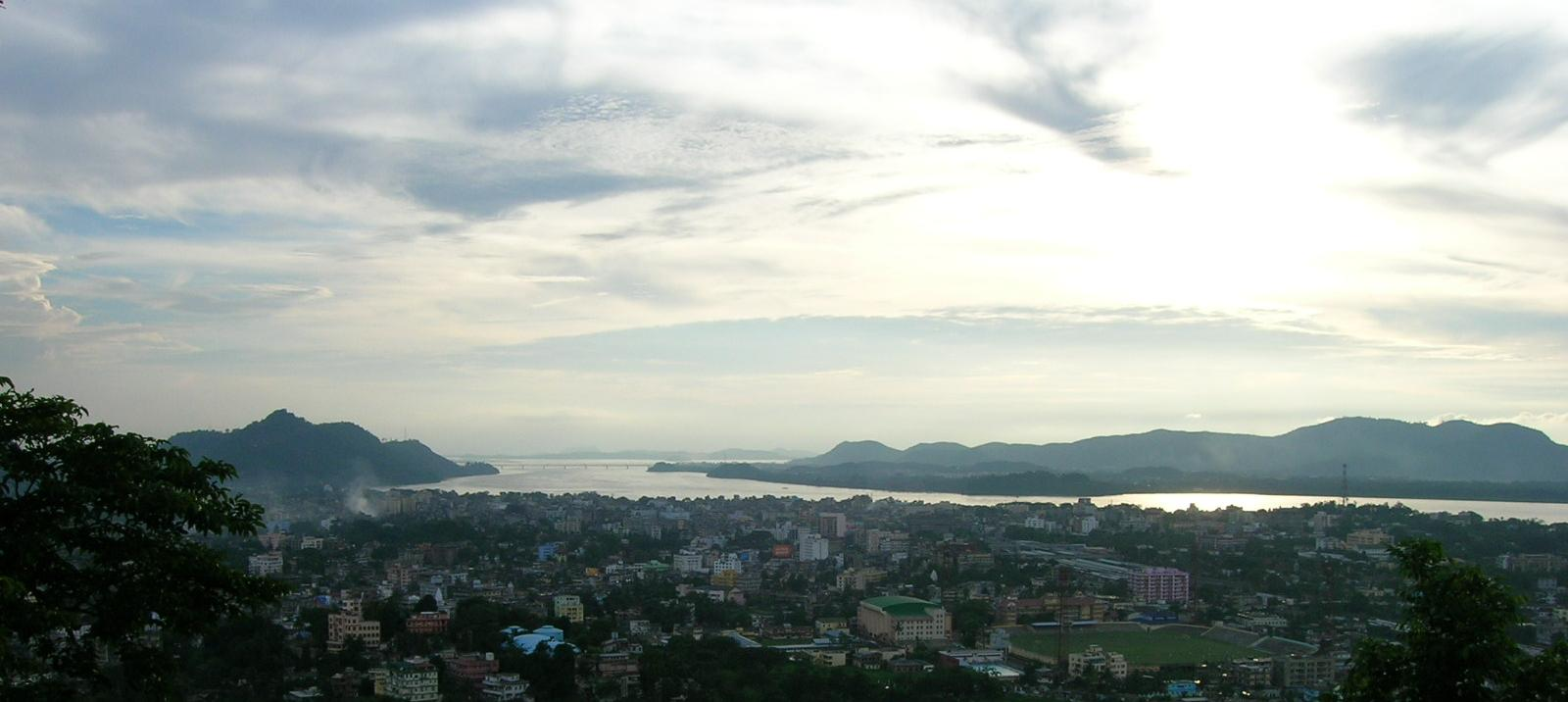
City view from Sarania Hill

Based on a 2006 survey, Guwahati was found to be the 17th best place to live for large and medium-size cities in India. The city serves as an urban region, with well-developed social infrastructure as well as housing. Moreover, Guwahati is linked to the East-West corridor which receives central government funding.

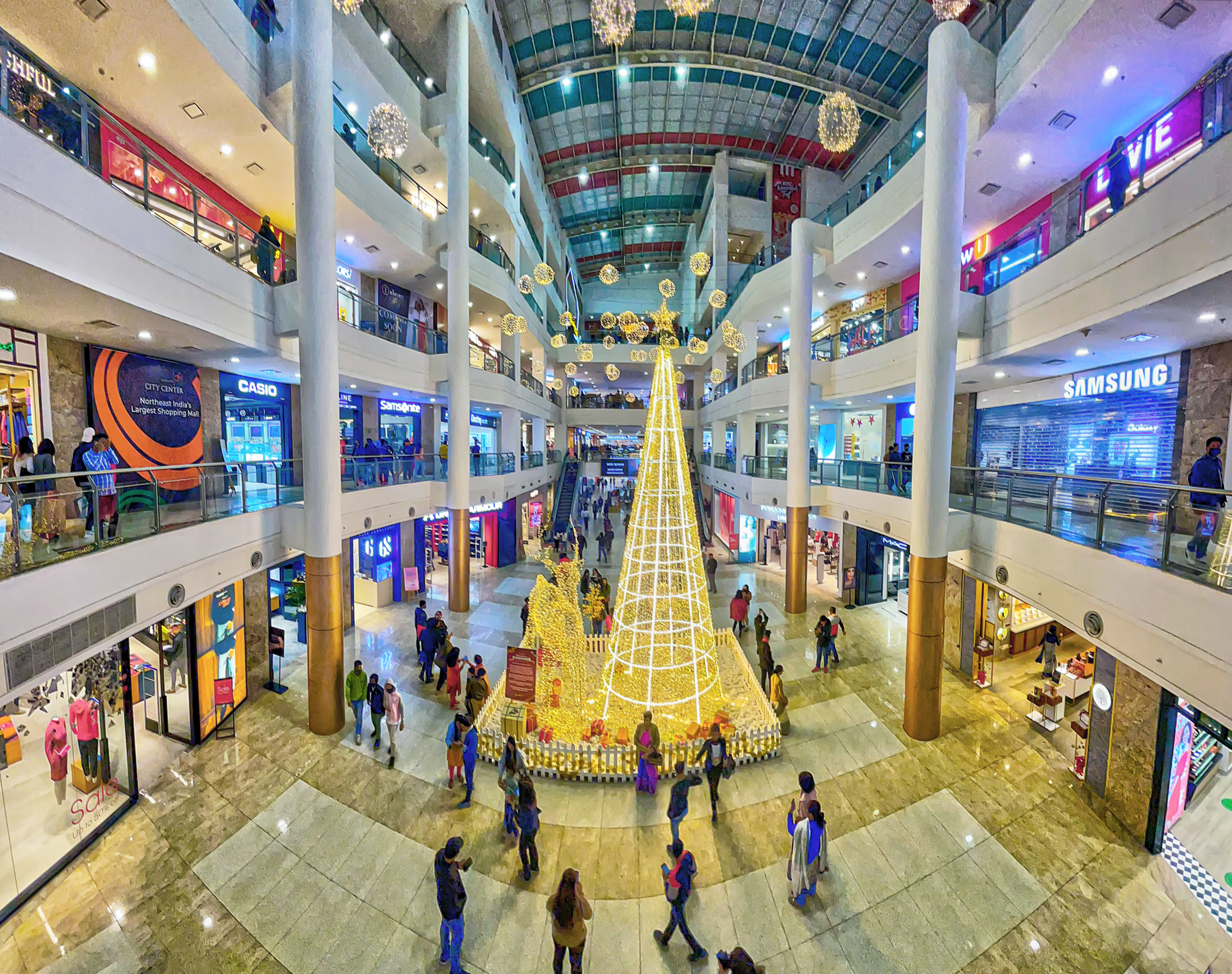
City Center Mall, GS Road, Guwahati

The city still needs attention to improve its infrastructure. Funding from the Asian Development Bank is providing assistance to improve Guwahati's transportation infrastructure along with a substantial amount from Jawaharlal Nehru National Urban Renewal Mission (JNNURM) for its development.

== Administration and governance ==
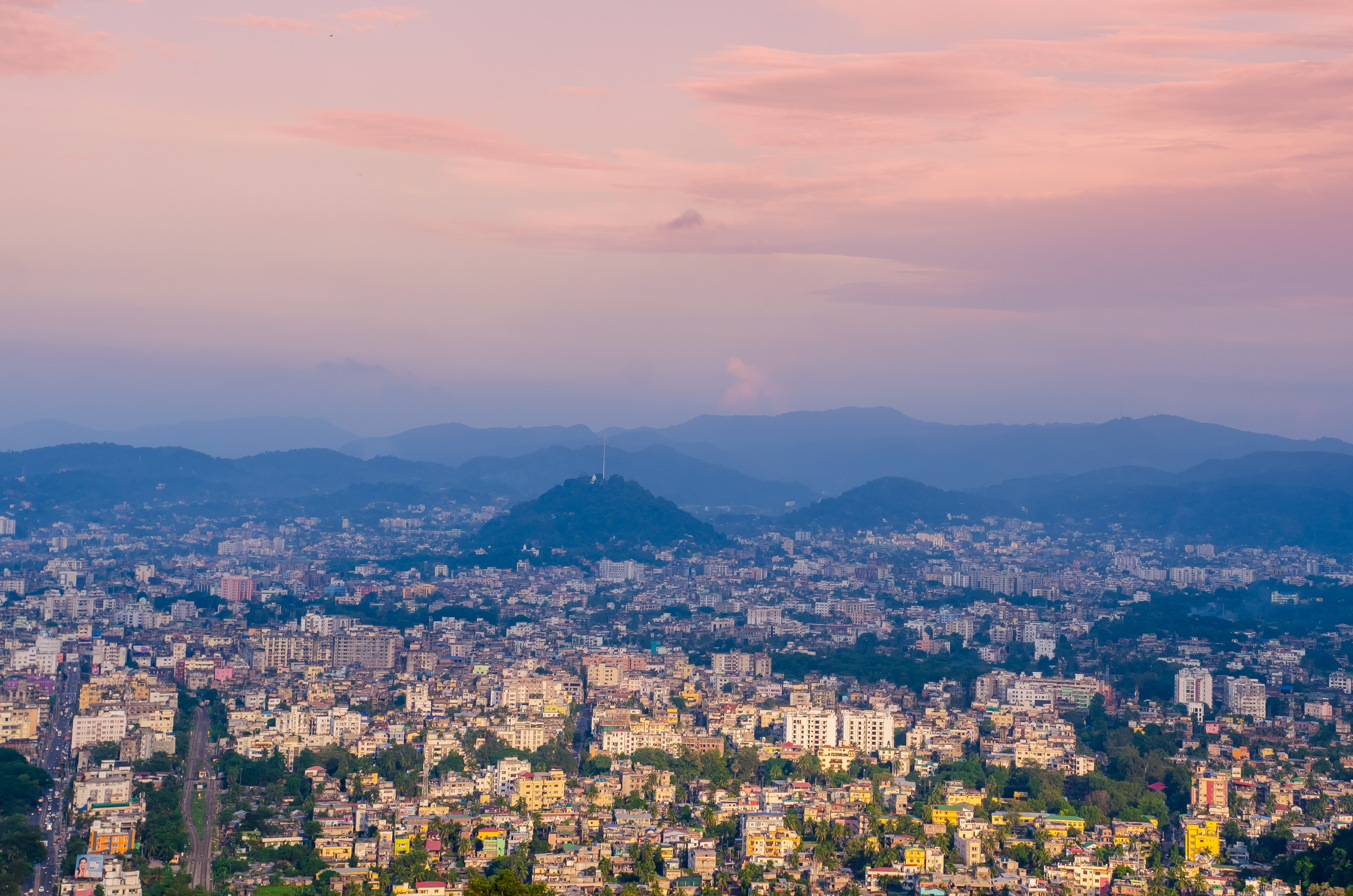
Guwahati city

Dispur, the capital of Assam, lies in Guwahati. The passing of the Northeastern (Reorganization Areas) Act in 1971 by the Indian Parliament accorded Meghalaya the status of a full-fledged state. After the creation of Meghalaya as a separate state, Shillong continued to be the joint capital of both Assam and Meghalaya. However, in 1972, the Government of Assam decided to shift the capital to Dispur. Accordingly, the first sitting of the Budget Session of the Assam Legislative Assembly was held at Dispur on 16 March 1973. Dispur houses the Secretariat of Assam Government, the Assam Assembly House, the National Bank for Agriculture and Rural Development (NABARD) Regional Office, the North Eastern Development Finance Corporation Ltd (NEDFi) House and the Guwahati Tea Auction Centre (GTAC).

Guwahati Municipal Corporation is the local body responsible for governing, developing and managing the city. It is divided into 60 municipal wards. Guwahati Metropolitan Development Authority (GMDA) is an agency responsible for planning and development of the greater Guwahati Metropolitan Area and for revising the Guwahati Master Plan and Building Bylaws to cover an area of 3,214 square kilometres (1,241 sq mi) by 2025.

Guwahati consists of four assembly constituencies: Jalukbari, Dispur, Gauhati East and Gauhati West, all of which are part of the constituency of Lok Sabha,Gauhati.

According to financial data published on the CityFinance Portal of the Ministry of Housing and Urban Affairs, the Guwahati Municipal Corporation reported total revenue receipts of ₹272 crore (US$33 million) and total expenditure of ₹237 crore (US$28 million) in 2022–23. Tax revenue accounted for about 42.6% of the total revenue, while the corporation received ₹88 crore in grants during the financial year.

=== Police ===
Guwahati is the headquarters of Assam Police.

The city is under the Police Commissionerate of Guwahati headed by the Commissioner of Police, Guwahati. It is divided into three districts: East Police District, Central Police District, and West Police District, each headed by a Deputy Commissioner of Police. Each police district consists of officers, not below the rank of Assistant Commissioner of Police, functioning as executive magistrates within a said metropolitan area.

=== Judiciary ===
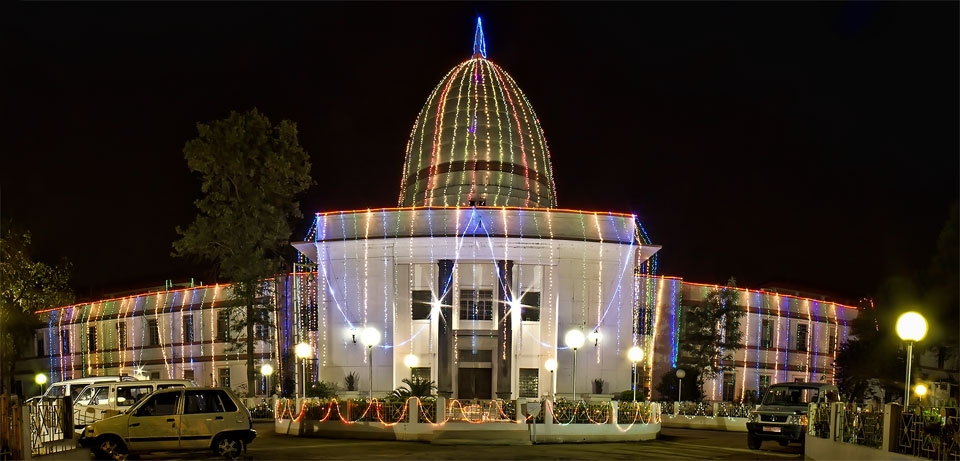
The Gauhati High Court

Guwahati is the principal seat of the Gauhati High Court. It acts as the High Court of Assam and also of Nagaland, Mizoram and Arunachal Pradesh with their outlying benches of Kohima, Aizawl and Itanagar, respectively. Gauhati High Court came in effect from 5 April 1948. It initially had its sittings at Shillong but was shifted to Gauhati from 14 August 1948.

Guwahati also houses the Court of the District and Sessions Judge, Kamrup established in 1920. It is a lower court of the district judiciary having territorial jurisdiction over the greater Guwahati area only.

=== Problems ===
==== Increase in population ====
In recent years, Guwahati has experienced rapid population growth due to migration for education and employment opportunities. This population increase has led to undesirable expansion of the city and has resulted in various collateral problems, such as the rise in the number of slums. It is projected that the population of Guwahati will reach 1.5 million by 2035, up from an estimated 1.1 million in 2020.

==== Inflation ====
One of the economic problems that the citizens of Guwahati have to put up with is the hike in prices of many essentials, chiefly vegetables, poultry, and fish. The prices of these commodities keep escalating at an inordinate rate, so that consumers find it difficult to buy these items. Vegetables are transported into Assam from West Bengal, Bihar, Uttar Pradesh, Delhi, Maharashtra and Meghalaya and the truckers en route have to pay substantial fees as tax at various check posts. It is one of the causes of rise in prices of vegetables in the markets of Guwahati. The prices of locally available vegetables and fruits undergo large markup because of transportation expenses grounds, besides intra-State check posts taxes.

The price of poultry, mainly chicken, that reaches the city markets from places like Chaygaon and Barpeta have been soaring rapidly because of similar factors. There has been steep rise in the price of fish as well, the prominent varieties of which being Rohu ("Rou"), Catla ("Bahu"), Walking catfish ("Magur") and Monopterus ("Kuchia") among many others.

The COVID-19 pandemic further exacerbated inflation, causing food prices to rise.

==== Flooding ====
According to experts, urban flooding in Guwahati in the near future is expected to worsen to the point where residents of certain areas may be forced to relocate. Since the beginning of the 21st century, the alteration of drainage channels and wetlands due to rapid urbanization has exacerbated the problem of flooding.

Professor Abani Kumar Bhagawati of Gauhati University stated that since before there were sufficient wetlands to absorb rainwater and channels to carry excess water to the Brahmaputra, the city did not experience floods. However, human interference has disrupted the natural topography, leading to the current situation where "just half an hour of rain" can cause flooding in the city. Encroachment and concretization, which reduce open areas for natural water absorption, are the primary causes of floods according to Bhagawati.

==== Pollution ====
Guwahati was ranked the second most polluted city in the world in a 2023 report published by IQAir, behind Begusarai and ahead of Delhi, reflecting India's status as the country with the third highest level of pollution after Bangladesh and Pakistan.

== Demographics ==
Historical Guwahati city population
| Year | Pop. | ±% |
|---|---|---|
| 1951 | 45,000 | — |
| 1961 | 138,000 | +206.7% |
| 1971 | 203,000 | +47.1% |
| 1981 | 348,000 | +71.4% |
| 1991 | 591,000 | +69.8% |
| 2001 | 818,809 | +38.5% |
| 2011 | 962,334 | +17.5% |
| 2021 | 1,135,000 | +17.9% |
Source: Guwahati city historical demography

Religions in Guwahati (2011)
| Religion | Percent |
| Hinduism | 84.74% |
| Islam | 12.45% |
| Jainism | 0.96% |
| Christianity | 0.93% |
| Other or not stated | 0.92% |

=== Population ===
Guwahati is one of the fastest-growing cities in India. Guwahati has a population of 962,334 as per the 2011 census. Population of Guwahati in 2021 is estimated to be 11 lakhs (approx). It is estimated that Guwahati metro will house 2.8 million residents by 2025.

=== Literacy and sex ratio ===
The percentage of the child population (0-14) in Guwahati was 9.40% in 2011. The average literacy rate was stated to be 91.47% with male literacy at 94.24% and female literacy at 88.50%. The sex ratio was recorded to be 933 females per 1,000 males and child sex ratio to be 940 girls per 1,000 boys.

=== Languages ===
Languages spoken in Guwahati (2011)
1. Assamese (57.8%)
2. Bengali (20.4%)
3. Hindi (12.3%)
4. Nepali (1.92%)
5. Boro (1.69%)
6. Manipuri (0.91%)
7. Bhojpuri (0.90%)
8. Others (4.09%)

According to the 2011 census, there were around 962,334 people living in Guwahati city, of which around 57.80% spoke Assamese, 20.40% Bengali, 12.29% Hindi, 1.92% Nepali, 1.69% Boro, 0.91% Manipuri and 0.90% Bhojpuri as their first language.

== Education ==
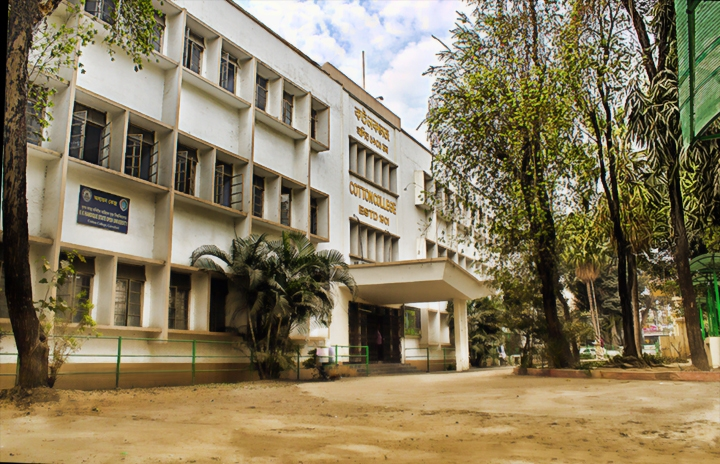
Cotton University

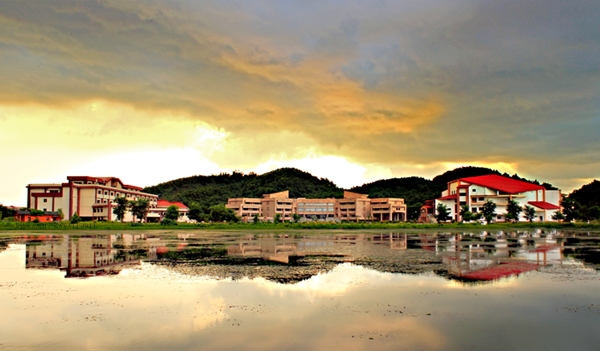
IIT Guwahati

Guwahati is the central educational hub of Northeast India. Among the esteemed institutions is the Indian Institute of Technology Guwahati (IIT), an autonomous institute dedicated in the field of technical studies in India. Cotton University, erstwhile Cotton College is yet another century-old institution in the fields of Science and Arts.

=== Educational institutions ===
{This is not a complete list of all institutes; only a few are mentioned.}

- Indian Institute of Technology, Guwahati
- Indian Institute of Information Technology, Guwahati
- All India Institute of Medical Sciences, Guwahati
- National Institute of Pharmaceutical Education and Research, Guwahati
- Institute of Advanced Study in Science and Technology, Guwahati
- Central Institute of Petrochemicals Engineering and Technology, Guwahati
- Srimanta Sankaradeva University of Health Sciences
- Assam Science and Technology University
- Gauhati Medical College and Hospital
- ESIC Medical College & Hospital, Beltola, Guwahati
- Pragjyotishpur Medical College & Hospital
- Government Ayurvedic College, Guwahati
- Assam Engineering College
- Gauhati University
- Cotton University
- Indian Institute of Management Guwahati
- National Law University and Judicial Academy
- Tata Institute of Social Sciences, Guwahati
- Regional Dental College, Guwahati
- Assam Institute of Management
- Assam Don Bosco University
- Royal Global University
- Assam Down Town University
- Girijananda Chowdhury University
- Pragjyotishpur university
- Dispur College
- B. Borooah College
- Gauhati Commerce College
- Handique Girls College
- Krishna Kanta Handiqui State Open University
- Scholars Institute of Technology and Management (SITM)
- S. B. Deorah College
- Dakshin Kamrup College
- Dakshin Kamrup Girls' College
- Arya Vidyapeeth College (Autonomous)
- K.C. Das Commerce College
- Lakshmibai National Institute of Physical Education
- NERIM Group of Institutions
- NEF Law College / NEF College

==== Private schools ====
{This is not a complete list of all Schools; only a few are mentioned.}

- NPS International School
- Spring Dale International School
- Vandya International School
- International School Guwahati
- Cambridge International School
- The Green School International
- ADHYAYAN INTERNATIONAL SCHOOL
- Finland International School
- The Hidayah International School
- Skies And Beyond International School
- Don Bosco School
- The down town School
- Miles Bronson Residential School
- Delhi Public School
- Sanskriti the Gurukul
- Holy Child School

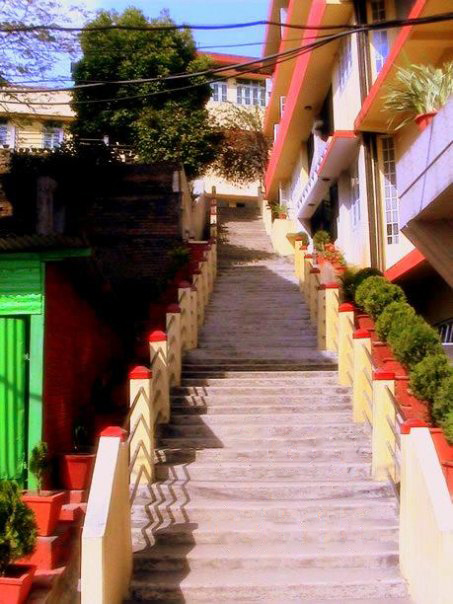
Holy Child School Guwahati

- St. Mary's English High School

== Economy ==
Pandu, located on the banks of the Brahmaputra at the western part of the city, is an ancient urban area that acted as the chief military base for the Ahoms against external invasions. Due to extensive fortification ('Gorh') surrounding Pandu, it acts as a natural river harbor and is formally called Gar-Pandu. Pandu port falls under Dhubri-Sadiya National Waterway-2 and is an important terminal and transit point for goods and cargo as well as passenger and tourist vessels. Construction of both low-level and high-level jetty of fixed terminal, capable of handling container vessels, has been completed and has further enhanced revenue generation for the city.

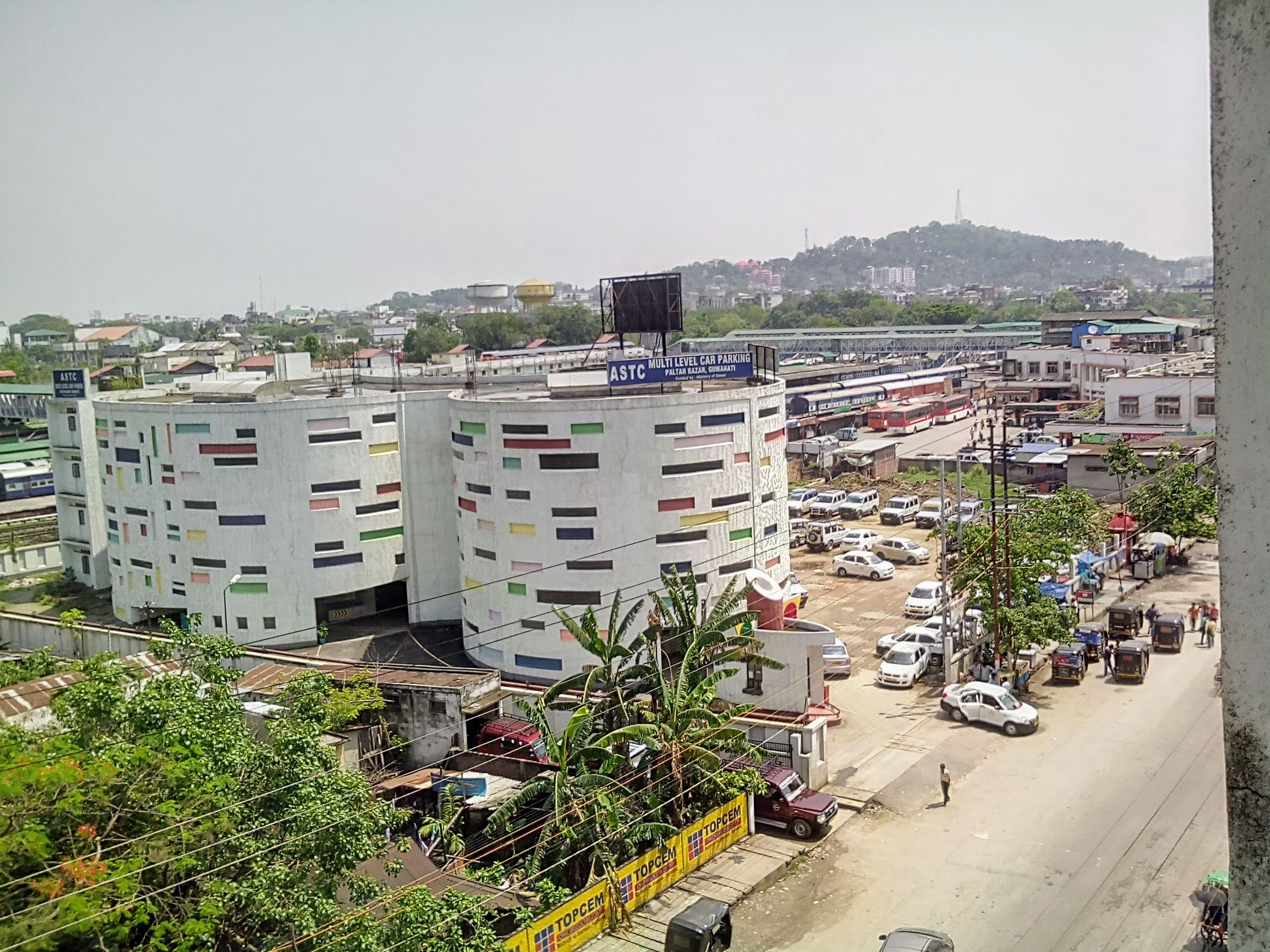
Multi Level Car Parking Facility operated by Assam State Transport Corporation (ASTC) situated at Paltanbazar, Guwahati

The manufacturing sector in Guwahati contributes a substantial share to the economy of the city. Petroleum manufacturing is an important economic activity in the city. The Guwahati Refinery is the most important manufacturing industry in the city. Located at Noonmati, the refinery was set up by the Indian Oil Corporation Limited as the first public sector refinery of India as well as the refinery of Indian Oil since 1962. It was built with an initial crude processing capacity of 0.75 million tonnes per year at the time of its commission which was gradually increased to 1.0 million tonnes per year. It produces various products and supplies them to the other northeast states and also beyond to Siliguri through the Guwahati-Siliguri pipeline. The various products produced by the refinery include Liquefied Petroleum Gas (LPG), Kerosene Oil, Turbine Fuel (aviation use), Motor Spirit, High-Speed Motor Diesel, Light Diesel Oil, and Raw Petroleum Coke. There is also an LPG bottling plant in the city.

Tea manufacturing and processing is another important activity of Guwahati. Assam is one of the highest tea-producing areas in the world, contributing 80% of India's export and 55% of the country's total tea production. So high is the production of tea in Assam that it is the biggest industry in the state. The headquarters of the Assam Branch Indian Tea Association (ABITA) is located at Guwahati. The Guwahati Tea Auction Centre (GTAC), located adjacent to the capital complex at Dispur, is the world's largest CTC tea auction center and the second largest in terms of total tea auctioned. The inaugural sale took place on 25 September 1970 and the first lot of tea was auctioned at the price of ₹ 42.50 which, during those days, was a significant achievement. In the month of August 2019, a kilogram of Maijan Orthodox Golden tea sold for a record-setting price of ₹ 70,501 at the Guwahati Tea Auction Centre.

Many centralised, private and international banks have set up their branches in the city with the Reserve Bank of India having one of its own at Pan Bazaar.

== Transport ==
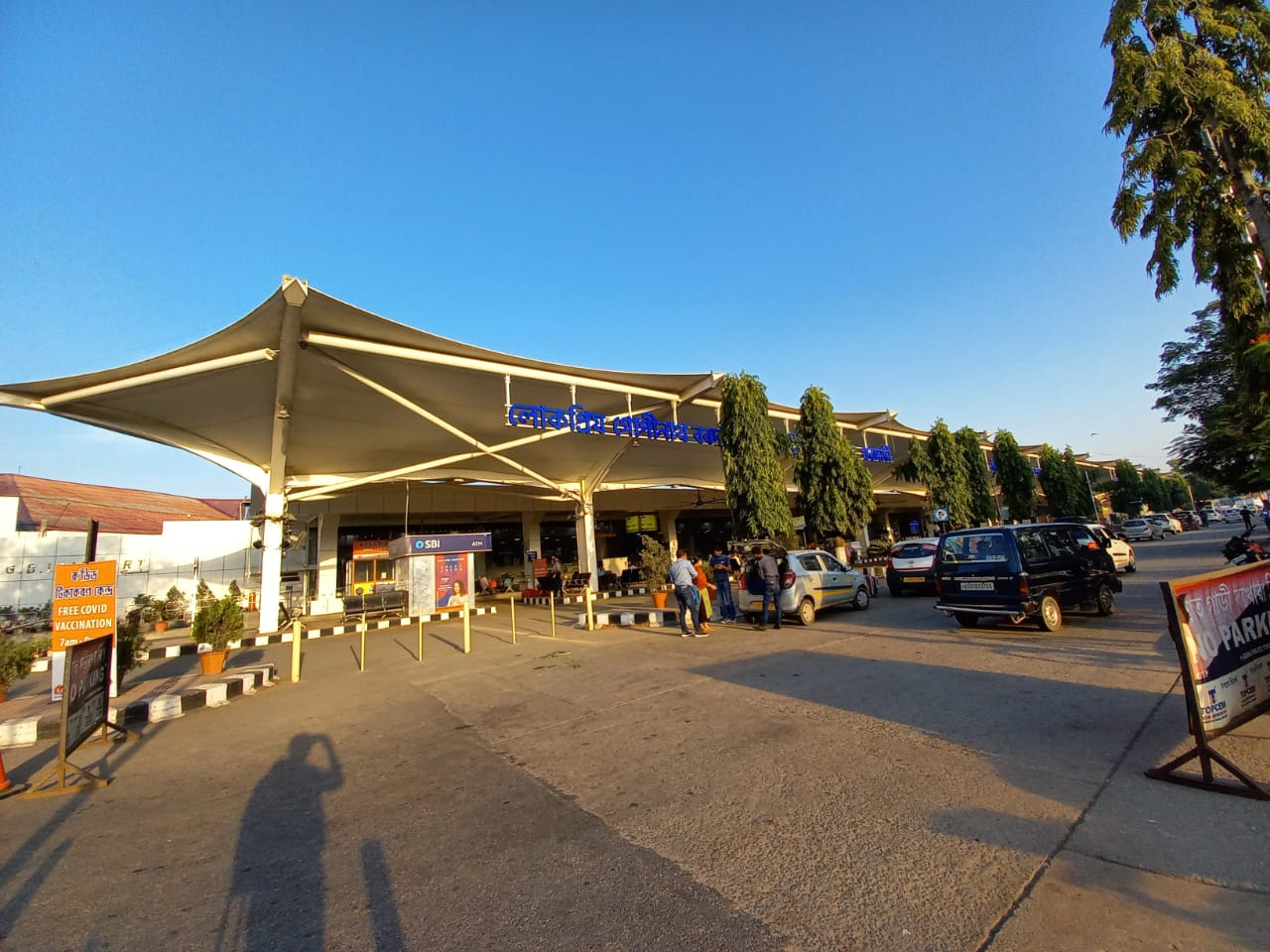
Lokpriya Gopinath Bordoloi International Airport

=== Air ===
Guwahati is served by the Lokpriya Gopinath Bordoloi International Airport, in Borjhar, about 20 kilometres (12 mi) west from the heart of the city. Both T1 and newly constructed Architectural Award winning T2

=== Rail ===
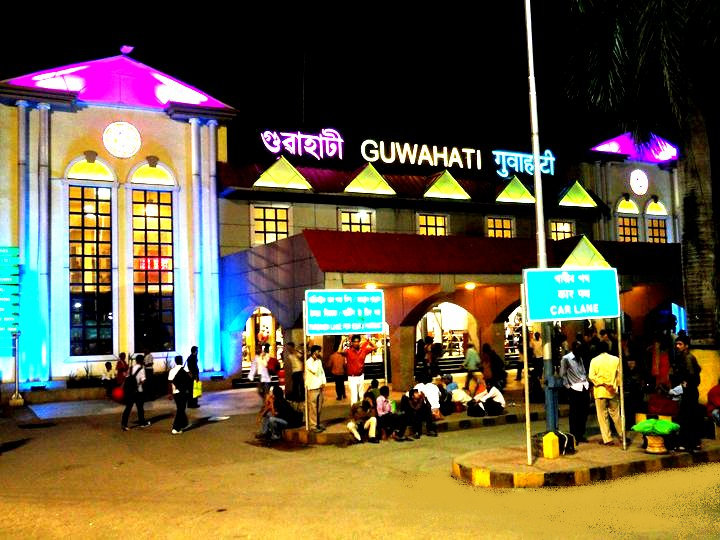
Guwahati Railway Station

The city of Guwahati and the northeastern region falls under the Northeast Frontier Railway (NFR) Zone of the Indian Railways, the headquarters of which is in Maligaon, near Nilachal Hills, in the northwest of the city. The Guwahati railway station, located in Paltan Bazaar area of Guwahati, is the busiest railway station in the city. It lies along the Barauni-Guwahati Line and Guwahati–Lumding section, categorised as an A-1 railway station under Lumding railway division.

There are four more railway stations in the city – the Kamakhya Junction for passenger and freight services, the New Guwahati railway station (near Noonmati) for only freight services, Narangi railway station and Azara railway station. There are regular trains connecting Guwahati to and from other major cities of the country. Rajdhani Express, Poorvottar Sampark Kranti Express, Brahmaputra Mail, Kamrup Express, Northeast Express, Saraighat Express and Vande Bharat are some significant trains running to and from Guwahati. The train with the longest route in India, Vivek Express, which runs from Dibrugarh in Upper Assam to Kanyakumari in the southern tip of India passes through Guwahati.

=== Road ===
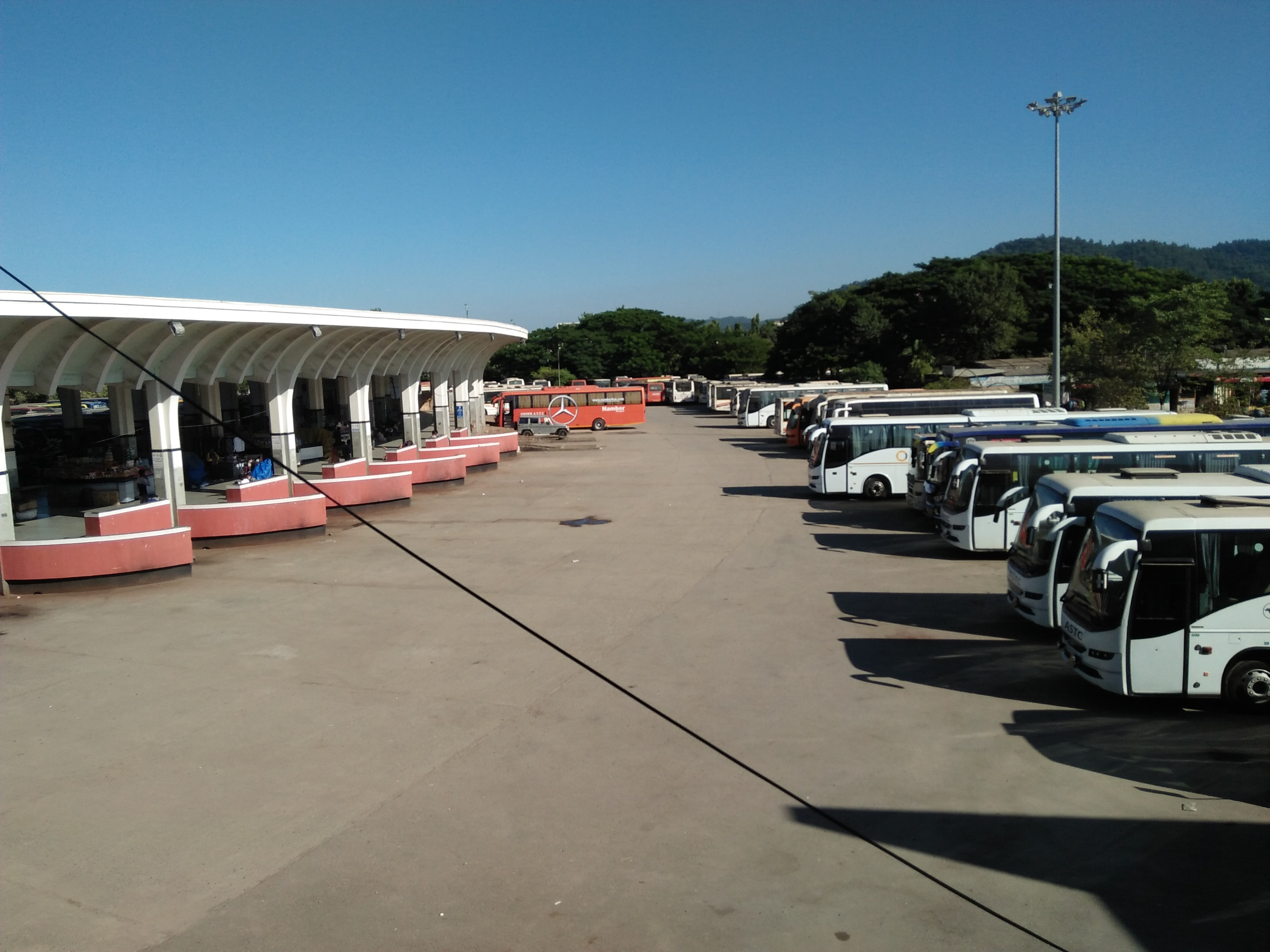
Buses standing at Rupnath Brahma Inter-State Bus Terminal (ISBT), Guwahati

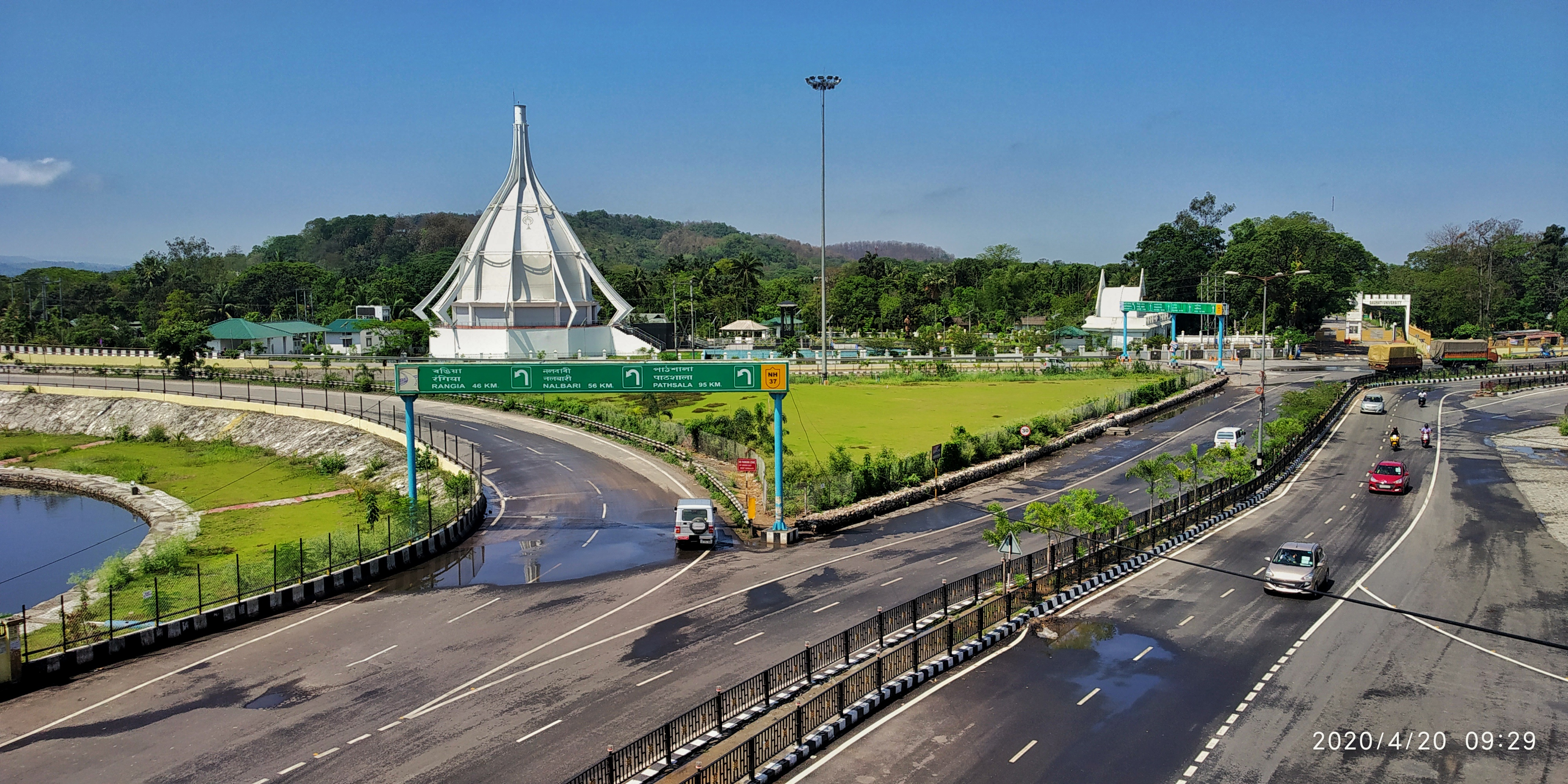
Roads in Jalukbari, Guwahati

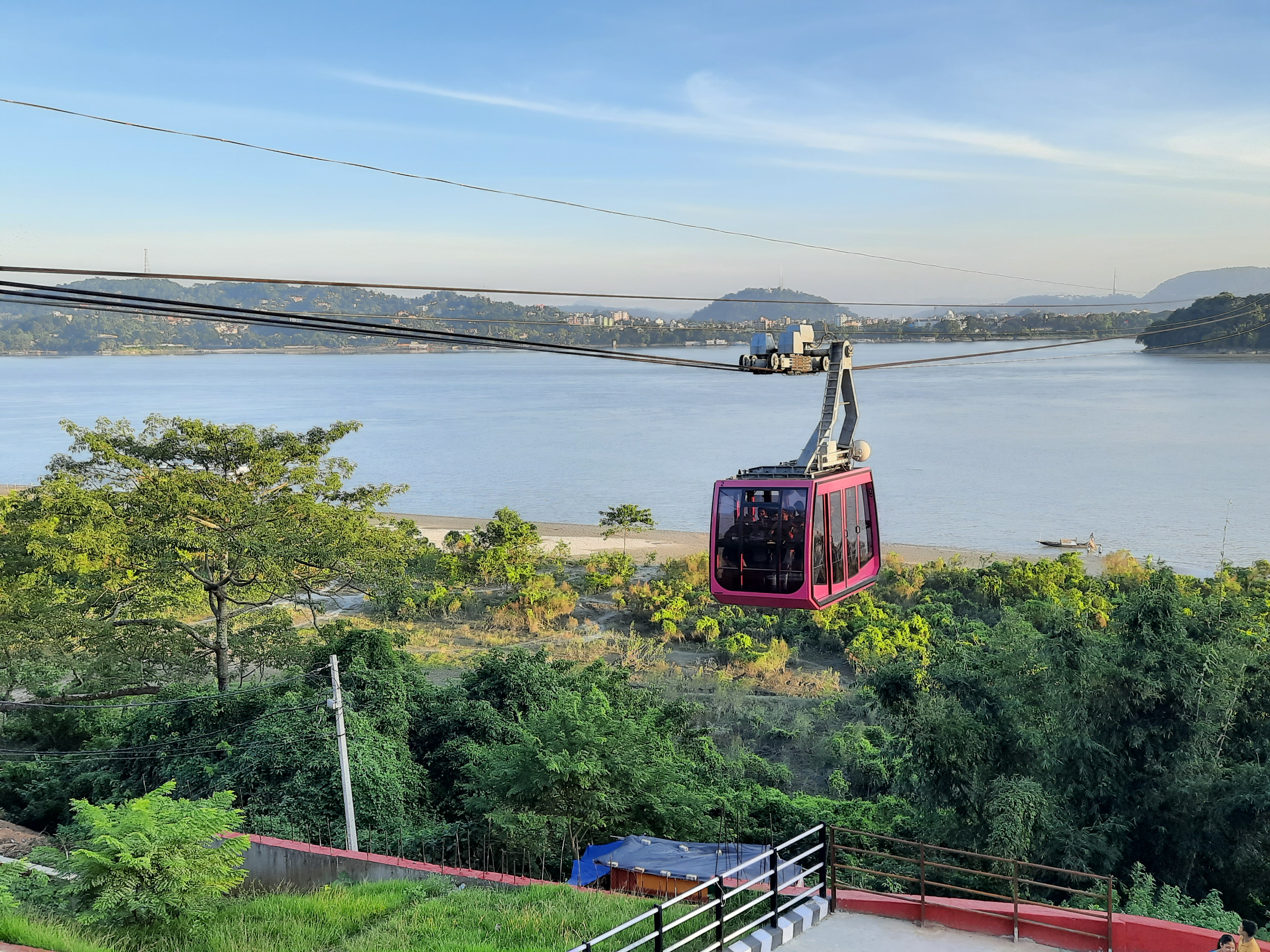
Guwahati Ropeway

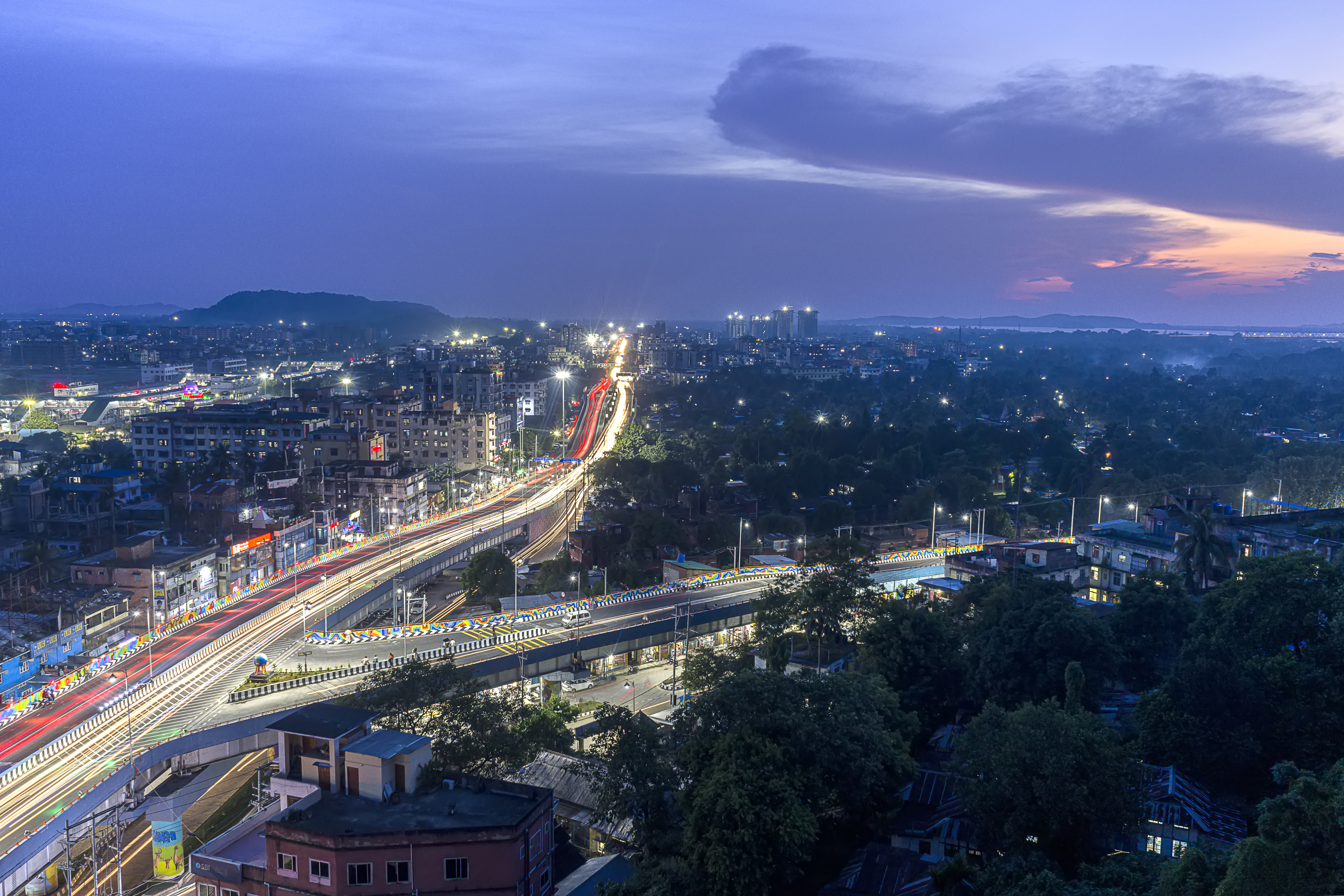
Nilachal Flyover, located in the Maligaon area of Guwahati is one of the longest flyover of Assam

The length of surfaced roads within the city is 218 km (135 mi). National Highway 27 connects Guwahati with the states West Bengal, Bihar and rest of India. This highway connects Guwahati with Silchar in Barak Valley Assam and further connecting the city to the states of Meghalaya, Manipur, Mizoram and Tripura. National Highway 17 from Sevoke in West Bengal terminates in Jalukbari and connects Guwahati with the major cities of Dhubri and Cooch Behar. National Highway 15 and its several secondary roads runs through both the banks of River Brahmaputra and connects the Guwahati with the cities of Tezpur, Jorhat, Dibrugarh in Upper Assam and the states of Arunachal Pradesh and Nagaland.

Public transportation is well developed in the city. Buses are the major means of public transport in Guwahati. The state-owned Assam State Urban Transport Corporation, a subsidiary of Assam State Transport Corporation (ASTC) and private operators provide the city bus services within the city. ASTC also operates the Volvo air-conditioned bus services within the city as well as to the LGBI airport. The Rupnath Brahma Inter State Bus Terminus (ISBT), located at Betkuchi on NH-37, is the most significant terminal cum transit point with regular day and night bus services from state owned ASTC and private operators plying between Guwahati and other destinations in Assam and Northeast India. The areas of Adabari and Paltan Bazaar also act as nodal points in providing bus services to towns and cities in Assam and adjoining states.

Guwahati-Panchgram Expressway, the first expressway of Northeast India is a greenfield expressway from Guwahati to Umiam Lake (Barapani) in Meghalaya and then direct to old paper mill in Panchgram, which will cut the Guwahati to Punchgram by 5 hours. It was announced in February 2025.

=== Metro ===
A metro rail project has also been planned to relieve the hectic traffic conditions on the streets. Although it is being cited that the metropolis is yet not feasible for a metro project.

=== Active Transport ===
Guwahati has also seen a rise in the usage of cycling as a mode of transport and as per some unofficial estimates, there was almost a 50% increase in the number of people who took up cycling in the wake of COVID-19. The city has an active cycling community and is amongst the few Indian cities that has a Bicycle Mayor and a Junior Bicycle Mayor.

=== Water ===
The Inland Water Transport Department is headquartered at Pandu Port in Guwahati, the largest river port in Assam. The waterways transportation services in Guwahati are used for transporting bulk goods and cargo, and for movement of passenger and tourist vessels. Ferry services are available for transportation of people from different ports along the Brahmaputra to Pandu port.

== Sports ==
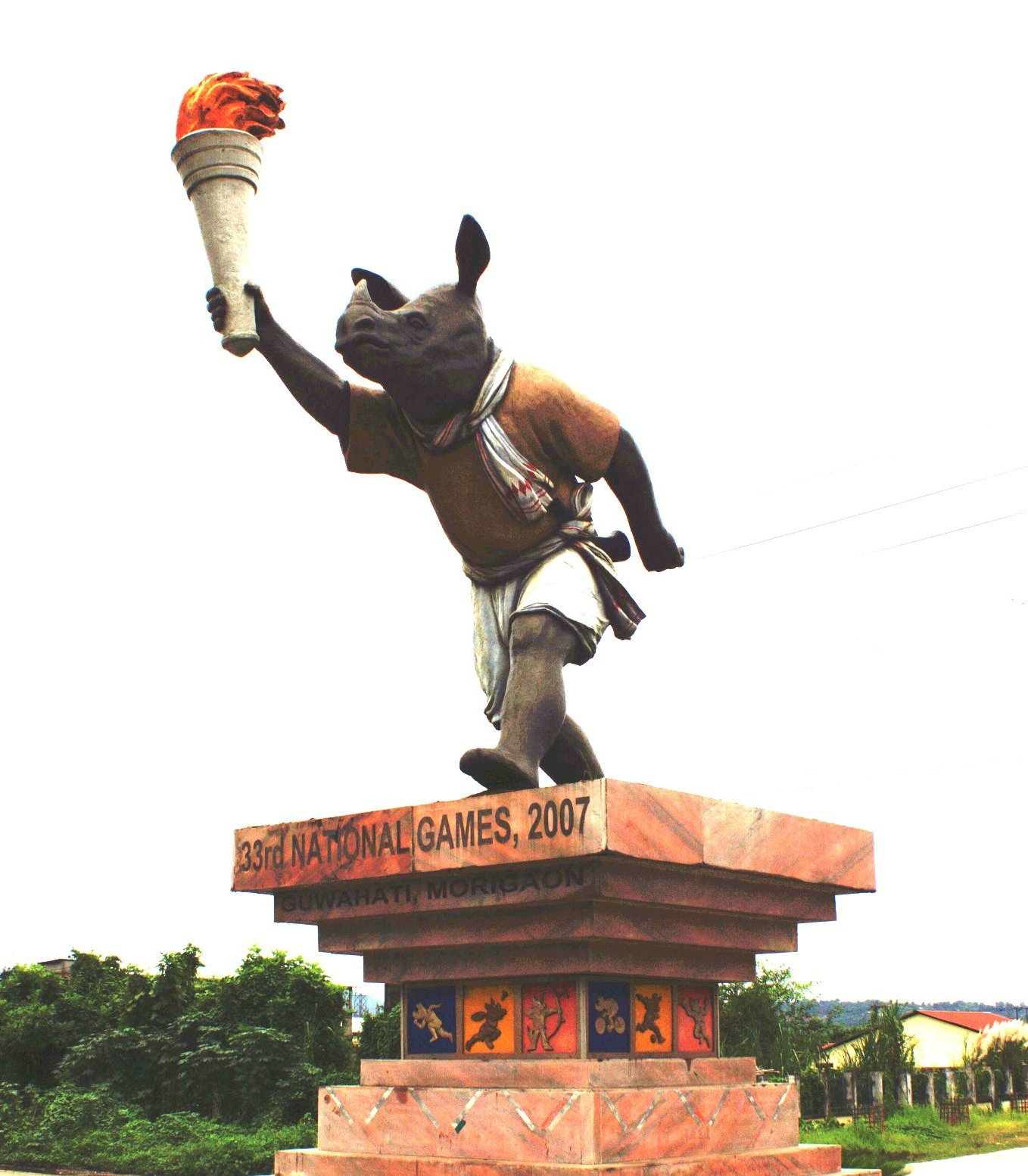
One-Horned Rhino Statue at Arjuna Bhogeswar Baruah Sports Complex

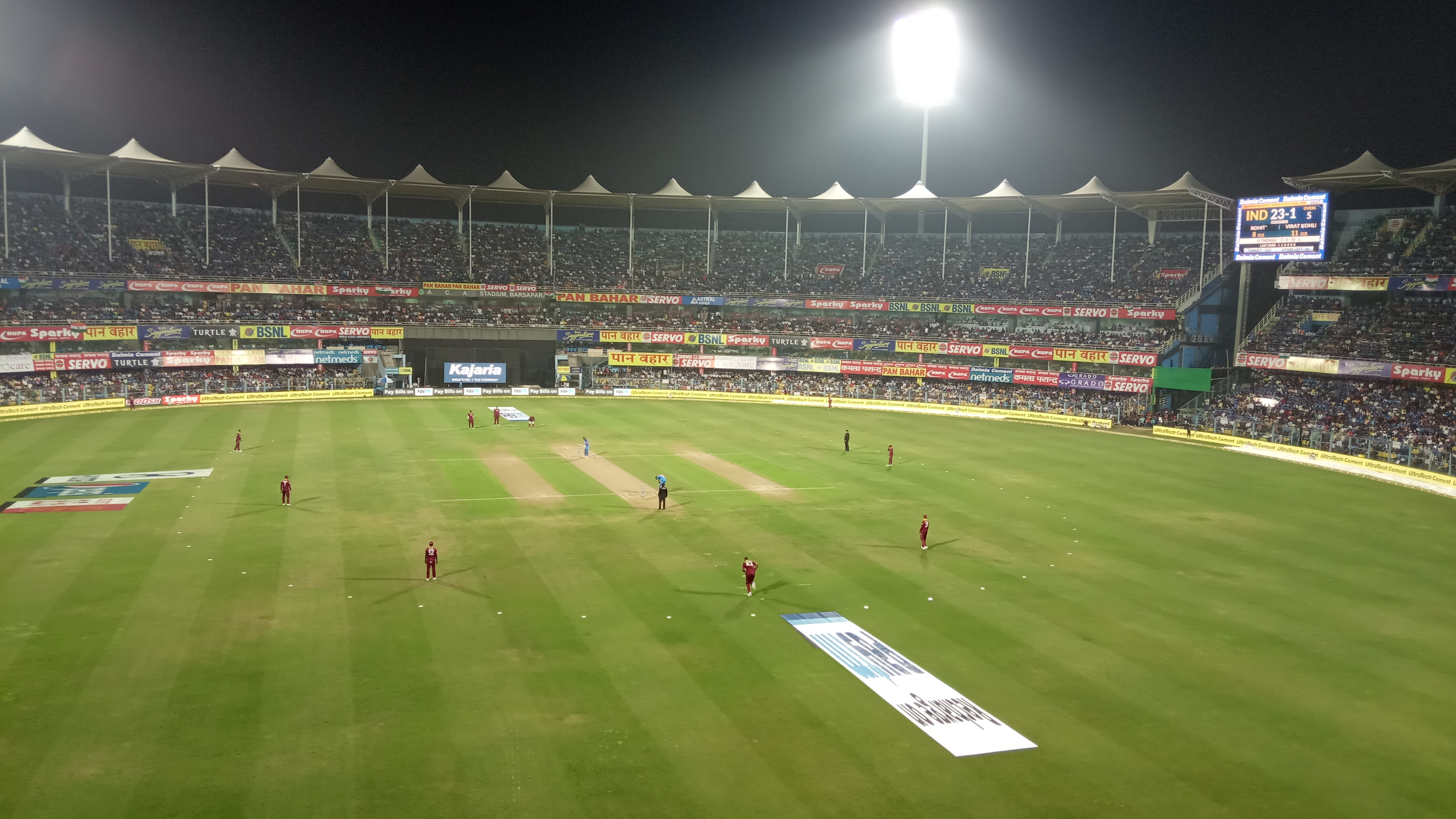
ACA Stadium, Barsapara

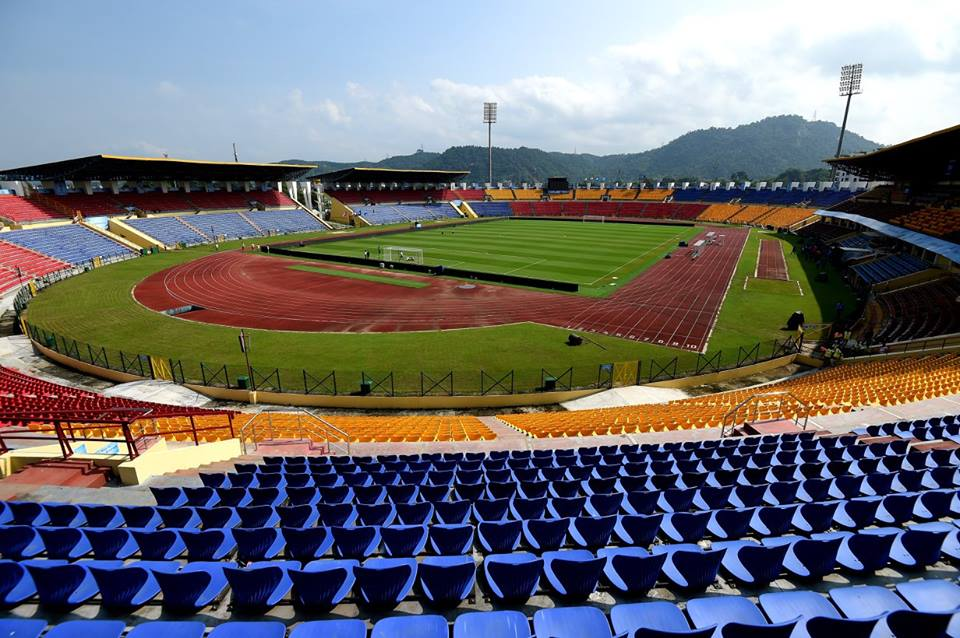
Indira Gandhi Athletic Stadium

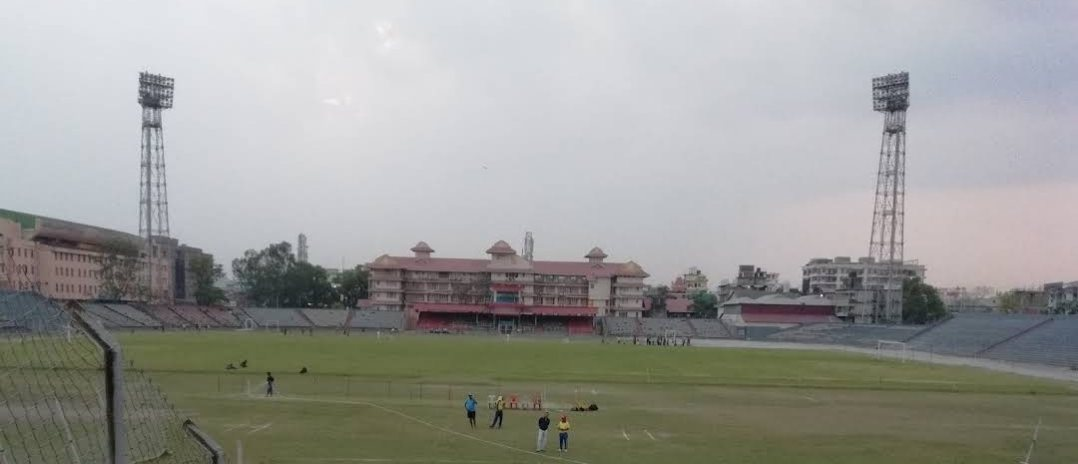
Nehru Stadium, Guwahati

Guwahati features the multi-purpose Nehru Stadium which hosts mostly football and cricket located in the R.G. Baruah Sports Complex, one of the oldest in the city. It comprises the Kanaklata Indoor Stadium (for badminton), swimming pool and tennis courts. The North-East Frontier Railway Stadium of Maligaon, the Sports Authority of India (SAI) complex of Paltan Bazaar and the Judges Field are other prominent sporting venues of the city.

The sporting infrastructures especially constructed for the 33rd National Games in 2007 include Indira Gandhi Athletic Stadium —the main stadium at Arjuna Bhogeswar Baruah Sports Complex, Dr. Zakir Hussain Aquatic Complex, and the Karmabir Nabin Chandra Bordoloi A.C. Indoor Stadium. Other new sports venues include Maulana Md. Tayabullah Hockey Stadium at Bhetapara, Deshbhakta Tarun Ram Phookan Indoor Stadium at Ulubari, Rajiv Gandhi Indoor Stadium at Amingaon, Chachal Tennis Complex and the Tepesia Sports Complex. The renovated sports complexes include Ganesh Mandir Indoor Stadium at Khanapara, Rudra Singha Sports Complex at Dispur and Gauhati University Sports Stadium. The Indira Gandhi Athletic Stadium was also the main venue of the 2016 South Asian Games and the Himalayan Region Games in 2017.

Guwahati is home to the professional football club of Indian Super League (ISL), NorthEast United FC. They play their home matches at the Indira Gandhi Athletic Stadium. The stadium also hosted matches of the FIFA U-17 World Cup in 2017.

The international cricket venue Assam Cricket Association Stadium at Barsapara, is the home of the Assam cricket team. It is the largest cricket stadium in Northeast India with seating capacity of 40,000 and 2nd largest in East India. It hosted an India vs Australia T20I match in 2017 in its international debut. The first ODI in the stadium was held in 2018 between India and West Indies.

Professional sports clubs based in the city
| Club | Sport | League | Stadium | Established |
|---|---|---|---|---|
| NorthEast United FC | Football | Indian Super League | Indira Gandhi Athletic Stadium | 2014 |
| Northeastern Warriors | Badminton | Premier Badminton League | Karmabir Nabin Chandra Bordoloi Indoor Stadium | 2017 |
| Assam Titans Futsal Club | Futsal | North East Futsal League | Karmabir Nabin Chandra Bordoloi Indoor Stadium | N.A. |

== Media and telecommunications ==
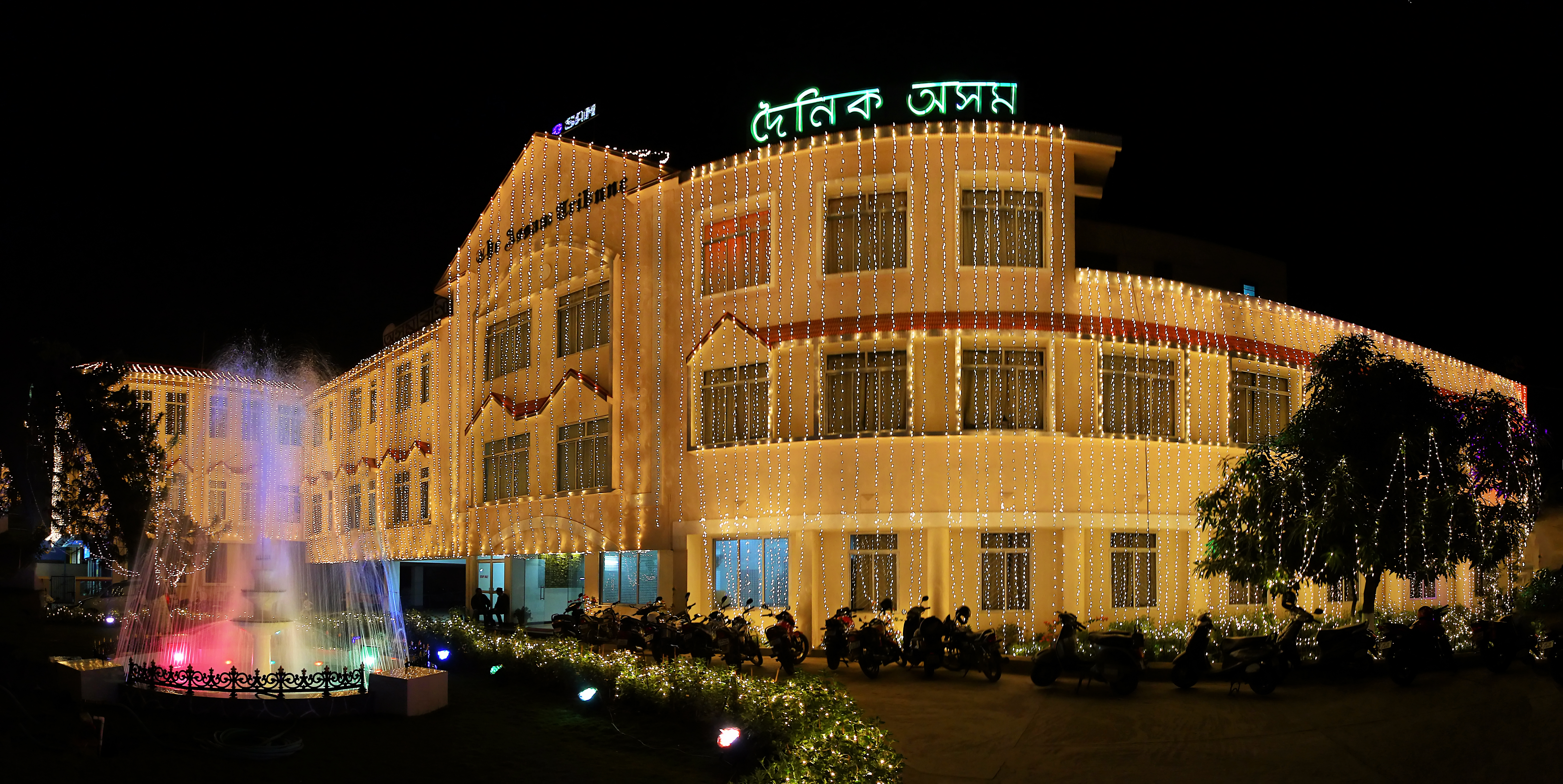
The Dainik Asom building at Chandmari

Assamese daily newspapers published from the city are Dainik Agradoot, Asomiya Pratidin, Asomiya Khabar, Amar Asom, Dainik Janambhumi, Janasadharan, Niyomiya Barta, Dainik Asam, Dainandin Barta and Gana Adhikar. English dailies are The Assam Tribune, The Sentinel, The Telegraph, The Times of India and Eastern Chronicle. Eclectic Northeast is a leading Guwahati-based monthly Northeast magazine with an online version. G Plus is the only English weekly tabloid published from Guwahati.

The state-owned television broadcaster DD Assam provides free-to-air satellite television services. Guwahati-based 24-hour regional satellite news channels include News Live, DY 365, Pratidin Time, Prag News, Assam Talks and News18 Assam North East.

The Guwahati Radio Station of state-owned All India Radio was inaugurated on 1 July 1948 as Shillong-Guwahati Station. The Headquarter of the Shillong-Guwahati Station was shifted from Shillong to Guwahati in 1953. It is a full-fledged Regional broadcasting station with three channels; the Guwahati A & B Channels are AM Channels, and the CBS Channel is an FM Channel. The other FM stations include 92.7 BIG FM, Radio Gup-Shup 94.3 FM, Red FM 93.5 and Radio Mirchi. Telecom services are BSNL, Airtel, Vodafone Idea and Jio.

== Notable places of worship ==
Temples in Guwahati

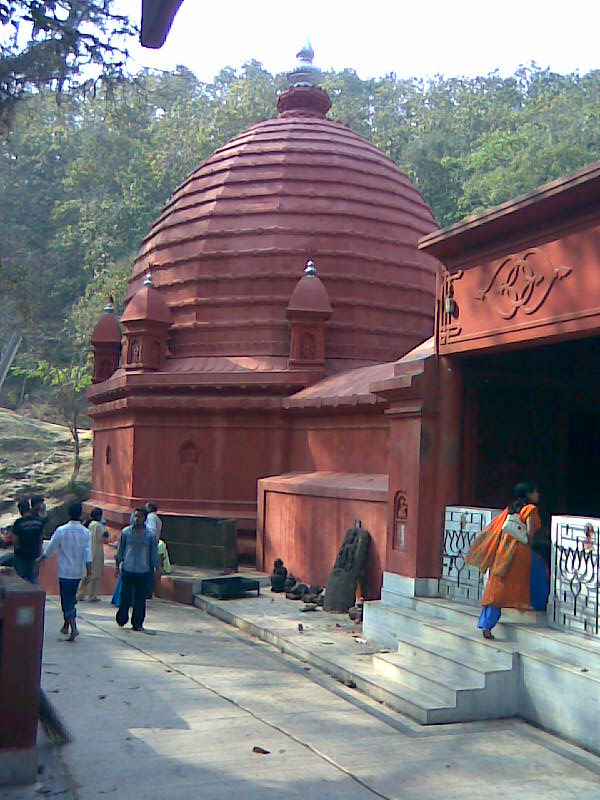
Basistha Temple, re-constructed by Ahom King Rajeswar Singha in CE 1764.

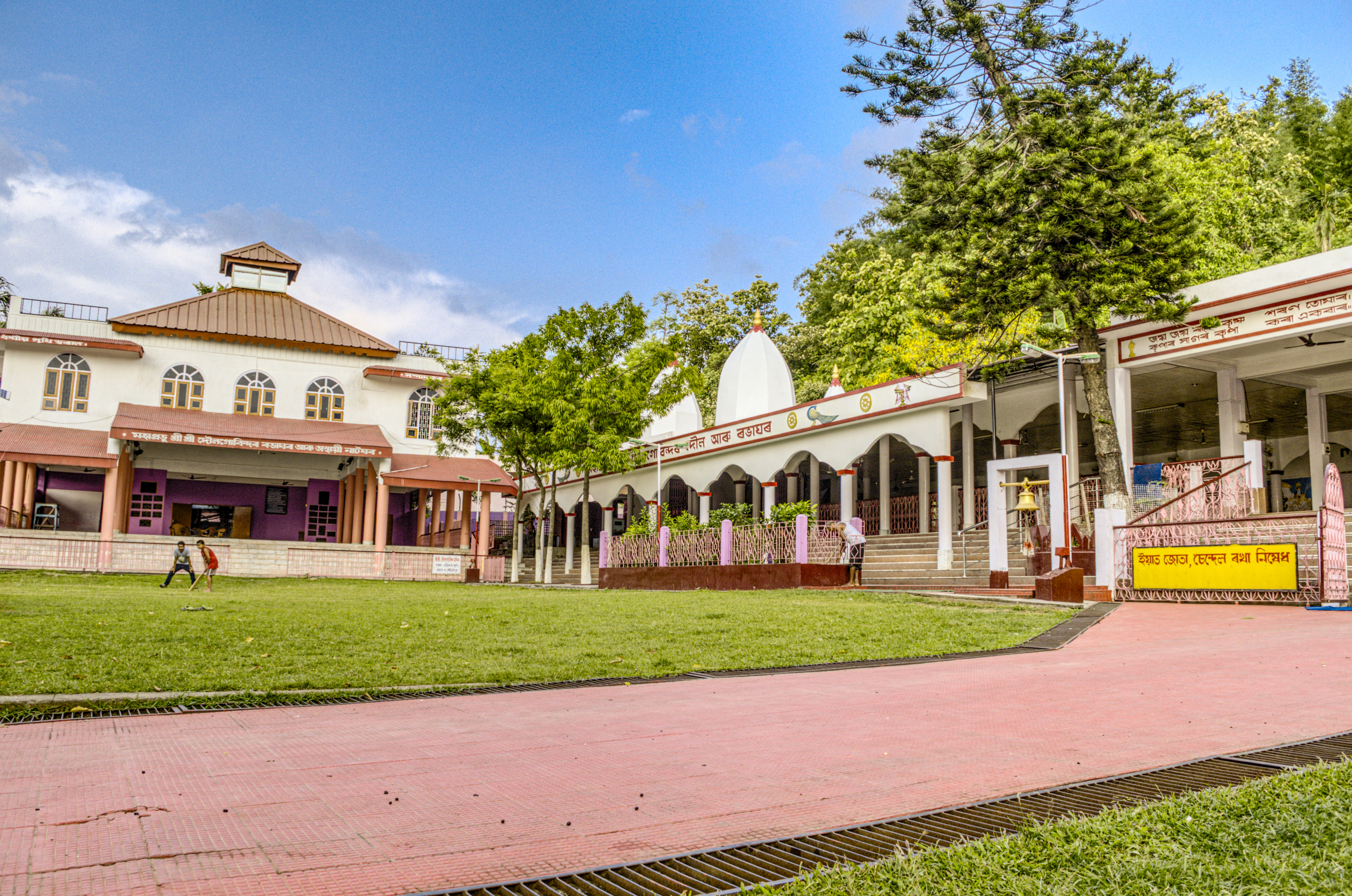
Doul Govinda Temple.

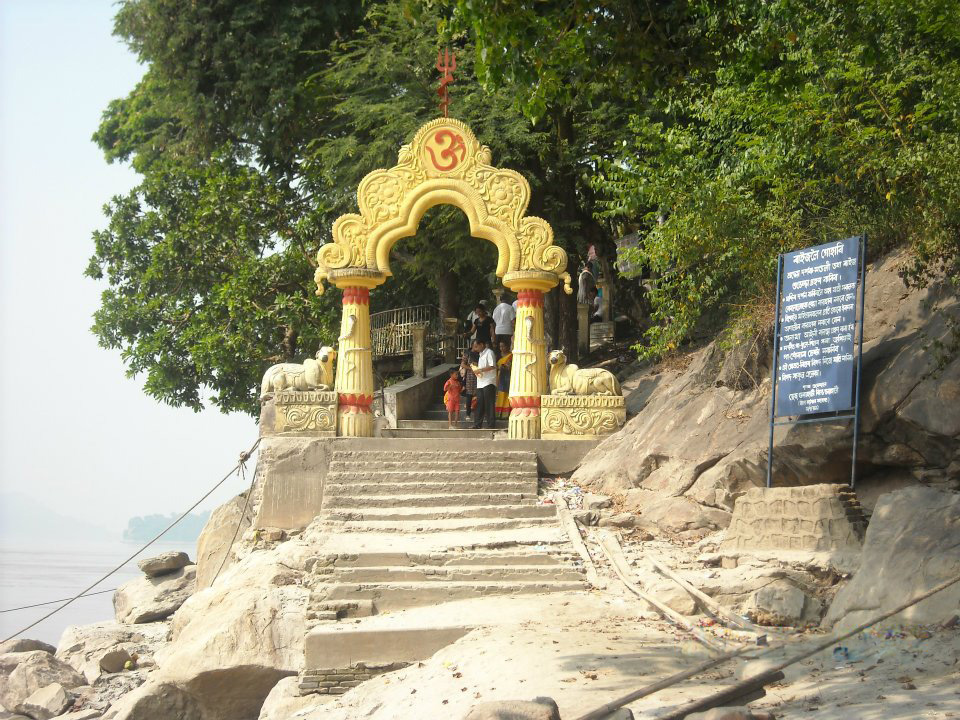
Umananda Temple, constructed by King Gadadhar Singha in CE 1694 on the world's smallest river island.

Kamakhya Temple, the oldest among the Shakti pethas, situated on the top of Nilachal hills.
- Kamakhya Temple
- Rudreswar Temple
- Doul Govinda Temple
- Ugratara Devalaya
- Basistha Temple
- Sukreswar Temple
- Lankeshwar Temple
- Dirgheshwari temple
- Umananda Temple
- Navagraha temples

=== Churches in Guwahati ===
- St. Joseph's Church, Guwahati
- Guwahati Baptist Church (GBC)
- C.N.I Christ Church, Guwahati
- Dispur Baptist Church, Guwahati
- Dispur Catholic Cathedral, Guwahati

== Notable people ==
- Nabakanta Barua, Novelist, Poet and Academician
- Bhupen Hazarika, Playback Singer, Songwriter and Composer
- Khagen Mahanta, Playback Singer, Songwriter and Composer
- Zubeen Garg, Playback Singer, Songwriter, Composer and Actor
- Munin Barua, Film Director from Assamese Film Industry
- Papon (singer), Playback Singer and Composer
- Dipankar Bhattacharjee, Badminton player and Olympian
- Jatin Bora, Actor from Assamese Film Industry
- Barsha Rani Bishaya, Indian Actor from Assamese Film Industry
- Ravi Sarma, Actor from Assamese Film Industry
- Gaurav Bora. Soccer Player
- Ashmita Chaliha, Badminton player
- Utpal Das, Actor from Assamese Film Industry
- Somdev Devvarman, Indian Tennis Player
- Shrinjan Rajkumar Gohain, Indian Chess Player
- Arnab Goswami, Journalist
- Mamoni Raisom Goswami, Novelist and Academician
- Reema Kagti, Indian Director and Screenwriter
- Durgabar Kayastha, Medieval Littérateur
- Abu Nechim, Cricketer
- Nayyara Noor, Singer
- Riyan Parag, Cricketer
- Bhabendra Nath Saikia, Novelist, short story writer and Film Director
- Himanta Biswa Sarma, current Chief Minister of Assam
- Jayanta Talukdar, Indian archer and Olympian
- Shiva Thapa, boxer and Olympian

== See also ==
- Assam State Museum
- Brahmaputra Valley Film Festival
- List of colleges affiliated to Gauhati University
- List of people from Western Assam
- Saraighat Bridge
- Silchar
- Jorhat
- Tezpur
- Nagaon
- Dibrugarh
- Bongaigaon
- Rangia
- Nalbari
- Kamarupa
- Banasura
- Narakasura
- Mura (danava)
- Bhagadatta
- Usha (princess)
- History of Beltola
- Varman dynasty
- Guwahati (disambiguation)
- Gauhati (disambiguation)

== Bibliography ==
- Shin, Jae-Eun (2018), "Region Formed and Imagined: Reconsidering temporal, spatial and social context of Kamarupa", in Dzüvichü, Lipokmar; Baruah, Manjeet (eds.), Modern Practices in North East India: History, Culture, Representation, London & New York: Routledge, pp. 23–55
- Barua, Rai Bahadur Kanak Lal (1933). Early History of Kāmarupa: From the Earliest Times to the End of the Sixteenth Century. The Author.
- Baruah, Swarna Lata (1993). Last Days of Ahom Monarchy: A History of Assam from 1769 to 1826. Munshiram Manoharlal Publishers Pvt. Limited. ISBN 978-81-215-0462-1.
- Gait, Sir Edward Albert (1906). A History of Assam. Thacker, Spink & Company.
- Shin, Jae-Eun (2019). "Redefining Divine Presence: A Study of Hidden Lingas in the Mid-Brahmaputra Valley". Osmund Bopearachchi and Suchandra Ghosh (Eds), Early Indian History and Beyond: Essays in Honour of Professor B. D. Chattopadhyaya, Delhi: Primus Books, Pp. 313-34. Primus Books: 313–334.
