= North East Futsal League =

- Sport: Futsal
- Founded: 2019
- First season: 2019
- No. of teams: 6
- Country: India
- Venues: Guwahati, Assam
- Most recent champion: Mizo Falcons (2019) (1st title)
- Most titles: Mizo Falcons (1 title)

The North East Futsal League is a mixed-gender futsal league in India. The first tournament was held from 25 to 31 August 2019 in Karmbir Nabin Chandra Bordoloi Indoor Stadium, Guwahati, Assam. Six teams from different states competed in the inaugural season.

== Teams ==
S. No.	Team	State
1	Mizo Falcons	Mizoram
2	Nagaland Super Five	Nagaland
3	Arunachal Highlanders	Arunachal Pradesh
4	Meghalaya Thunders	Meghalaya
5	Assam Titans	Assam
6	Apunba Manipur	Manipur

== Foreign players ==
List of foreign players in 2019 season
Team	Women's	Men's
Mizo Falcons	(Spain) Jessica Pastor Carreno	(Nigeria) Michael Okwudili
Nagaland Super Five	(Spain) Patricia Ballesteros Bermero	(Spain) Alex Rubio Carretero
Arunachal Highlanders	(Spain) Paula Boza Gil	(Spain) Mario Navarro Penalver
Meghalaya Thunders	(Spain) Ariana Martos Romero	(Nigeria) Francis Onyeama
Assam Titans	(Spain) Paula Rubio Fernandez	(Spain) Carlos Antonio
Apunba Manipur	(Spain) Joana Garcia Duran	(Nigeria) Henry Opara
