= Dainik Gana Adhikar =

Indian newspaper

- Type: Daily newspaper
- Format: Broadsheet
- Owner(s): Unity Media & Infrastructure Limited
- Publisher: Shahjahan Talukdar
- Editor: Dr. Zakir Hussain
- Founded: 1994
- Language: Assamese
- Headquarters: Guwahati, Assam
- Website: http://www.ganaadhikar.com/

Dainik Gana Adhikar (Assamese: গণ অধিকাৰ, lit. 'Mass Rights') is an Assamese-language regional daily newspaper covering the state of Assam in North-East India. It is published from Guwahati and Silchar. Gana Adhikar is owned by Unity Media & Infrastructure Limited. The newspaper started its journey as a fortnightly in 1994.
