= Bharalu River =

River in India

- Location within Assam Location within India
- Native name: ভৰলু নদী (Assamese)

Location
- State: Assam
- District: Kamrup Metropolitan district

Physical characteristics
- Source: Khasi Hills
  - location: Meghalaya
- Mouth: Brahmaputra River
  - location: Bharalumukh, Guwahati, Assam
  - coordinates: 26°10′29.9″N 91°43′47.1″E

Basin features
- Progression: Bharalu River - Brahmaputra River

The Bharalu River is a tributary of the Brahmaputra River in the Indian state of Assam. The Bharalu River originates in the Khasi Hills of Meghalaya and flows through the heart of Guwahati before its confluence with the Brahmaputra River. Bharalu river is one of the most polluted rivers in the state of Assam.

== Pollution of the Bharalu River ==
Bharalu River carries a large portion of the Guwahati city's municipal wastes. Bharalu serves as the natural drainage in Guwahati and the river carries sewage and wastage from markets, commercial establishments, hotels, restaurants, schools etc. and flows to meet Brahmaputra River at Bharalumukh. The biochemical oxygen demand of the river is 52 mg/L in compared to the permissible limit set by the National River Conservation Directorate (NRCD) at 3 mg/L. Moreover, the obnoxious smell generated by the river is also a health hazard for the residents of Guwahati.
