= Lankeshwar Temple =

Coordinates: 26°08′40″N 91°38′51″E

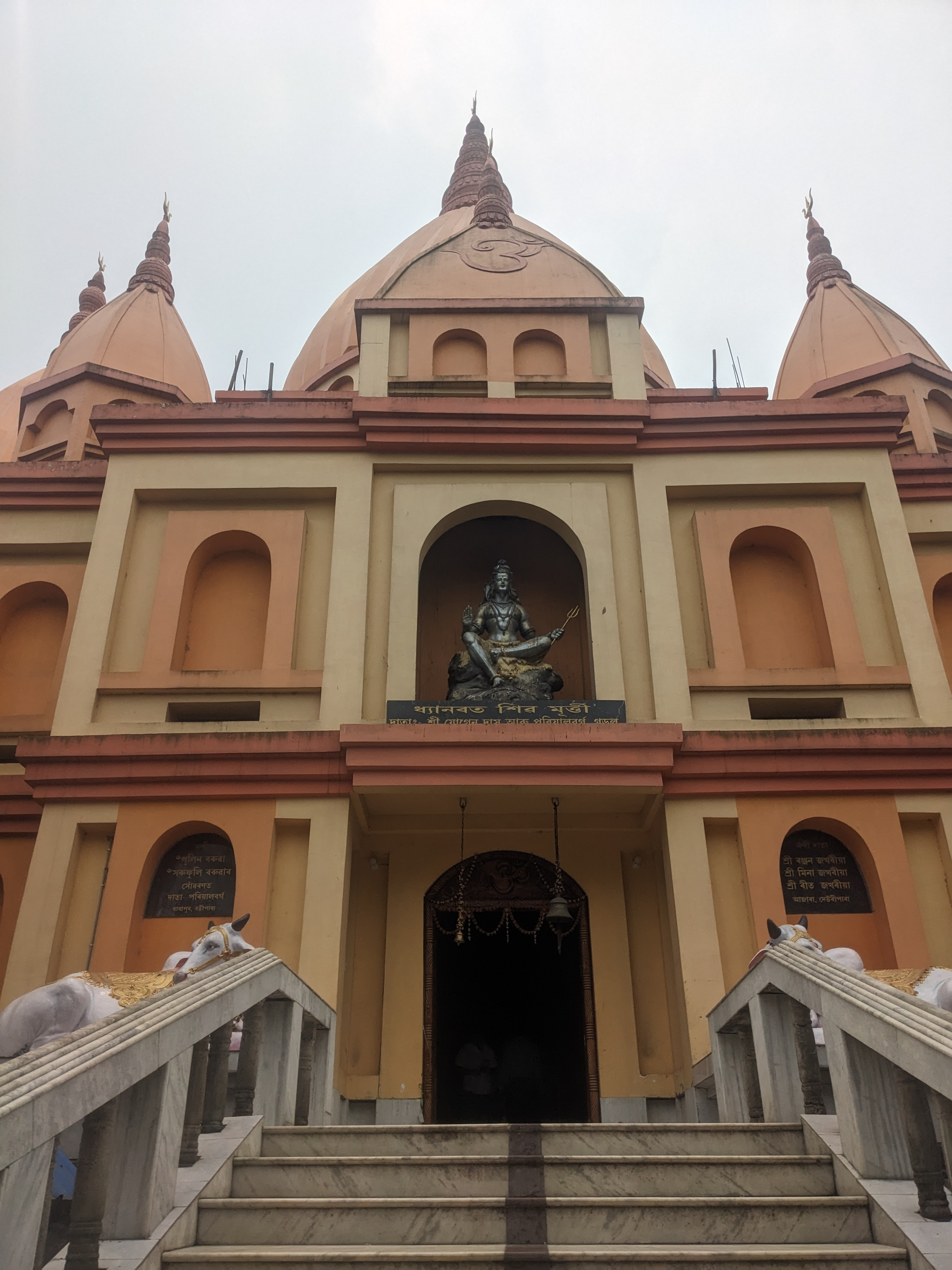
- Lankeshwar Temple

Religion
- Affiliation: Hinduism
- Deity: Shiva

Location
- Location: Guwahati
- State: Assam
- Interactive map of Lankeshwar Temple

Lankeshwar Temple (Assamese: লংকেশ্বৰ দেৱালয়) is an ancient temple dedicated to Shiva on top of a hill in the western part of Guwahati, Assam, India, near the campus of Gauhati University. Lankeshwar is one of the many forms of Lord Shiva. The followers of Lord Shiva considered the temple as one of the most sacred one. Devotees all around the year visit this temple and seek divine blessings.

The Lankeshwar Temple in Guwahati is not only popular with religiously inclined people but with the general tourists also.

Guwahati City Bus Number 6 provides with direct public transportation.

== Gallery ==
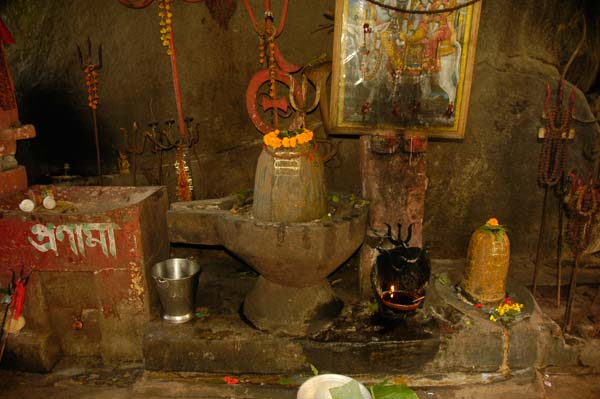

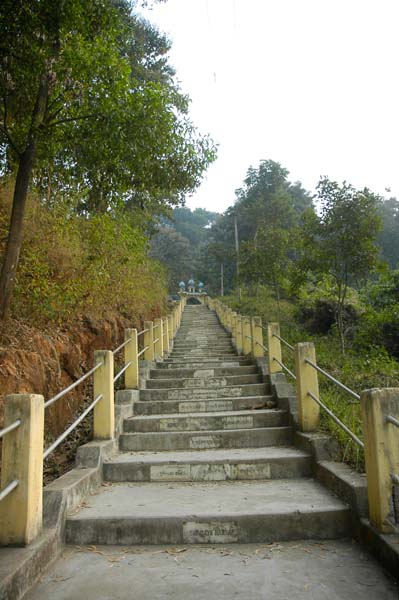
