= Navagraha Mandir, Guwahati =

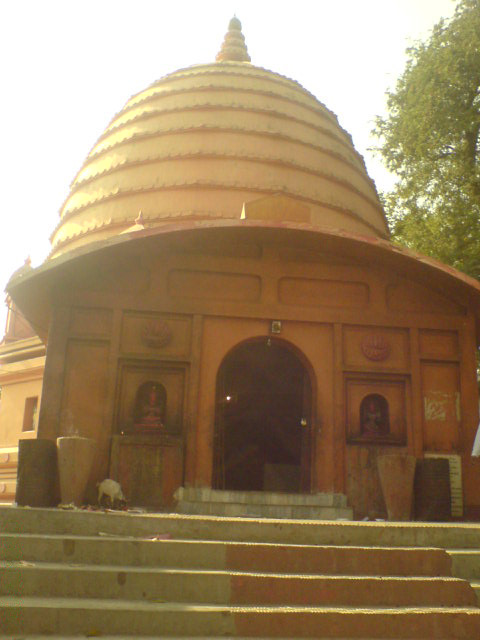
- Navagraha Temple, Guwahati

Religion
- Affiliation: Hinduism

Location
- Interactive map of Navagraha Mandir, Guwahati
- Coordinates: 26°11′27″N 91°45′55″E

Architecture
- Creator: Rajeshwar Singha
- Established: 1752; 274 years ago

Navagraha Mandir is an ancient temple located at Chitrachal Hills (Navagraha Pahaar) in the city of Guwahati, Assam. The temple's Sanctum Sanctorum houses Graha Lingams of Nine Celestial Bodies in accordance with Vedic Astrology. The Graha Lingams of various planets here are – Surya, Chandra, Mangala, Rahu, Shani, Ketu, Bṛhaspati, Buddh and Shukra.

== History ==
This is one the most ancient temples of Assam. Many legends and folklores are associated with the Navagraha temple. Exact information about who first founded this temple is unavailable. Although, it is speculated that the Koch Kings had built the earliest temple structure in the 16th Century. According to an inscription on the temple premises, the temple had suffered extensive damage in the great earthquake of 1697 and was later rebuilt with the help of a pious king, the Ahom Swargadeu Rajeswara Singha who rebuilt the entire temple structure in 1752. Enshrined in this temple are Nine Graha Lingams, representing the nine Celestial bodies, each covered with a colored garment symbolic of each of the celestial bodies.

Connected to this Navagraha temple a nine-cornered (Na-kunia) pond was dug down in the valley south of it. This pond is known as Silpukhuri.

== Temple Procedures ==
In addition to the daily Navagraha Puja in the temple, the Maha Yagna is held for three days on the Sankranti of Maagh-Faagun every year. Unlike the other Shakti Peeth and Siddh Peeth of Assam, there is no sacrificial system in this temple. Only Daan-Dakshina of various edibles and ritualistic offerings of animals like goats & swans are performed along with different Graha Lingam Pooja rituals.
