= Guwahati Tea Auction Centre =

Tea trading facility in Guwahati, India

- Interactive map of the Guwahati Tea Auction Centre area

General information
- Location: Guwahati, Assam, India
- Coordinates: 26.14582°N 91.78943°E
- Inaugurated: 25th September 1970; 55 years ago

Website
- assamteaxchange.com/aboutgtac.aspx

The Guwahati Tea Auction Centre (GTAC) is one of the busiest tea trading facilities in the world. It is located in Guwahati and its primary commodity under the hammer is Assam tea. It was established in 1970. It has seen the largest volume of CTC tea auction in the world.

== See also ==
- Indian tea culture
- Tea processing
