= Nilachal Flyover =

Flyover in Guwahati, Assam, India

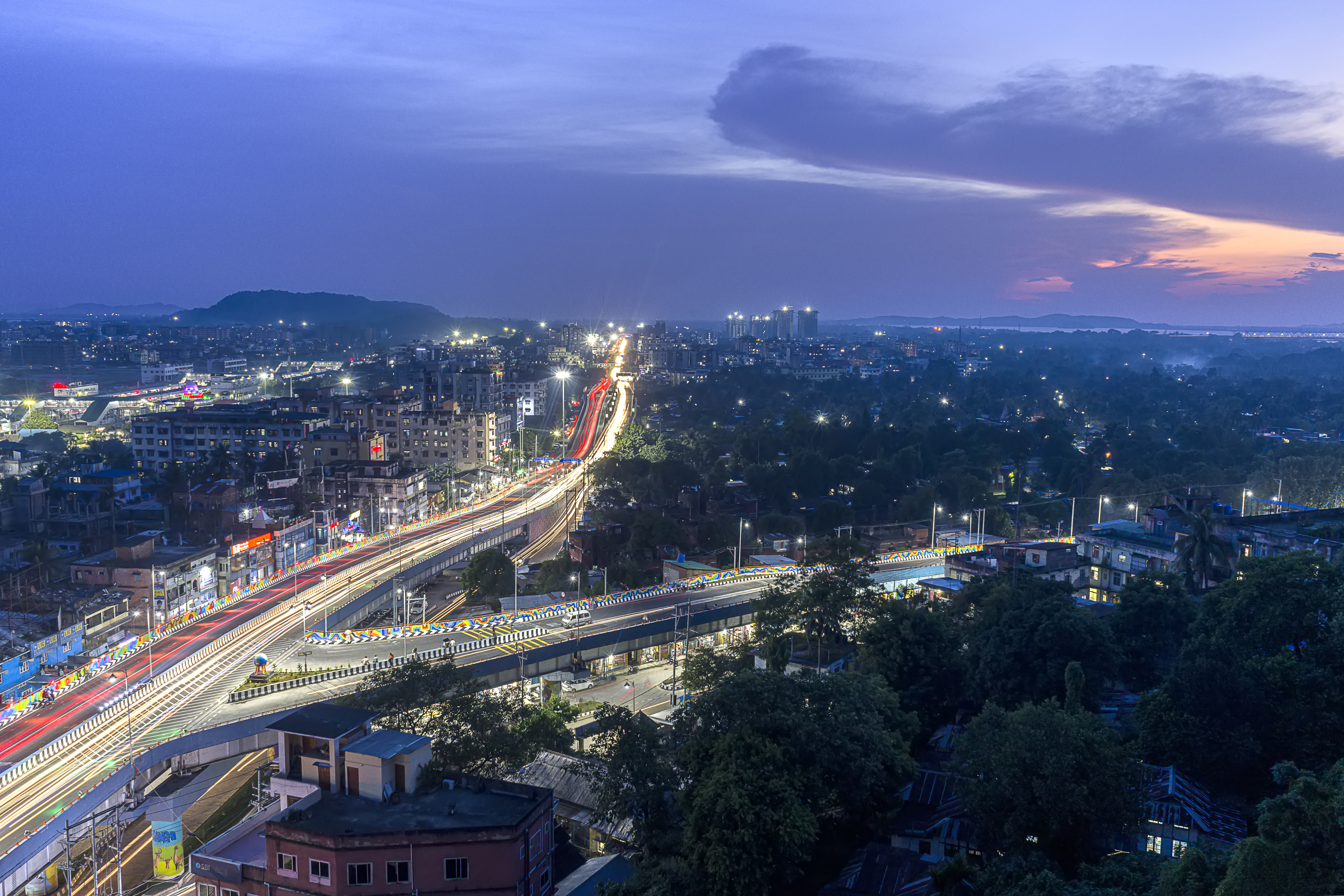
A panoramic view of the Maligaon Flyover

Nilachal Flyover, also known as Maligaon Flyover, is a 2.6-kilometre long flyover in the Maligaon locality of Guwahati, Assam, India. It is currently the second longest flyover in the state of Assam, built above the AT Road and connects Maligaon Chariali with Kamakhya Gate. The flyover also has a 300-metre two-lane extended arm that connects the flyover with the Pandu Ghat Feeder Road, providing seamless connectivity with the Pandu Ghat. Designed by the Public Works Department (PWD) Assam, the flyover has been constructed by a joint venture of Shree Gautam Construction Pvt Ltd and Anupam Nirman Pvt Ltd. The flyover was inaugurated on 30 August 2023 by the Chief Minister of Assam Himanta Biswa Sarma.

== History ==
The foundation of the Maligaon Flyover was laid on 11 October 2020 by the then Chief Minister of Assam Sarbananda Sonowal. The construction of this flyover was announced as part of the rapid development in Guwahati with the vision of establishing the city as a gateway to the entire South East Asia. The estimated cost for the construction of the flyover was 383.72 crores, although at the later stage it escalated to 420.75 crores.
