= History of Beltola =

Beltola is a prime residential area in the southern part of Guwahati, Assam. It is an adjoining area of the Dispur capital complex. During Ahom reign, Beltola was a small Koch kingdom, whose ruler assisted in the administration of the Borphukan in Guwahati, the Ahom viceroy of Lower Assam and in maintaining relations with the communities of Khasi Hills. The kingdom of Beltola survived under the British rule and existed till 1947 when it finally joined the Union of India.

== Brief history of Beltola ==
It is speculated that the word Beltola comes from the word Bilvapatra, which means leaves of Bael tree, used in religious ceremonies. It is said that in the past large quantities of Bael tree leaves were sent to Kamakhya Temple to be used in rituals. The word 'tola' in Bengali refers to a place underneath something. It was from that time that the place was called Beltola.

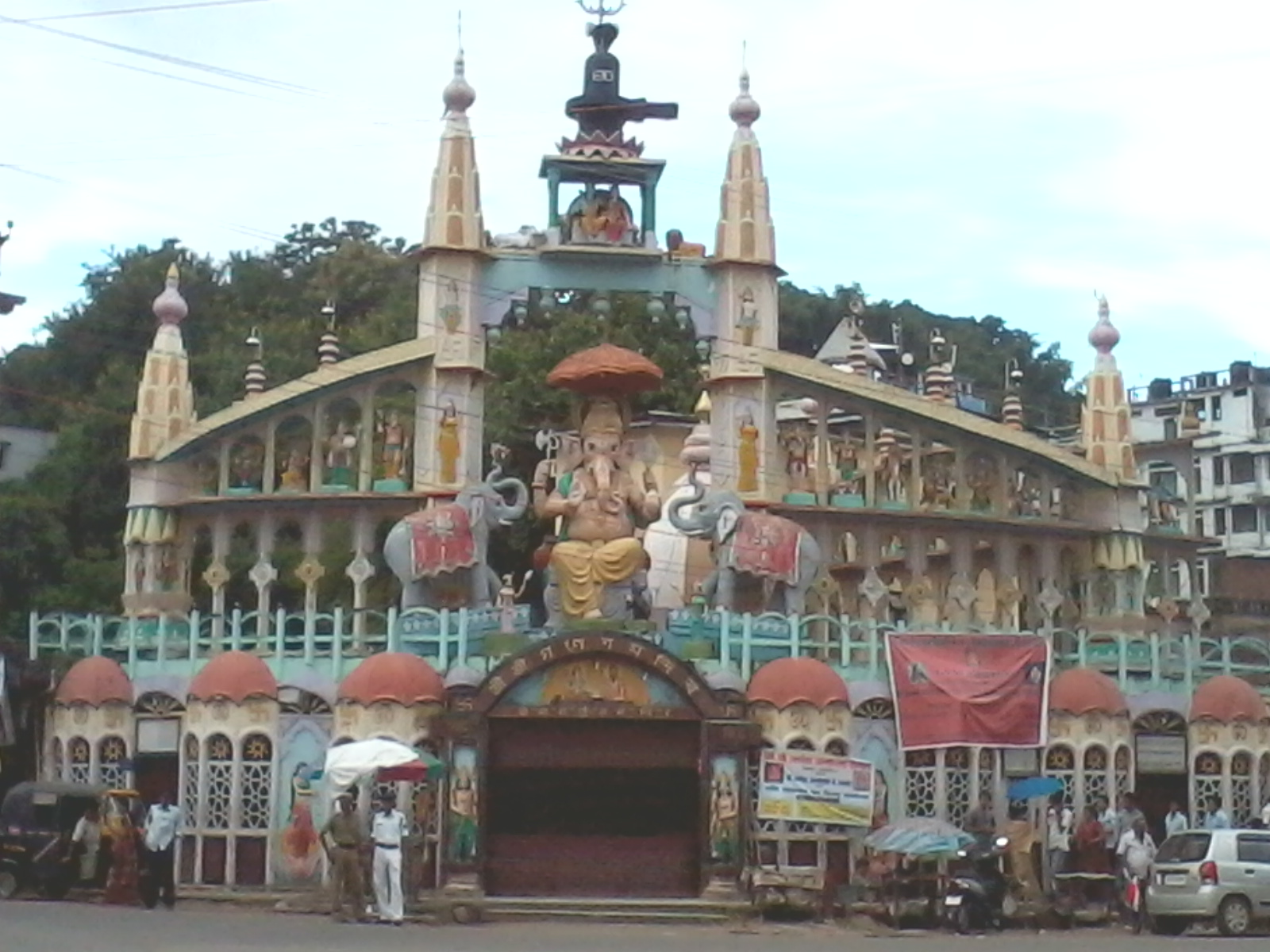
Ganesh temple in Ganeshguri, Beltola Mouza, Guwahati

According to legend Beltola was located in the entrance of the old city of Guwahati where the famous temple of Kamakhya is situated, the Ganesh deity at the Ganesh temple in Ganeshguri, serves as a gatekeeper. Therefore, the Ganesh temple may be as ancient as the Kamakhya temple. This theory was inspired by the mythical story of Ganesha guarding the entrance of the house, while his mother Devi Parvati was bathing.

The region was ruled by a chief who styled himself as Herambadhipati (Heramba is another name for Ganesha) in the late 16th century. An inscription mentions that the ruler named Dununtrarāi donated a tank in Pragjyotishpura in the year 1577 A.D. Early inhabitants of Beltola consisted mostly of Garos, Karbis, Lalungs, Rabha and Koch-Kachari, while small numbers of Manipuris, Kalitas and Muslims in Beltola are settlers of later periods.

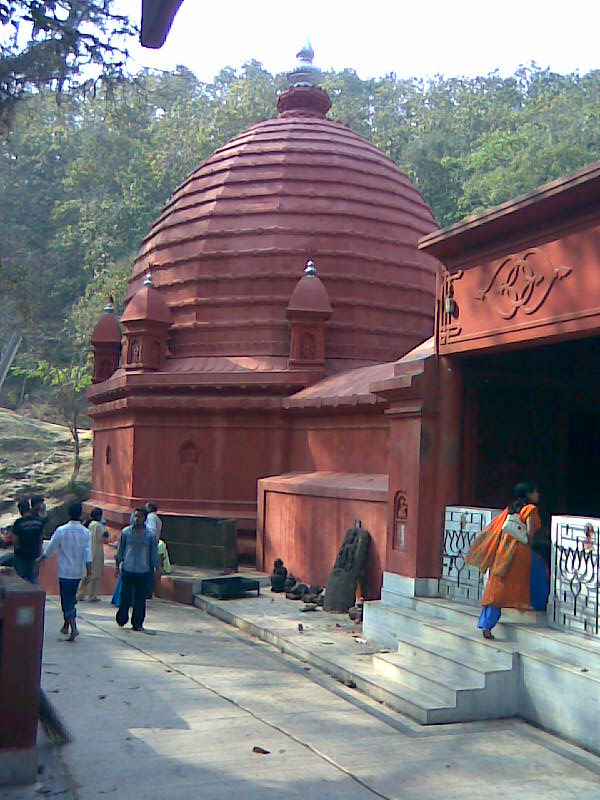
Basistha Temple in Basisthashram, Beltola Mouza, Guwahati

In 1613 CE, Parikshit Narayan, the ruler of Koch Hajo, was defeated by the Mughals. He was taken as a prisoner and was escorted to Delhi, where he had an audience with Mughal Emperor Jahangir. On acknowledging Mughal supremacy and on the agreement of an annual tribute of four lakhs rupees, the Emperor returned his kingdom. While on his way back, Parikshit Narayan fell ill and died. On his death, the Mughals annexed his kingdom and set up Hajo as their headquarters in Assam. Bijit Narayan, the young son of Parikshit Narayan, was set up as a tributary king of a small state, named after him, called Bijni. On the defeat of Parikshit Narayan, his two brothers Balinarayan and Gaj Narayan fled to the Ahom Kingdom and sought refuge from Ahom King Pratap Singha. Pratap Singha had married the daughter of Parikshit Narayan, Mangaldohi, and later set up the Mangaldoi town in her respect. Owing to this matrimonial alliance, Pratap Singha granted refuge to these Koch princes.

Meanwhile, the Mughal Governor demanded their extradition, which Pratap Singha refused. This and other causes of offence led the Mughal Governor to decide on the invasion of the Ahom Kingdom, leading to the Ahom-Mughal conflict. The invading Mughal forces were defeated and driven back to their own territory. After the victory, in 1615 CE Pratap Singha installed Balinarayan as the tributary ruler of Darrang and renamed him as Dharmanarayan, while his brother Gaj Narayan was set up as a tributary ruler in Beltola. Gajnarayan was instructed to administer under the supervision of Borphukan, the Ahom viceroy of Lower Assam. Gaj Narayan and his descendants ruled Beltola as tributary chiefs under the Ahom sovereigns. Treasury records of the late Ahom period showed that the rulers of Beltola used to pay 2500 rupees as annual tribute to the Ahom Government. The Basisthashram or Basistha Temple also comes under Beltola Mouza. It was built by Ahom King Rajeswar Singha in the middle of the 18th century.

After the fall of the Ahom Kingdom in Assam, Beltola came under British occupation. The British divided the erstwhile Ahom Kingdom into Mouzas or revenue circles for smooth administration. In each Mouza, one Mouzadar was appointed who was entrusted with the task of collecting taxes and administration. The British reduced the status of Beltola from a kingdom to a Mouza and that of the ruler from King to Mouzadar, though certain terms were set up in favour of the royal family. Beltola Mouza was specially categorised as Raj Mouza or Principality. The rulers were allowed to retain the title of Raja in their names, and the official post of the Mouzadar of Beltola was made hereditary and was reserved for the royal family of Beltola. After the independence of India in 1947, the Government of India abolished zamindarii or the system of land lords in 1956, due to which the royal family of Beltola lost much of their land rights. Later, in 1974, the Government of India abolished all the special privileges bestowed to former royal families of India. The royal family of Beltola was also affected by these changes, and the rank of Beltola Mouza was demoted from Raj Mouza to that of a general category Mouza. The official post of Mouzadar remained with the royal family, and till now the post of Mouzadar was held hereditarily by them, though they do not have any power of administration except collecting land taxes for the Government of Assam.

== Extent of Beltola Mouza ==
The kingdom of Beltola extended from the borders of the kingdom of Rani in the west, while in the east it extends to the borders of the kingdom of Mayong and Dimorua. After the fall of the Ahom kingdom and the British occupation of Assam, Beltola lost its status as an independent kingdom and was converted into a Mouza or revenue circle. Under British rule, the size of the Beltola Mouza was much reduced. Presently, Beltola Mouza consists of several parts of modern-day Guwahati city. Centrally located around Beltola haat or Beltola Bazaar, the Mouza or estate covers the area of Narengi, Birkuchi, Hengrabari, Panjabari, Hatigaon, Bhetapara, Maidam gaon, Rukminigaon, Khanapara, Kahilipara, Ganeshguri and Basistha Mandir. It was said that the Royal residence of the Beltola royal family was in Rukminigaon, while the place where the royal elephants were kept and trained was Hatigaon, literally meaning village of elephants (in Assamese Hati means elephant; gaon means village). Maidam gaon was said to be the place of cremation of the royal family members. It was said that the ruler of Beltola used to capture elephants and indulge in the profitable business of selling elephants. It can be assumed that the Khasi people living in that region were involved in capturing elephants for the rulers of Beltola, due to which the name Kainapara or later Khanapara came into existence. The old name of Khanapara was Kainapara. Kaina is a Khasi word, which means elephant, while Para in Khasi language means human settlements or colony Birkuchi name comes from the combination of two words: Bir means heroes, and Kuchi means camp. It was said that the Koch army of Chilarai had set up a camp in the area, and thus the place got its name.

== Koch rulers of Beltola ==
- Raja Gaj Narayan Dev (brother of Parikshit Narayan, last ruler of Koch Hajo, brother of Balinarayan, first Koch ruler of Darrang).
- Raja Shivendra Narayan Dev (Son of Raja Gaj Narayan)
- Raja Gandharva Narayan Dev (Son of Raja Shivendra Narayan):

Raja Gandharva Narayan Dev witnessed the climax of Ahom-Mughal conflicts. When he was still a prince, he joined the Ahom forces led by Lachit Borphukan against the invading Mughal forces led by Raja Ram Singh I of Amber and participated in the famous Battle of Saraighat, in which the Ahoms won a decisive victory against the Mughals. After the victory, Lachit Borphukan received permission from the Ahom king Udayaditya Singha to install Gandharva Narayan as the king of Beltola.

- Raja Uttam Narayan Dev (Son of Raja Gandharva Narayan Dev)
- Raja Dhwaja Narayan Dev (Son of Raja Uttam Narayan Dev)
- Raja Jay Narayan Dev (Son of Raja Dhwaja Narayan Dev)
- Raja Lambodar Narayan Dev (Son of Raja Jay Narayan Dev):

Raja Lambodar Narayan Dev witnessed the fall of Ahom supremacy and the decline of Ahom Kingdom. The British, after driving the Konbaung dynasty of Burma out of Assam, became the new masters of the Brahmaputra valley. In October 1826, Raja Lombodar Narayan Dev signed an ordinance with the British East India Company, acknowledging their overlordship. Raja Lambodar Narayan Dev married a Manipuri Princess, who was accompanied by a caravan of Manipuri people. These Manipuri people were settled in Beltola, and their settlement was known as Manipuri Basti (not to be confused with Manipuri Basti of present-day Guwahati city).

- Raja Lokpal Narayan Dev (Son of Raja Lambodar Narayan Dev):

Raja Lokpal Narayan Dev succeeded Raja Lambodar Narayan Dev as the new ruler of Beltola. It was during his reign that the British reduced the status of Beltola from a kingdom to that of a Mouza or revenue circle. The status of the ruler was reduced to that of an official post of Mouzadar, one who collects revenue and administers the Mouza. Yet, some of the terms and conditions were framed in favour of Raja Lokpal Narayan Dev. Beltola Mouza was listed specially in the category of Raj Mouza. The rulers of Beltola were allowed to retain the title of Raja in their names, and the official post of Mouzadar would be held hereditarily by the royal family of Beltola. Still communication letters between Raja Lokpal Narayan Dev and the British officials suggested that Raja Lokpal Narayan Dev was not happy with the treatment meted out by the British towards him. Raja Lokpal Narayan Dev married Padmavati Devi alias Padumi. She was the daughter of the king of Mayong. The couple had three sons, Amrit Narayan Dev, Chandra Narayan Dev and Lakshmi Narayan Dev. Raja Lokpal Narayan Dev died in 1863 CE.

- Raja Amrit Narayan Dev (Son of Raja Lokpal Narayan Dev):

Raja Amrit Narayan Dev was the elder son of Raja Lokpal Narayan Dev and succeeded his father as the ruler of Beltola. He married Rani Lambeswari Devi, who was a princess of the neighbouring kingdom of Dimorua. The couple was childless. During his reign, due to some irregularity in the payment of revenue by him, the British Government officially reduced the size of the Beltola Mouza.

- Raja Chandra Narayan Dev (Son of Raja Lokpal Narayan Dev):

Raja Chandra Narayan Dev succeeded his elder brother, Raja Amrit Narayan Dev, as the ruler of Beltola. Raja Chandra Narayan Dev was not only an efficient ruler but also a shrewd businessman. His business of selling elephants earned him a lot of profits. For business purposes, he had to visit Calcutta frequently. Therefore, for his convenience in staying there, he constructed a mansion, which was known as Beltola House. He was also active in social activities and in acts of charity. The 1897 Assam earthquake rocked Assam and its neighbouring regions, causing massive loss of lives and property. Raja Chandra Narayan Dev extended aid and relief to the earthquake victims and helped them in getting back to their normal lives. In recognition of his valuable services to the earthquake victims, the British Government of India officially invited him to Delhi for the occasion of King Edward VII's coronation as Emperor of India and awarded a silver medal and a certificate. Raja Chandra Narayan Dev had two wives, Ahalya Devi and Giribala Devi, who begot him two sons and two daughters. Ahalya Devi was the mother of the elder son Rajendra Narayan Dev and a daughter Labanyaprabha Devi, who was later married into the family of Zamindar or Landlord of Rupsi in Dhubri district in Assam. Giribala Devi was the mother of Pabindra Narayan Dev, the second son of Raja Chandra Narayan Dev and a daughter, Bhubaneshwari Devi (married to a zamindar family (Talukdar) of Palasbari district). Raja Chandra Narayan Dev arranged western education facilities for his sons at Calcutta. Unfortunately, the promising ruler died in 1910 CE, leaving both his sons at a minor age.

- Raja Rajendra Narayan Dev (Son of Raja Chandra Narayan Dev):

Raja Rajendra Narayan Dev succeeded his father Raja Chandra Narayan Dev as the new ruler of Beltola. When his father died, Rajendra Narayan Dev was only 10 years of age. Therefore, after approval from Rani Ahalya Devi, the British Government appointed Rai Saheb Chidananda Choudhury to look after the administration of Beltola Mouza till Rajendra Narayan Dev attained adulthood. After completing his college education at Calcutta, Rajendra Narayan Dev joined the newly established Earl Law College at Guwahati, founded by Gyanadaviram Barua, son of noted Assamese writer Gunaviram Burua and maternal grandfather of famous actress of the Hindi cinematic world Sharmila Tagore. After completing his law education, as a lawyer, he joined the Guwahati High Court and was also associated with the Calcutta High Court. In 1923 CE, he was formally bestowed with the responsibilities of Beltola Mouza and became its new ruler as Raja Rajendra Narayan Dev. He married Rani Lakshmipriya Devi, who hailed from a prominent Phukan family of Jorhat. Her father's name was Gadadhar Phukan, and noted Assamese poet, writer and social worker Nilomoni Phukan was her uncle. Raja Rajendra Narayan Dev was associated with many social activities, and because he qualified as a lawyer, the British Government granted him magisterial power to settle disputes and impart justice to the people of Beltola Mouza. Raja Rajendra Narayan Dev and his brother Pabindra Narayan Dev were members of the football Club, known as Guwahati Town Club, and both were known as good football players. In 1933 CE, tragedy struck the royal family when Pabindra Narayan Dev committed suicide, after killing his wife and his child at the royal residence of Beltola. After this tragic incident, Raja Rajendra Narayan Dev abandoned the royal residence, considering it inauspicious. Earlier, Pabindra Narayan Dev had borrowed a large sum of money as debt from one of his friends, putting the royal residence as security, to guarantee the return of the amount. After his death, his friend obtained permission from the British Government and put the royal residence and its articles on lease to get his money back. The royal residence got destroyed in the process. In 1937 CE, while on a hunting excursion Raja Rajendra Narayan Dev got hit by bullet accidentally and succumb to his wounds, leaving his wife Rani Lakshmipriya Devi and his three minor children, two sons and one daughter.

- Rani Lakshmipriya Devi (wife of Raja Rajendra Narayan Dev):

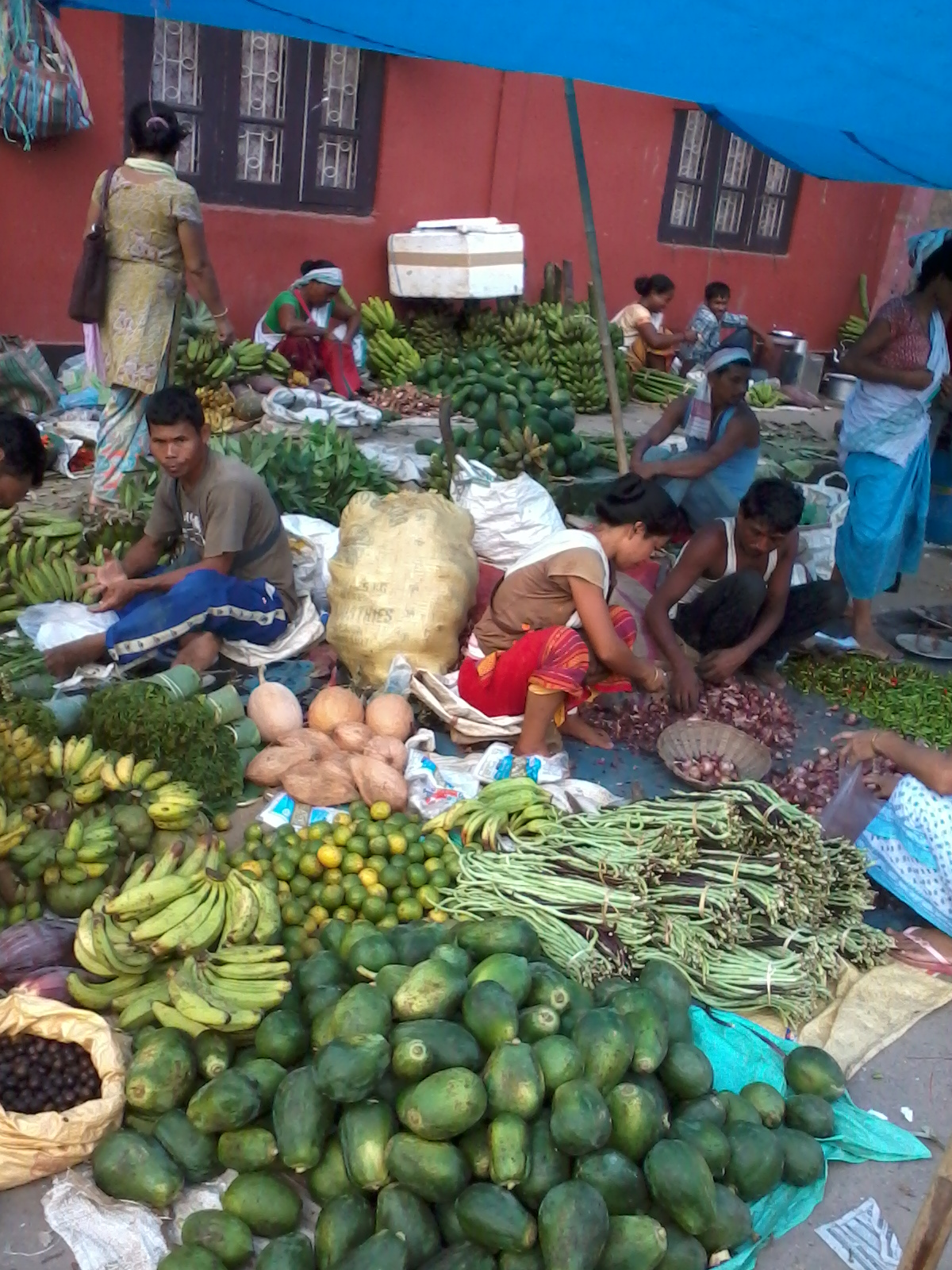
Fruits and vegetable market in Historic Beltola Bazaar

Rani Lakshmipriya Devi took up the administration of Beltola Mouza in 1937 CE after her husband Raja Rajendra Narayan Dev died suddenly in an accident on a hunting excursion. Since their children, two sons and one daughter, were minors, the queen undertook to look after the administration of Beltola Mouza. Due to her efficiency in handling the administration, Rani Lakshmipriya Devi became very popular among the people of Beltola. She actively participated in the welfare programs of the people and performed charity in various religious ceremonies. She took utmost care for the education of her children. Her elder son, Kumar Jatindra Narayan Dev, after completion of his college education, was sent to the Colorado School of Mines in the United States of America. Her second son, Dwijendra Narayan Dev, was also a prominent film producer and director, followed by his son Indrajit Narayan Dev. After India's independence in 1947, the power of administration of Beltola Mouza was transferred to the Government of Assam. In 1956 CE, the Government of India abolished the Zamindari system of landlords. Due to this, the royal family of Beltola lost much of their lands, which were distributed to the landless peasants. In 1974 CE, the Government of India abolished all the special privileges bestowed to former royal families of India. The royal family of Beltola was also affected by these changes, and the rank of Beltola Mouza was demoted from Raj Mouza to that of a general category Mouza.

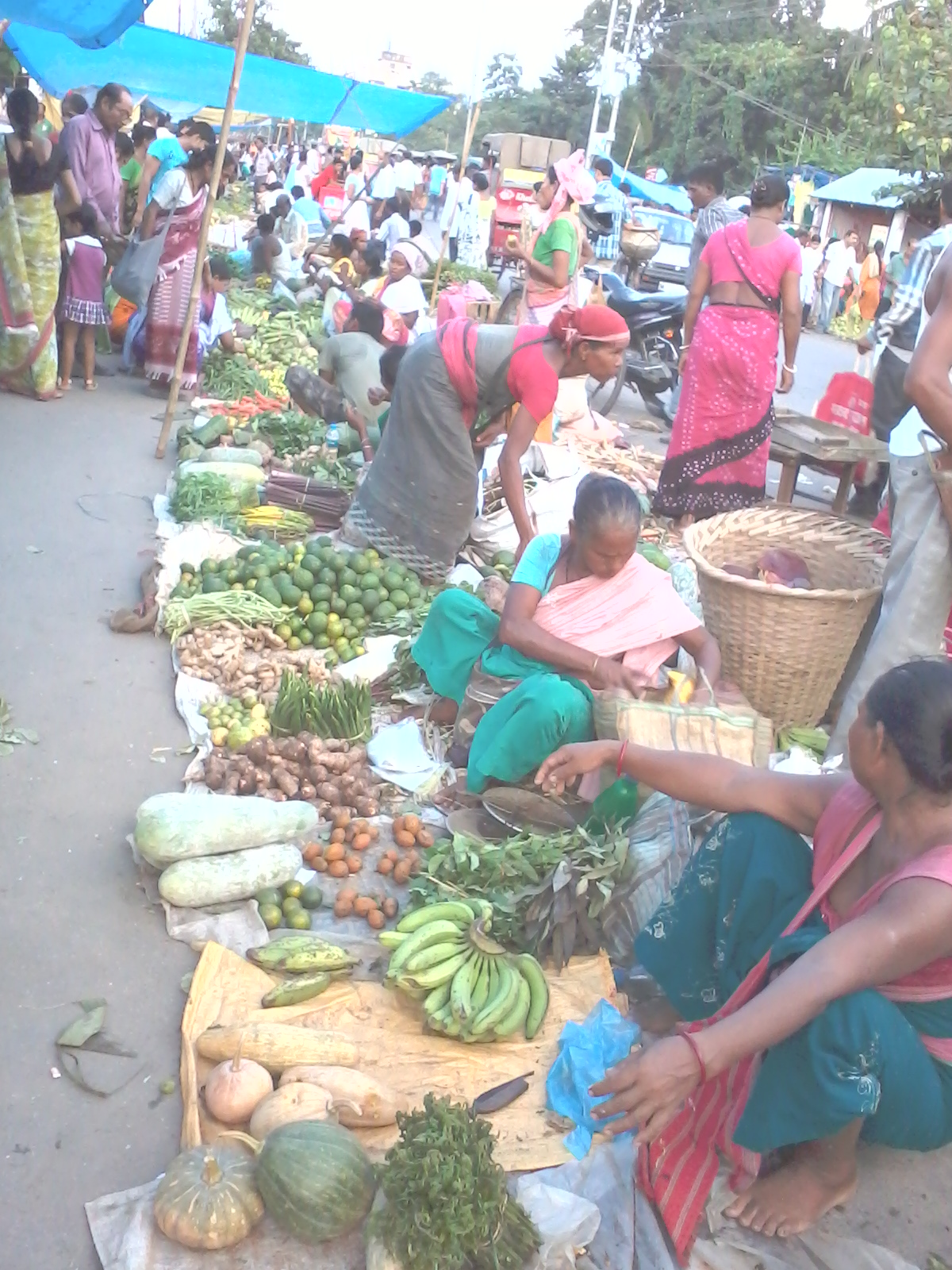
Women from various indigenous ethnic communities engaged in business in Historical Beltola Haat or Beltola Bazaar

Despite the loss of power and privileges, Rani Lakshmipriya Devi continued her social welfare programs for the common people. She also raised her voice for the indigenous Assamese communities of Beltola Mouza when the population of the local indigenous communities faced the threat to their existence due to the settlement of a large number of people from different parts of Assam in Beltola, as the city of Guwahati expanded into Beltola Mouza. She also worked to protect the rights of indigenous communities in the historical Beltola Haat or Beltola Bazaar, when some outside business community tried to expel them. It was partly because of her effort that the historical Beltola Haat or Beltola Bazaar still retains the indigenous character of being a meeting point for the people from hills and plains. Rani Lakshmipriya died in 1991, at the age of 80 years. Her daughter Madhuri Choudhury wrote several books on her life and several others on the history of Beltola. The royal family of Beltola still holds the official post of Mouzadar of Beltola Mouza, though they do not have any power of administration except collecting land taxes for the Government of Assam.

== Beltola after India's independence ==
After India's independence from the East India Company in 1947, Guwahati became the most prominent city of Assam, but the Beltola Mouza remained excluded from the city. In 1973 CE, Sarat Chandra Singha, the then Chief Minister of Assam, upon the creation of the state of Meghalaya, decided to shift the capital of Assam from Shillong to a small village named Dispur in Beltola Mouza. This village was selected as the temporary capital of Assam, which led to the shifting of all important government offices to Dispur. People from different parts of Assam migrated and settled in and around Dispur, quickly converting the rural area into a thickly populated zone. As the year progressed, the city of Guwahati expanded, and Dispur and Beltola were integrated into the Greater Guwahati city. Dispur became a permanent seat of the Government of Assam and remained as its capital.

== See also ==
- Ahom Kingdom
- Koch dynasty
- Beltola
- Ganeshguri
- Chandmari
- Guwahati
