= Adabari =

- Neighbourhood
- Location in Guwahati Location in Assam
- Coordinates: 26.159562°N 91.677835°E
- Country: India
- State: Assam
- District: Kamrup Metropolitan district
- City: Guwahati

Government
  - Body: GMC
- Time zone: UTC+5:30 (IST)
- PIN: 781 XXX
- Vehicle registration: AS-01
- Lok Sabha constituency: Gauhati
- Vidhan Sabha constituency: Gauhati West
- Planning agency: GMC
- Civic agency: GMC

Adabari is a locality in Guwahati.

== Geography ==
To the north and east of Adabari are Pandu and Kamakhya respectively; to its west is NH 27, and to its south lies Assam Trunk Road and the Kamakhya Junction railway station.

== Location ==
It is connected by air through the LGBI Airport, and by rail through Kamakhya Junction. Surrounded by the localities of Jalukbari and Maligaon, it is a busy commercial area of the city. The place directly connects to the NH 37. Adabari is major hub of transportation with regular vehicles plying to other districts of lower Assam from the bus depot.

Adabari Tiniali is a busy three point-junction in the locality. The roads meeting there are the Pandu Port Road (Pranabananda Sarani), Assam Trunk Road and the lane leading into Kamakhya Nagar.

== Amenities ==
It has four-wheeler showrooms of Maruti Suzuki (Bimal Auto Agency) and Hyundai (Saraighat Hyundai), and a two-wheeler showroom of Honda (Bimal Honda). The Grocer Supermarket is the major grocery departmental store in the area. Adding to the place is a memorial of late Bhupen Hazarika at the Jalukbari intersection, and NCS Square Mall, a shopping complex in the area, which hosts a PVR Inox screen among other retail outlets.

== See also ==
- Bhetapara
- Beltola
- Chandmari
- Paltan Bazaar
- Ganeshguri
