= Sarusajai =

Locality in Guwahati, India

Coordinates: 26°11′N 91°7′E

Sarusajai is a locality in the southern part of Guwahati, Assam, India. It is surrounded by Lalmati, Lokhra, Bhetapara, Hatigaon and Basistha and is near to National Highway 37. The multi-purpose Indira Gandhi Athletic Stadium is located here.

The mortal remains of Zuben Garg, one of the music icons of the state, were kept at the Arjun Bhogeswar Baruah Sports Complex for the public to pay their respects after he died in September 2025.

In June 2026, the locality got a Rs.500 crore fund from the Guwahati Metropolitan Development Authority for infrastructure development.

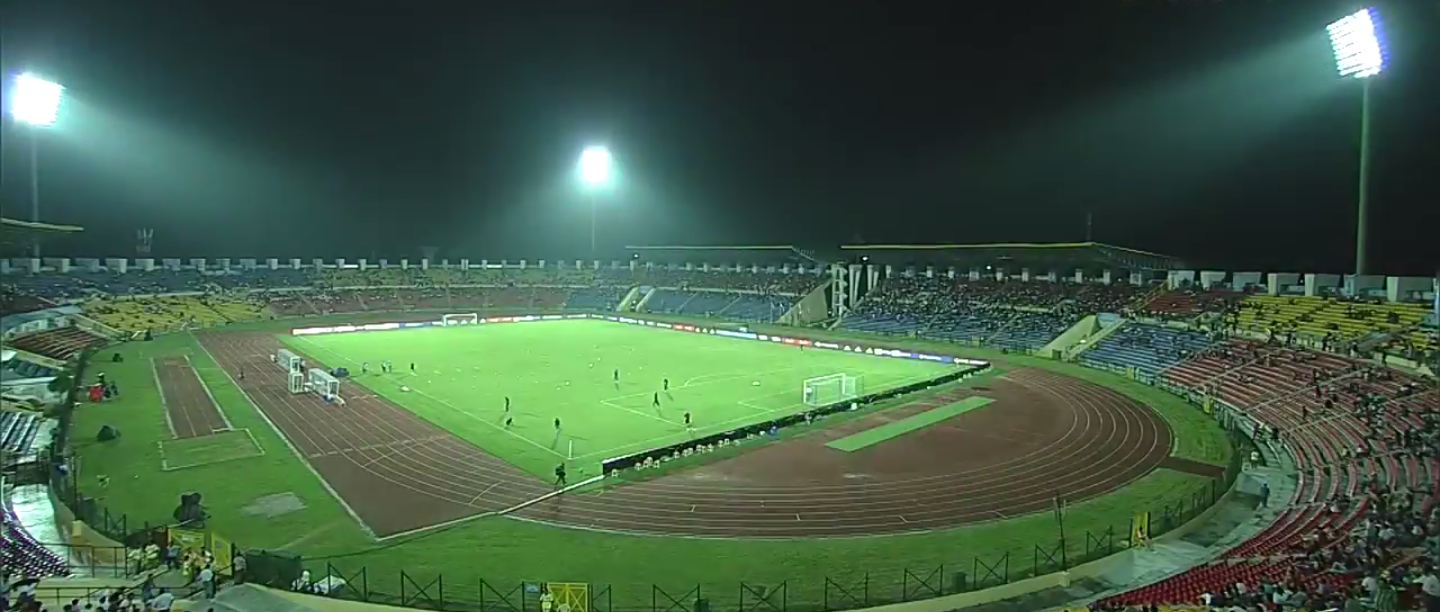
Indira Gandhi Athletic Stadium

== See also ==
- Pan Bazaar
- Paltan Bazaar
- Beltola
