= Ghoramara, Guwahati =

Coordinates: 26°11′N 91°7′E

Ghoramara is a locality in southern part of Guwahati, Assam, India, surrounded by Lalmati, Lokhra and Bhetapara localities. It is near National Highway 37.

== See also ==
- Pan Bazaar
- Paltan Bazaar
- Beltola
