= Silsako Lake =

Lake in Assam, India

- Location within Guwahati Location within Assam Location within India
- Location: Guwahati, Kamrup Metropolitan district, Assam, India
- Coordinates: 26°09′24.3″N 91°49′18.2″E

Silsako Lake (also known as Silsako Beel) is an urban wetland and lake located at the heart of the Guwahati city positioned between 26°10'08.47" N and 91°49'45.53" E. It is an elongated, linear-shaped beel surrounded by Amchang Wildlife Sanctuary to the east, with VIP Road and Chachal to the west, Narengi to the north, and Panjabari to the south. It is surrounded by villages like Satgaon, Hengrabari and Mathgharia in Kamrup Metropolitan district of Assam. Guwahati Water Bodies (Preservation and Conservation) Act 2008 has specifically notified the Silsako Lake in the Schedule I to IV along with six other wetlands of Guwahati.

== Etymology ==
Silsako (শিলসাঁকো) is the Assamese term for Stone Bridge. Beel (বিল) means lake in Assamese language.

== Area and ecosystem decline ==
Silsako lake has a length of approximately 5 km and an average width of 250 metres (820 ft).

In 1912, the total area of the beel was 1,758.47 hectares. Satellite-based analysis using the Normalized Difference Water Index (NDWI) documented a dramatic subsequent decline: the wetland area fell from 124.15 hectares in 2000 to 71.10 hectares in 2010, a loss of over 42% in a single decade. By 2020, the area had declined by a further 32.31 hectares. Field surveys additionally found that approximately 12 hectares of the wetland were under illegal occupation, with permanent residential and road structures built on what was formerly the water body.

Silsako Beel serves as a critical natural reservoir within the rapidly expanding city of Guwahati, absorbing monsoon rainfall and supporting complex aquatic food chains that sustain the urban ecosystem. The wetland's functions include flood mitigation, stormwater regulation, groundwater recharge, and provision of habitat for aquatic biodiversity.

Guwahati, located on the southern bank of the Brahmaputra River, is one of the fastest-growing cities in Northeast India, and the associated urban pressure has severely compromised these ecological functions. Urbanization impacts identified at Silsako Beel include shrinkage of the water body area, illegal encroachment, water pollution, waterlogging of surrounding areas, and reduction in aquatic flora and fauna.

Researchers at Gauhati University have used ArcGIS spatial analysis to document the changing land cover patterns and assess cumulative urbanization impacts. The study recommends interdisciplinary policy measures and stronger political will to implement sustainable management programmes.

== 2023 evictions ==
On 26 February 2023, GMDA through Pratidin Time informed that a major eviction drive would be carried out against encroached land belonging to Silsako lake after a few previous such attempts had failed.

The eviction drive started peacefully on 27 February 2023 and on the first day, illegally occupied land 100 metres (330 ft) away from the lake periphery, reclaimed upon former water channels, was acquired. Demolished structures included residential buildings, temples, namghars and mosques.

Following the initial evictions, many evictees complained of a lack of prior notice about the eviction, and many of the local residents including indigenous groups, claimed that their evicted land was legal and they even held GMC holding numbers. The drive was set to last until 3 March, and included relocation of many prominent establishments like the Ginger Hotel, OKD Institute of Social Change and Development and Doordarshan Kendra, Guwahati.

The drive was temporarily halted on 3 March. On 12 March, 179 acres of land were acquired from seventeen institutions to continue the eviction drive.

== See also ==
- List of lakes of Assam
- Wetlands in Indian cities
