= Borjhar =

Locality in Guwahati, India

Coordinates: 26°04′N 91°43′E

Borjhar is a locality in Guwahati, situated on the western fringes of the metropolitan expanse of the city. Jalukbari is 12 km to the east with nearest Railway station and junction at Azara and Kamakhya respectively.

== Education ==
Kendriya Vidyalaya Borjhar, St. Claret High School, Miles Bronson Residential School are some of the schools located in the area. Guwahati College of Architecture is also located here.

== Transport ==
Lokpriya Gopinath Bordoloi International Airport is located here and is well connected with the rest of the city with A/C airport service buses and cabs.

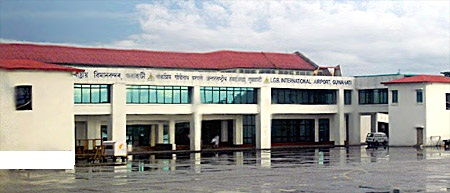
Borjhar Airport

== See also ==
- Basistha
- Beltola
- Bhetapara
