= Fancy Bazaar =

Locality in Assam, India

- Suburb
- Interactive map of Fancy Bazaar
- Coordinates: 26°10′56″N 91°44′27″E
- Country: India
- State: Assam
- Region: Western Assam
- District: Kamrup Metropolitan

Area
  - Total: 2.53 km^{2} (0.98 sq mi)

Dimensions
  - Length: 2.19 km (1.36 mi)
  - Width: 1.90 km (1.18 mi)
- Time zone: UTC+5:30 (IST)
- Area code: 781028
- Vehicle registration: AS - 01
- Website: gmc.assam.gov.in

Fancy Bazaar is a locality in Guwahati, surrounded by localities of Pan Bazaar, Lakhtokia with nearest airport at Borjhar and Railway Station at Paltan Bazaar. It is known as the business hub of Northeast region. It derives its name from the Jail and gallows for hanging (phansi) that was situated in this area—the municipal records still calls it Phansi bazaar.

== History ==
Fancy Bazaar served as the residence of Borphukan. The Borphukan's council was similar to the council-hall (Bor-Chora) at the capital and consisted of six Phukans collectively called the Guwahatiya or Dopdariya Phukan.

== Commercial viability ==
Fancy Bazaar is busy commercial area as central location of various commercial enterprises.

== See also ==
- Ulubari
- Lokhra
- Jalukbari

== Sources ==
- Baruah, Swarna Lata (1993). Last Days of Ahom Monarchy: A History of Assam from 1769 to 1826. Munshiram Manoharlal Publishers Pvt. Limited. ISBN 978-81-215-0462-1.
