= Athgaon =

- Neighbourhood
- Location in Guwahati Location in Assam
- Coordinates: 26.172620°N 91.738896°E
- Country: India
- State: Assam
- District: Kamrup Metropolitan district
- City: Guwahati

Government
  - Body: GMC
- Time zone: UTC+5:30 (IST)
- PIN: 781 XXX
- Vehicle registration: AS-01
- Lok Sabha constituency: Gauhati
- Vidhan Sabha constituency: Gauhati East
- Planning agency: GMC
- Civic agency: GMC

Athgaon (Assamese pronunciation: [atʰgɑ̃ʊ]) is a locality in the western part of Guwahati, Assam, India.

== Geography ==
Athgaon is bounded to the north by Assam Trunk Road to its west and east by Kumarpara and Chatribari respectively, and to its south by the Bharalu river. The Guwahati Kabarsthan is situated in the southeast of Athgaon, and K.C. Das Commerce College is situated in its east.

== Location ==
The nearest railway station is the Guwahati railway station through the Paltan Bazaar entrance, and the nearest airport is the LGBI Airport.

It is an important commercial area within the city and large business houses are set up here. Due to its central location, it is accessible from all parts of city with regular city buses and other modes of transportation.

== See also ==
- Bhangagarh
- Ganeshguri
- Pan Bazaar
