= Ambari =

- Neighbourhood
- Location in Guwahati Location in Assam
- Coordinates: 26.184074°N 91.752909°E
- Country: India
- State: Assam
- District: Kamrup Metropolitan district
- City: Guwahati

Government
  - Body: GMC
- Time zone: UTC+5:30 (IST)
- PIN: 781 XXX
- Vehicle registration: AS-01
- Lok Sabha constituency: Gauhati
- Vidhan Sabha constituency: Gauhati East
- Planning agency: GMC
- Civic agency: GMC

Ambari (Assamese pronunciation: [ambaɹi]) is a locality in Guwahati, India.

Located in northern Guwahati, it is a site for important archaeological excavations related to ancient Assam.

At the southern end of the neighbourhood lies the Guwahati railway station. Some important buildings located here are the Guwahati Press Club, Asom Gana Parishad office, Gauhati University City Office, Assam State Museum, District Library and Rabindra Bhawan.

== See also ==
- Bhetapara
- Beltola
- Chandmari
- Ganeshguri
