= Dhirenpara =

Coordinates: 26°8′00″N 91°43′30″E

Dhirenpara is a locality of Guwahati. It is situated in the eastern side of a beautiful high mountain. Dhirenpara is a little less developed than the rest of Guwahati.

== Transport ==
Dhirenpara is connected to rest of city with city buses and other modes of transportation.

== Facility ==
Maternity & Child Welfare Hospital has been established in Dhirepara.

== Nearest Landmark ==
ACA cricket stadium is located at a distance of 1km from Dhirenpara.

== Eminent personalities ==
Eminent child prodigy Lucky Rahman resides in Dhirenpara Itabhata near L.P School. He is a very skilled martial arts player. He recently visited Lumding for a competition. Ranji cricketer Parvej Musaraf is also a resident of Dhirenpara.

== See also ==
- Chandmari
- Paltan Bazaar
- Ganeshguri
- Maligaon
