= Panjabari =

Place in Assam, India

Panjabari (Assamese: পাঞ্জাবাৰী) is a locality in Guwahati, Assam, India.

Located in the south eastern part of Guwahati, it is surrounded by hills, except the northern and western sides. It is surrounded by the localities of Khanapara, Sixmile, Bormotoria, Borbari and Narengi. It is 10 kilometres (6.2 mi) and 29 kilometres (18 mi) away from Guwahati Railway Station and Lokpriya Gopinath Bordoloi International Airport, respectively. It preserves its natural scenery, though it is going towards deforestation due to population pressure.

== Etymology ==
The word Panjabari has been derived from two words, i.e., 'Panja' which is referred to as the 'Footprint of Tigers', indicating the presence of Tigers in the region during the past times, and, 'Bari' meaning 'Backyard'.

Also, the locality of Panjabari has a place named Bagharbari, i.e., 'Bagh' meaning 'Tiger' and 'Bari' meaning 'Backyard', which translates to "Tiger's Backyard", which again indicates the presence of Tigers in the region during the past times.

== Places of Interest ==
- Srimanta Sankardev Kalakshetra
- Shilpgram NEZCC
- Bipanan Khetra
- Batahghuli Bazar
- Panjabari Durga Mandir
- Batahghuli Shani Mandir
- Batahghuli Ganesh Mandir

== Offices ==
- Assam Information Commission
- Assam State Film (Finance and Development) Corporation Ltd.
- CBSE Regional Office
- Office Of The Commissioner, Panchayat & Rural Development Department
- Purabi Dairy (West Assam Milk Producers' Co-operative Union Ltd.)
- Assam State Rural Livelihood Mission

== See also ==
- Bhetapara
- Beltola
- Chandmari
- Ganeshguri
