= Atal Udyan =

Urban park in Guwahati, India

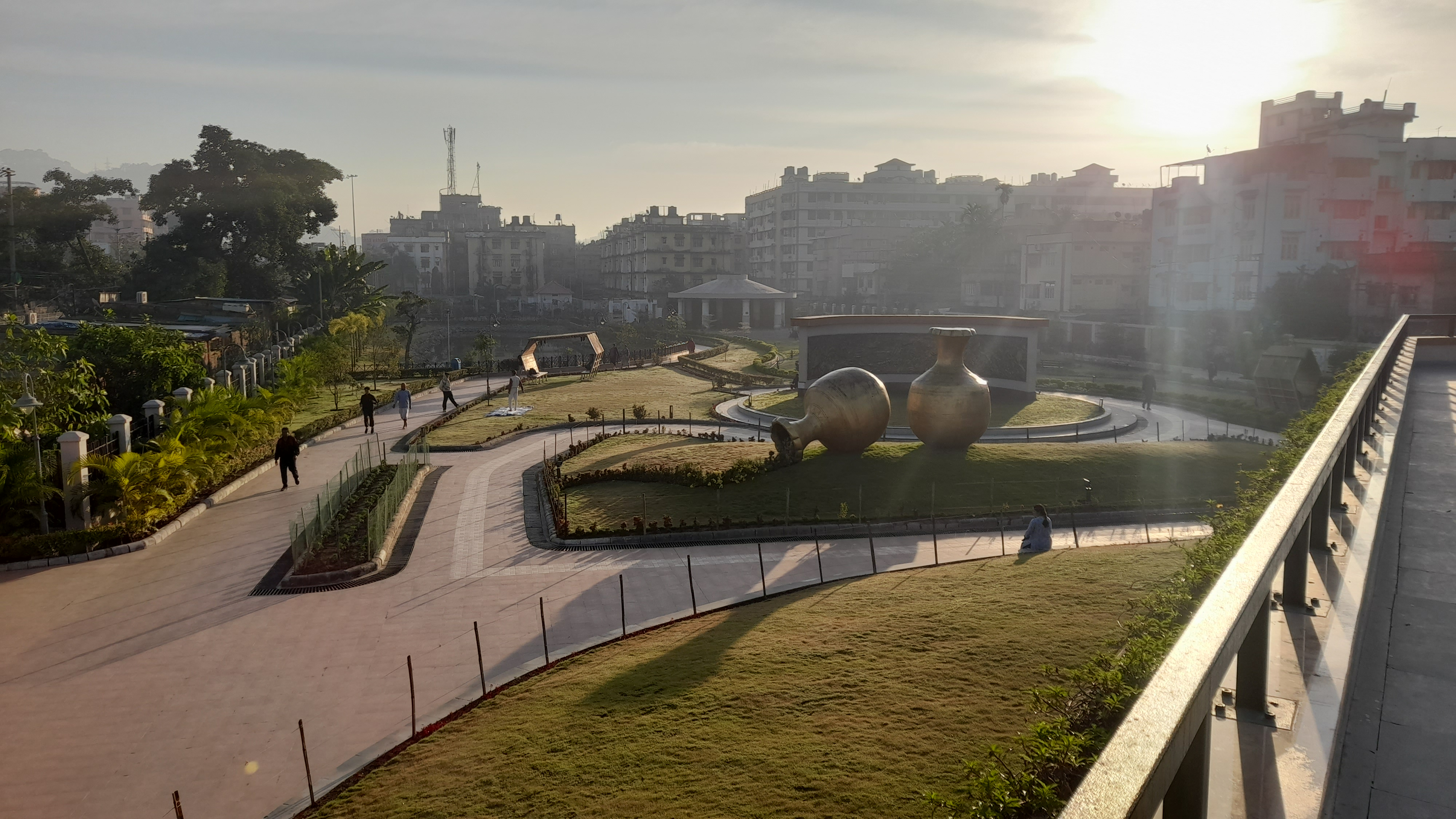
- Park viewed from the amphitheatre
- Interactive map of Atal Udyan
- Type: Public park
- Location: Adabari Tiniali in Guwahati, Assam, India
- Coordinates: 26°09′29″N 91°41′12″E
- Area: 2.6 acres (1.1 ha)
- Created: 24 December 2021
- Operator: GMDA
- Open: Tuesday to Sunday, 11:00 AM to 8:00 PM
- Status: Open

Atal Udyan (Assamese pronunciation: [ɔtɔl uˈdjan]) is an urban park situated at Adabari Tiniali in the Maligaon area of Guwahati, India.

== History ==
The project was undertaken by Guwahati Metropolitan Development Authority in late 2017 as a part of its beautification program for the city. Atal Udyan was to be constructed on land acquired from Assam State Housing Board. It was constructed at a cost of ₹8.74 crore (US$910,000), spread over an area of 8 bighas (2.6 acres).

The park was inaugurated by Chief Minister Himanta Biswa Sarma on 24 December 2021, a day before the 97th birth anniversary of former Prime Minister of India, late Atal Bihari Vajpayee.

== Features ==
The park boasts the following features:

- Amphitheatre with a capacity of 250 spectators
- Meditation hall
- Kiosks for resting
- Open-air gymnasium
- Children's playground
- Fountain
- Japanese garden
- Scrap waste sculpture court
- Shrine of Shiva
