= Khanapara =

Place in Assam, India

- Suburb
- Interactive map of Khanapara
- Coordinates: 26°07′30″N 91°48′39″E
- Country: India
- State: Assam
- Region: Western Assam
- District: Kamrup Metropolitan

Area
  - Total: 2.53 km^{2} (0.98 sq mi)

Dimensions
  - Length: 2.19 km (1.36 mi)
  - Width: 1.90 km (1.18 mi)
- Time zone: UTC+5:30 (IST)
- Area code: 781028
- Vehicle registration: AS - 01
- Website: gmc.assam.gov.in

Khanapara is a locality in Guwahati, Assam, India. Located in extreme south of Guwahati, it is hub for regional transportation. The Assam Public Service Commission, Assam Administrative Staff College, The College of Veterinary Science is located here with other offices of Veterinary department of Assam. Ganesh Mandir Indoor Stadium and Regional Science Centre are located here. This locality is also famous for the game of teer, played by people all over the Assam and Meghalaya.

== See also ==
- Bhetapara
- Beltola
- Chandmari
- Ganeshguri
- Lokhra
