= Kahilipara =

Locality in Guwahati, Assam, India

Kahilipara (Assamese: কাহিলীপাৰা) is a locality in Guwahati, Assam, India. The nearest airport is at Guwahati Airport and railway station at Paltan Bazaar. Surrounded by localities of Ganeshguri and Lalganesh, it is a residential area. Most educational department offices of state government are located here. Some of the important offices are

- Directorate of Public Instruction (the educational department from primary school to higher education)
- State Council for Technical Education
- Special Branch Assam Police
- Government BDS Deaf and Dumb School
- Axom Sarba Sikha Abhiyan Mission Office
- State Forensic Laboratory
- Jyoti Chitraban film studio
- 10th Assam Police Battalion
- 4th Assam Police battalion
- 133KV grid sub station AGCL
- National Power Training Institute
- Modern English School
- MES-Dipankar’s Badminton Academy

== See also ==
- Bhetapara
- Chandmari
