= Lalmati =

Coordinates: 26°11′N 91°7′E

Lalmati is a locality in southern part of Guwahati surrounded by Jalukbari Lokhra and Basistha localities. It is near National Highway 27.

There is a health sub centre, Ayushman Arogya Mandir in the village.

== See also ==
- Pan Bazaar
- Paltan Bazaar
- Beltola
