= Birubari =

Locality of Guwahati, Assam, India

Coordinates: 26°9′36″N 91°45′15″E

Birubari is a locality of Guwahati, Assam, India. It is surrounded by localities of Rupnagar and Bhangagarh.

== See also ==
- Ganeshguri
- Paltan Bazaar
