= Ulubari =

Locality in Assam, India

- Suburb
- Interactive map of Ulubari
- Coordinates: 26°10′30″N 91°45′28″E
- Country: India
- State: Assam
- Region: Western Assam
- District: Kamrup Metropolitan

Area
  - Total: 2.53 km^{2} (0.98 sq mi)

Dimensions
  - Length: 2.19 km (1.36 mi)
  - Width: 1.90 km (1.18 mi)
- Time zone: UTC+5:30 (IST)
- Area code: 781028
- Vehicle registration: AS - 01
- Website: gmc.assam.gov.in

Ulubari is a locality in center of Guwahati, Assam, India, surrounded by localities of Bhangagarh and Paltan Bazaar.

== Sports facilities ==
The multipurpose Nehru Stadium is located here which hosts international cricket and football matches.

== Gallery ==
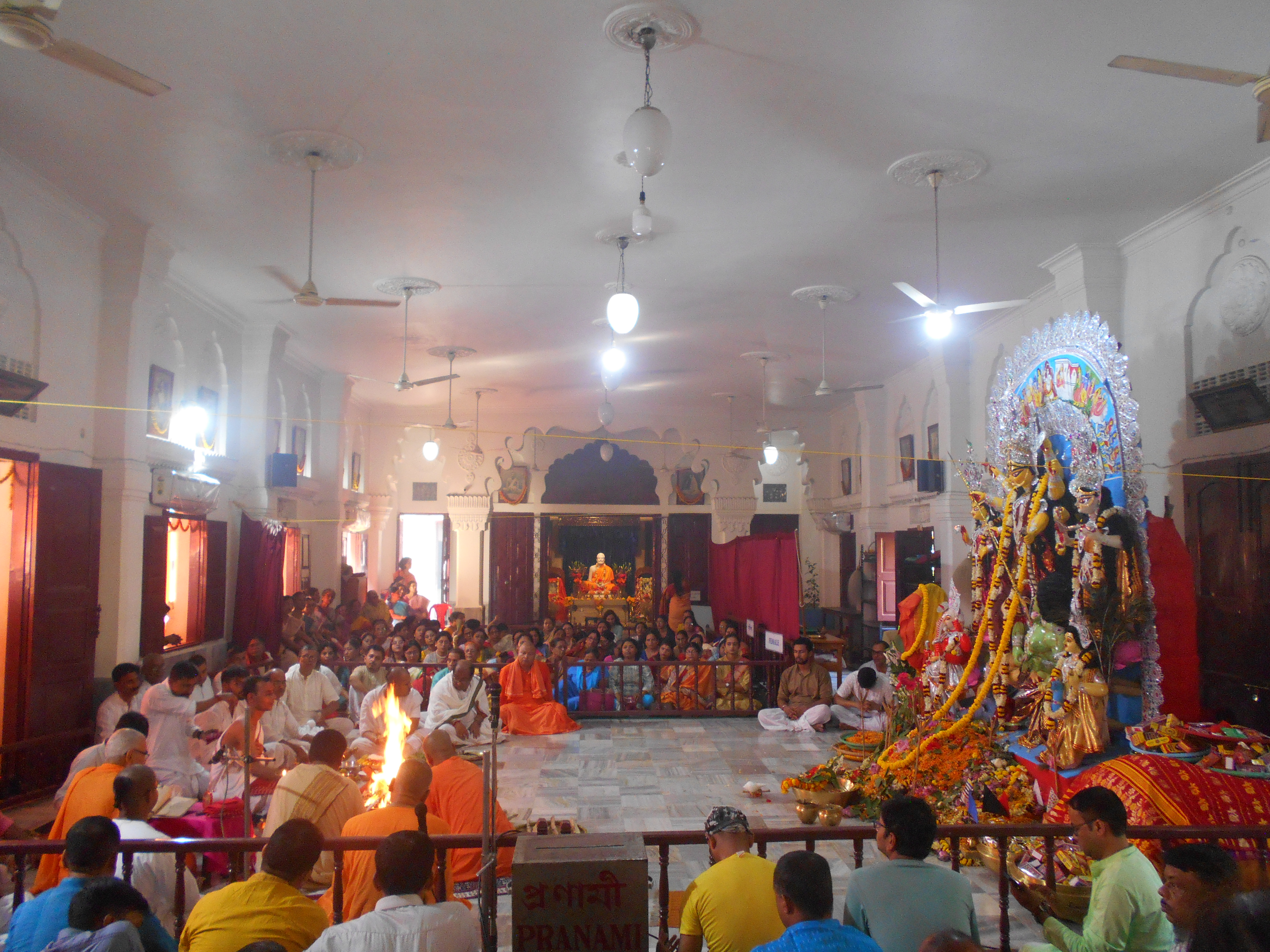
Durga Puja celebrations on Navami at Ramakrishna Mission Ulubari (2023)

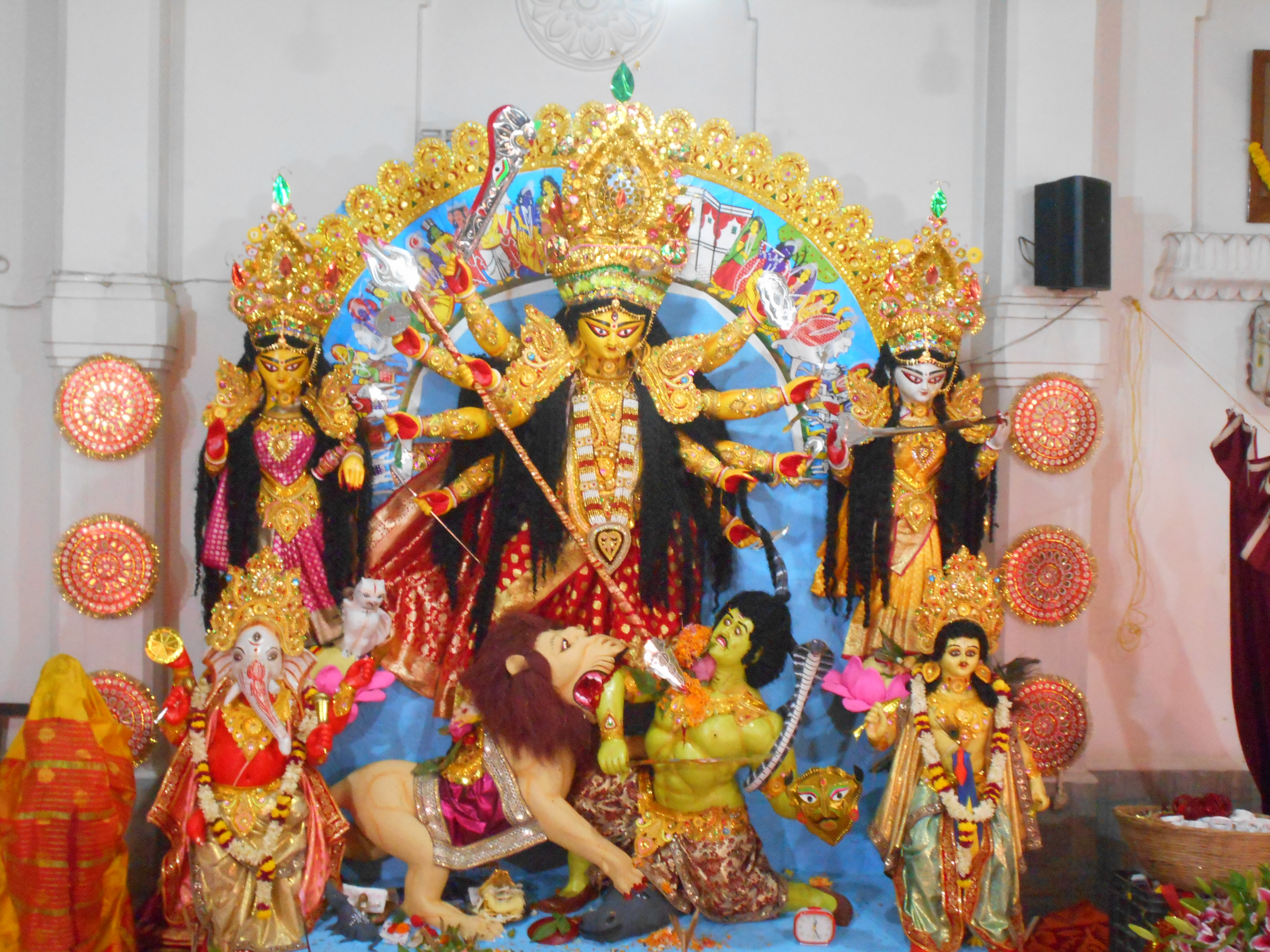
Durga idol at Ramakrishna Mission Ulubari (2024)

== See also ==
- Basistha
- Beltola
- Chandmari
