= Rupnagar, Guwahati =

Coordinates: 26°9′30″N 91°45′35″E

Rupnagar is a locality of Guwahati, a city in Northeast India in the state Assam. It is surrounded by the localities of Bhangagarh and Birubari.It was known as Kalapahar number two earlier. It is named after Late Rupnath Brahma, one of the architects of modern Assam and long serving minister in the Assam Government.

== Geography ==
Rupnagar is located next to the city center of Bhangagarh where the Guwahati Medical College is located. It is well connected to the rest of the city by different means of transportation.

== See also ==
- Bhetapara
- Rehabari

There is also a Rupnagar in Punjab (India), which is currently called as Ropar.
