= Bhangagarh =

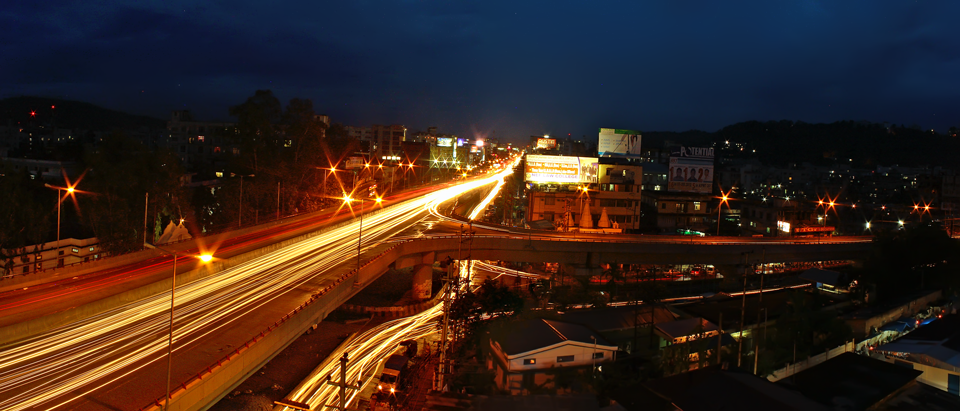
- Bhangagarh, Guwahati in 2012
- Interactive map of Bhangagarh
- Coordinates: 26°09′46″N 91°46′11″E
- Country: India
- State: Assam
- Region: Western Assam
- District: Kamrup Metropolitan

Area
  - Total: 2.53 km^{2} (0.98 sq mi)

Dimensions
  - Length: 2.19 km (1.36 mi)
  - Width: 1.90 km (1.18 mi)
- Time zone: UTC+5:30 (IST)
- Area code: 781028
- Vehicle registration: AS - 01
- Website: gmc.assam.gov.in

Bhangagarh is a locality in Guwahati, Assam, India. It is surrounded by the localities of Paltan Bazaar, Chandmari and Ganeshguri. The nearest airport at Borjhar and the nearest railway station is that of Guwahati at Paltan Bazaar.

== Health facilities ==
Various government and private hospitals are located here like Gauhati Medical College and Hospital, Regional Dental College and Hospital, and Nemcare Hospital to name a few.

== See also ==
- Basistha
- Bhetapara
- Beltola
- Jalukbari
