= Satgaon, Guwahati =

Locality in Assam

Coordinates: 26°15′N 91°8′E

Satgaon is a locality in eastern part of Guwahati surrounded by localities of Narengi, Noonmati and Patharquarry. Located in south east of city, it is thinly populated and less industrialised.

== Education ==
Saint Francis de sales school, Kendriya Vidyalaya Narengi, Army School Narengi and Kendriya Vidyalaya Noonmaati are few nearby schools.

== Other institutes ==
Satgaon Army Halt Station is located here.

== Transport ==
It is well connected to rest of city with city buses and other private commercial vehicles.

== See also ==
- Jalukbari
- Gandhinagar
