= Hatigaon =

Coordinates: 26°12′N 91°7′E

Hatigaon is a locality in the southern part of Guwahati, Assam, India. It is surrounded by the localities of Ganeshguri, Bhetapara, Sijubari and Survey. It is 8 kilometres (5.0 mi) and 25 kilometres (16 mi) away from Guwahati Railway Station and Lokpriya Gopinath Bordoloi International Airport, respectively. It is one of the best residential place in Guwahati having great transport connectivity.

== Etymology ==
It derives its name from Kamrupi, "Hati" (row) and "Gaon" which translates to rows and village, that is "row of villages".

== History ==
Hatigaon is the place where the elephants of the Beltola Koch Royal family were kept and trained literally meaning village of elephants (in Assamese Hati means elephant; gaon means village)

== Health facilities ==
Global Hospital of Surgery, HM Hospital and Medicity Guwahati are some of the prominent healthcare centres located here.

== See also ==
- Pan Bazaar
- Narengi
