= Football at the 2016 South Asian Games – Men's tournament =

2016 South Asian Games
Tournament details
- Host country: India
- Teams: 6 (from 1 confederation)
- Venues: 2 (in 1 host city)

Final positions
- Champions: Nepal (3rd title)
- Runners-up: India
- Third place: Bangladesh

Tournament statistics
- Matches played: 10
- Goals scored: 39 (3.9 per match)
- Top scorer: (Nepal) Nawayug Shrestha (7 Goals)
- Best player: (Nepal) Nawayug Shrestha

Men's Football at the 2016 South Asian Games was held in Guwahati, India from 6 February – 15 February 2016.

== Fixtures and results ==
Accurate as of 15 February 2016.

=== Group A ===
Pos	Team	Pld	W	D	L	GF	GA	GD	Pts	Qualification
1	Maldives	2	1	0	1	5	4	+1	3	Advance to Semi finals
2	India	2	1	0	1	3	3	0	3	Advance to Semi finals
3	Sri Lanka	2	1	0	1	2	3	−1	3	

Source: Futbo24
Rules for classification: 1) points; 2) goal difference; 3) goals scored; 4) head-to-head result.
6 February 2016
14:00

India	0–1	Sri Lanka
	Report	Rifnas 12'

SAI Centre, Paltan Bazaar
Attendance: 8000

8 February 2016
14:00

Maldives	3–1	Sri Lanka
Nashid 10'; Ansar 28', 58'	Report	Rifnas 61'

SAI Centre, Paltan Bazaar

10 February 2016
14:00

India	3–2	Maldives
Udanta 4', 59'; Kotal 11'	Report	Adnan 9'; Kotal 42' (o.g.)

SAI Centre, Paltan Bazaar

=== Group B ===
Pos	Team	Pld	W	D	L	GF	GA	GD	Pts	Qualification
1	Bangladesh	2	1	1	0	3	2	+1	4	Advance to Semi finals
2	Nepal	2	1	0	1	6	2	+4	3	Advance to Semi finals
3	Bhutan	2	0	1	1	1	6	−5	1	

Source: Futbol24
Rules for classification: 1) points; 2) goal difference; 3) goals scored; 4) head-to-head result.
7 February 2016
14:00

Bhutan	0–5	Nepal
	Report	Shrestha 33', 75', 85'; Bishal 44'; Bista 51'

SAI Centre, Paltan Bazaar
Attendance: 195

9 February 2016
14:00

Bangladesh	1–1	Bhutan
Jibon 42'		Dorji 19'

SAI Centre, Paltan Bazaar

11 February 2016
14:00

Bangladesh	2–1	Nepal
Jibon 45'; Raihan 42'		Tamang 3'

SAI Centre, Paltan Bazaar

=== Knockout round ===
Semifinals
13 February – Sarusajai
Maldives	3
Nepal	4
13 February – Sarusajai
India	3
Bangladesh	0

Gold medal match
15 February – Sarusajai
Nepal	2
India	1
Bronze medal match
15 February – Sarusajai
Maldives	2 (4)
Bangladesh (p)	2 (5)

==== Semi finals ====
13 February 2016
14:00

Bangladesh	0–3	India
		Udanta 22'; Jerry 39'; Rane 63'

Indira Gandhi Athletic Stadium, Sarusajai

13 February 2016
19:00

Maldives	3–4 (a.e.t.)	Nepal
Hamza 52'; Nashid 86'; Naiz 115'		Bista 15'; Shrestha 36', 120', 122'

Indira Gandhi Athletic Stadium, Sarusajai

=== Bronze medal match ===
15 February 2016
14:00

Maldives	2–2	Bangladesh
Fasir 37', 66'	Report	Jibon 11'; Sohel 17'
Penalties
Wisam (penalty scored); Hamza (penalty scored); Fasir (penalty scored); Sammam (penalty scored); Easa (penalty missed)	4–5	Fahad (penalty scored); Jony (penalty scored); Rubel (penalty scored); Yeasin (penalty scored); Raihan (penalty scored)

Indira Gandhi Athletic Stadium, Sarusajai

=== Gold medal match ===
15 February 2016
19:00 IST

Nepal	2–1	India
Budhathoki 65'; Shrestha 70'		Narzary 30' (pen.)

Indira Gandhi Athletic Stadium, Sarusajai
Attendance: 11,220

== Winner ==
Football at the 2016 South Asian Games

Nepal
Third title

== Goalscorers ==
7 Goals

- (Nepal) Nawayug Shrestha

3 Goals

- (India) Udanta Singh
- (Bangladesh) Nabib Newaj Jibon

2 Goals

- (Maldives) Ansar Ibrahim
- (Sri Lanka) Mohamed Rifnas
- (Nepal) Anjan Bista
- (Maldives) Ahmed Nashid
- (Maldives) Ali Fasir

1 Goal

- (Bangladesh) Raihan Hasan
- (Bangladesh) Sohel Rana
- (Bhutan) Jigme Dorji
- (India) Pritam Kotal
- (India) Jerry Mawihmingthanga
- (India) Jayesh Rane
- (India) Halicharan Narzary
- (Nepal) Ananta Tamang
- (Nepal) Prakash Budhathoki
- (Nepal) Bishal Rai
- (Maldives) Muruthala Adnan
- (Maldives) Mohamad Hamza
- (Maldives) Hasan Naiz

Own Goal

- (India) Pritam Kotal (playing against (Maldives) )

== See also ==
- Football at the 2016 South Asian Games – Women's tournament
