= Kamakhya, Guwahati =

Locality in Guwahati, Assam, India

Kamakhya
- Suburb
- Interactive map of Kamakhya
- Coordinates: 26°09′59″N 91°42′23″E
- Country: India
- State: Assam
- Region: Western Assam
- District: Kamrup Metropolitan

Area
  - Total: 2.53 km^{2} (0.98 sq mi)

Dimensions
  - Length: 2.19 km (1.36 mi)
  - Width: 1.90 km (1.18 mi)
- Time zone: UTC+5:30 (IST)
- Area code: 781028
- Vehicle registration: AS - 01
- Website: gmc.assam.gov.in

Kamakhya is a locality in Guwahati, Assam, which is 20 kilometres (12 mi) from the Guwahati Airport and about 6 km from Guwahati Railway Station, it also has own railway junction called Kamakhya Junction.

Kamakhya is known for presence of ancient Kamakhya Temple in Nilachal pahar or hill. Ambubachi Mela held here annually attracts pilgrimage from other parts of country as well as from abroad. In February 2012, this area came into limelight with the discovery of rock cut caves built during the reign of Kamarupa king Mahendra Varman.

== See also ==
- Black art
- Beltola
- Bhetapara
- Chandmari
- Ganeshguri
- Paltan Bazaar
