= Raihan Hasan =

Bangladeshi footballer

Personal information
- Full name: Mohammed Raihan Hasan
- Date of birth: 10 September 1994 (age 32)
- Place of birth: Tangail, Bangladesh
- Height: 1.78 m (5 ft 10 in)
- Positions: Centre-back; right-back

Senior career*
Years	Team	Apps	(Gls)
2012–2016	Sheikh Jamal	?	(1)
2016	Chittagong Abahani	22	(1)
2017–2021	Dhaka Abahani	65	(0)
2021–2023	Sheikh Jamal	42	(0)
2023–2024	Chittagong Abahani	18	(1)
2024–2025	Rahmatganj	9	(0)

International career^{‡}
2014–2016	Bangladesh U23	7	(1)
2013–2022	Bangladesh	34	(0)
Medal record
Representing Bangladesh
South Asian Games
Bronze medal – third place	2016
- * Club domestic league appearances and goals as of 27 May 2025 ‡ National team caps and goals as of 14 June 2022

Raihan Hasan (Bengali: রায়হান হাসান) is a retired Bangladeshi professional footballer who played as a defender. He last played for Bangladesh Premier League club Rahmatganj MFS. He is known for releasing long throw-ins into the opponent's box.

== Club career ==
=== Sheikh Jamal Dhanmondi Club ===
Raihan started his top-flight career with Dhanmondi giant Sheikh Jamal Dhanmondi Club. After finishing as runners up in the league in 2012, during his debut season, Raihan helped the club win both Bangladesh Premier League and Federation Cup titles in the following year. He won the double once again in 2014.

=== Chittagong Abahani Limited ===
In 2016, Raihan made a move to Chittagong Abahani after spending five years with the Dhanmondi club. His first goal in the league for his new club came on 14 August 2016, in a 6–1 victory against Uttar Baridhara Club.

=== Abahani Limited Dhaka ===
On 1 January 2017, Raihan Joined Bangladeshi giants Abahani Limited Dhaka. During his four-year spell at the club Raihan won the Bangladesh Premier League title in his debut season, and also won the Federation Cup trophy on two occasions. He was also part of the Abahani team that reached the knockout phase of the 2019 AFC Cup. During his last season at the club, Raihan registered 6 assists, all through his long throw-ins.

=== Return to Sheikh Jamal Dhanmondi Club ===
On 21 October 2021, Raihan returned to Sheikh Jamal Dhanmondi Club, after spending the previous four seasons with Abahani. Upon returning to the club, coach Juan Manuel Martínez Sáez converted Raihan into a centre back.

== International career ==
=== Youth ===
Raihan has represented Bangladesh by playing for the Bangladesh under-23 team. On 15 September 2014, he made his international debut for Bangladesh under-23 team in the match against Afghanistan in 2014 Asian Games. He scored his first goal for the under-23 side against Nepal during the 2016 South Asian Games.

=== Senior ===
On 7 March 2013, at the age of 18, Raihan made his international debut for Bangladesh during a friendly match against the Northern Mariana Islands. In the 85th minute of the match, he entered the field as a substitute for Mithun Chowdhury. Bangladesh won the match 4–0.

== Career statistics ==
=== International ===
As of 14 June 2022.

Bangladesh
Year	Apps	Goals
2013	4	0
2014	3	0
2015	10	0
2016	8	0
2019	4	0
2020	2	0
2022	3	0
Total	34	0

=== International goals ===
==== Olympic Team ====
#	Date	Venue	Opponent	Score	Result	Competition
1.	11 February 2016	SAI Centre, Paltan Bazaar	Nepal U23	2–0	2–0	2016 South Asian Games

== Honours ==
Sheikh Jamal Dhanmondi Club

- Bangladesh Premier League: 2013–14, 2014–15
- Federation Cup: 2013–14

Abahani Limited Dhaka

- Bangladesh Premier League: 2017–18
- Federation Cup: 2017, 2018

Chittagong Abahani Limited

- Independence Cup: 2016

Bangladesh U23

- South Asian Games bronze medal: 2016
