= Nalapara =

Coordinates: 26°6′54″N 91°45′35″E

Nalapara is a locality of Guwahati, situated in southern part of city.

== Transport ==
It is connected to rest of the city with city buses and other modes of transportation.

== See also ==
- Patharquerry
- Odalbakra
