= Bonda, Guwahati =

Coordinates: 26°22′00″N 91°6′30″E

Bonda is a locality of Guwahati surrounded by the locality of Narengi, India.

== Transportation ==
Bonda is connected to the rest of the city via the bus lines and other modes of transportation.
