= Gandhinagar, Guwahati =

Coordinates: 26.16°N 91.83°E

Gandhinagar is a locality in Guwahati. Located in east of the city, it is sparsely populated. It is surrounded by the localities of Satgaon and Narengi.

== See also ==
- Narengi
- Satgaon
