= Guwahati Metro =

Rapid transit system in Guwahati, India

Guwahati Metro গুৱাহাটী মেট্ৰ'

Overview
- Owner: GMDA
- Locale: Guwahati, Assam, India
- Transit type: Rapid Transit
- Number of lines: 4 (Phase 1)
- Number of stations: 54
- Headquarters: Guwahati

Operation
- Train length: 3 coaches

Technical
- System length: 61.4 kilometres (38.2 mi) (Planned)

The Guwahati Metro is a rapid transit proposed for the city of Guwahati, Assam, India. The system plan consists of 4 corridors covering a distance of 61.42 km in phase one of the Guwahati Metro.

== History ==
On 11 January 2013, former Chief Minister of Assam Tarun Gogoi held discussions with officials of Guwahati Development Department and Guwahati Metropolitan Development Authority, in which after detailed deliberations it was agreed that there was a need of urgently taking up the study of introducing a metro rail and bus rapid transit system in the city to arrest the chaotic traffic condition on the streets. The Assamese daily "Dainik Agradoot" published an article on 19 June 2012 regarding the probable metro rail of Guwahati.

== Feasibility study ==
The survey of the proposed project included preliminary exercises such as a study of the number of commuters in different areas of the city at different times of the day and a calculation of the estimated cost of the project. The survey conducted a track type feasibility study at different places. Three types were considered: underground track, overground track, and elevated track. The Khanapara – Jalukbari route was proposed to have overground and elevated tracks because this route is not congested. The other two routes were to have a combination of underground and elevated tracks. The contract to make a feasibility report and to prepare a detailed project report was awarded to M/S Rites in June 2014. However, it was suggested that elevated tracks will be most viable in Guwahati because they are cheaper and can boost tourism potentiality.

== Route ==
Four corridors have been planned by Guwahati Metropolitan Development Authority under the first phase of Guwahati Metro.

Line	First operational	Last extension	Stations	Length (km)	Terminals		Rolling stock	Track gauge (mm)	Power
Line 1			22	26.6	Dharapur	Narangi		1435 mm standard gauge	
Line 2			10	10	M G Road	Khanapara		1435 mm standard gauge	
Line 3			14	19.4	Jalukbari	Khanapara		1435 mm standard gauge	
Line 4			8	9.4	ISBT	Paltan Bazar		1435 mm standard gauge	
Total			54	61.4					

== See also ==
- Guwahati railway station
- Guwahati Metropolitan Development Authority
- List of metro systems
- List of metro systems in India
