= Patharquerry =

Coordinates: 26°8′49″N 91°44′8″E

Patharquerry is a locality in Guwahati, surrounded by Lokhra and Barsapara localities. Situated in northeastern part of the city, this area is residential with a small commercial infrastructure.

== Transport ==
The locality is well connected to rest of the city with city buses and other modes of transportation.

== See also ==
- Paltan Bazaar
- Rehabari
