= Odalbakra =

Coordinates: 26°8′25″N 91°45′6″E

Odalbakra is a locality of Guwahati, situated in the northeastern part of the city. The place is inhabited by many indigenous tribal communities like Rabha, Deori, Mishing and Bodo. Hayat Hospital is located here and it is one of the most advanced hospital in the North East. Government school Sabitri Bharali High School is located here. Also many private schools are here like Modern English School, Little Bird Academy etc.

== Transport ==
It is connected to the rest of the city with city buses and other modes of transportation, which includes Tata Magic and 24×7 Ola Service, Uber service.

== See also ==
- Nalapara
- Rehabari
