= Chariali =

Chariali or Charali may refer to:

- Baihata Chariali or Baihata, a town in Assam, India
- Biswanath Chariali or Biswanath, a city in Assam, India
- Maligaon Chariali, a location in Guwahati, Assam, India
- Çərəli or Charali, a village in Place in Qubadli, Azerbaijan
- Charali (Nepal), a neighbourhood in the municipality of Mechinagar Municipality, Koshi, Nepal
