= Betkuchi =

Locality in Guwahati, Assam, India

Coordinates: 26.11°N 91.70°E

Betkuchi is the locality in Guwahati, Assam, India; surrounded by the localities of Jyotikuchi, Lokhra and Garchuk.

== See also ==
- Bhangagarh
- Jyotikuchi
