= Lokhra =

Locality in Assam, India

Coordinates: 26°11′N 91°7′E

Lokhra, also known as Lakhra, is a locality in southern part of Guwahati in Assam. It is surrounded by Jalukbari, Lalmati and Basistha localities. It is near National Highway 37 and is 9 km and 18 km from Guwahati Railway Station and Airport, respectively.

Schools

Lokhra locality comprises some of the best schools of Guwahati such as Delhi Public School Guwahati (CBSE), GEMS NPS (CBSE) and Sanskriti Gurukul (ICSE).

== See also ==
- Betkuchi
- Ganeshguri
- Narengi
- Bhetapara
