= Basistha =

- Neighbourhood
- Location in Guwahati Location in Assam
- Coordinates: 26°6′7.711″N 91°47′33.551″E
- Country: India
- State: Assam
- District: Kamrup Metropolitan district
- City: Guwahati

Government
  - Body: GMC
- Time zone: UTC+5:30 (IST)
- PIN: 781 XXX
- Vehicle registration: AS-01
- Lok Sabha constituency: Gauhati
- Vidhan Sabha constituency: Gauhati East
- Planning agency: GMC
- Civic agency: GMC

Basistha (Assamese pronunciation: [bɔxistʰɔ]) is a locality situated in the south of Guwahati, named after sage Vashistha.

== Amenities ==
151 Base Hospital of the Indian Army is a major civil and military hospital located in Basistha. Games Village, which housed players and officials during the 2007 National Games of India, is a major residential complex which also includes the tallest buildings in Guwahati, the Shangri-La Towers.

== Geography ==
To the north of Basistha is Beltola, to its east is Patarkuchi, to its south is the Ri-Bhoi district of Meghalaya and to its west is Garbhanga Wildlife Sanctuary.

== Location ==
Basistha Temple is located in the extreme south of the locality with the hermitage of sage Vashistha, popularly known as Basistha Ashram. The Basistha river flows through the temple compound.

Basistha Ashram's scenic surroundings make it a major picnic spot within the city, alongside its religious importance in Hinduism. NH 37 passes through Basistha Square or chowk which makes the area a hotspot for inter-state transport.

== See also ==
- Adabari
- Bhetapara
- Ganeshguri
- Kamakhya
