= Pan Bazaar =

Locality in Assam, India

- Sukreshwar Temple in Pan Bazaar
- Interactive map of Pan Bazaar
- Coordinates: 26.185°N 91.7474°E
- Country: India
- State: Assam
- Region: Western Assam
- District: Kamrup Metropolitan

Area
  - Total: 2.53 km^{2} (0.98 sq mi)

Dimensions
  - Length: 2.19 km (1.36 mi)
  - Width: 1.90 km (1.18 mi)
- Time zone: UTC+5:30 (IST)
- Area code: 781028
- Vehicle registration: AS - 01
- Website: gmc.assam.gov.in

Pan Bazaar (also spelled as Panbazar; Assamese pronunciation: [pan bɔzaɹ]) is a locality in Guwahati, India surrounded by localities of Paltan Bazaar, Ambari and Fancy Bazaar. Situated on the banks of the river Brahmaputra, it is part of the city centre.

Pan Bazaar means "betel-leaf mart" in English. The locality is known for its various administrative, cultural and religious buildings. It is also known for being a shopping district.

The District Court (Kamrup) and the Guwahati branch of the Reserve Bank of India are major administrative buildings located in Pan Nazaar.

Restaurants and bookshops in the area provide a unique environment. It is also a major wholesale market for drugs and pharmaceutical products and a hub for printing and publication. Close to Dighalipukhuri, there are many stores with traditional arts and crafts from Assam and other parts of the North East Region. Kachari Ghat, next to the district court is an important local river port.

Pan Bazaar is known as one of the cultural and educational hotspots of Gauhati. Area is house for many historic buildings like of Kamarupa Anusandhan Samiti, Assam State Museum and District Library. The Nehru Park and Sukreswar Temple are other major tourist magnets of this area.

Cotton University also is situated here. Cotton College, Handique Girls College, Cotton Collegiate Government H.S. School and Don Bosco High School are prominent educational institutes of this area which has state level importance.

Pan Bazaar was one of the sites affected by the 2008 Assam bombings. In 2018, it was the site of a low intensity bomb blast which injured 4 people.

== See also ==
- Beltola
- Chandmari
- Ganeshguri
- Maligaon
- Narengi
