= Hengrabari =

Indian demographic area

Coordinates: 26.150°N 91.802°E

Hengrabari is a district in the capital city of Guwahati of Assam, a state on the north-east of India. Densely populated, Hengrabari resembles the character of a small town in the heart of Guwahati. A few decades ago the areas around Hengrabari were covered with dense forest, tall trees and wild bushes. However, with the pressure of increase in population, these forests were burned and cleared, the hillocks were cut down and the plain agricultural land were filled up for building houses and commercial shops.

== Etymology ==
Hengrabari is Boro origin. Hengra means barrier and Bari means forest or village.

== Description ==
Hengrabari has now been divided into two parts, lower hengrabari and upper hengrabari. Borbari which borders upper hengrabari are populated by the indigenous tribal people. With the construction of a national highway road passing through upper hengrabari and borbari, the area has been emerging as a commercial hub.

Thamakitilla is a small hillock on the southern side of the areas bordering upper hengrabari. This hillock is densely populated and consisted of around seventy residential houses. A vernacular high school and a college is situated to the south of Thamakitilla. To the eastern side of Thamakitilla is a low-lying paddy fields. In the rainy season these low-lying paddy fields remain submerged with rain water, limiting cultivators to grow paddy only on a part of the considerably elevated land.

== Culture ==
An old mythological story runs that the present elevated land Thamakitilla was the divine place where Gods and goddesses were used to halt during their journey. People believe that there exist a divine boat made of stone on the eastern side of Thamakitilla that touches the low-lying paddy fields. On the north-eastern part of the hillock, there is a temple of Goddess Mata Vaishno Devi. It is believed that this place has been a favourite destination of the supreme divine.

A temple also exist on the top of the hillock and people gather there for prayer on various occasions. This temple belongs to the Hindu God, Lord Shiva, the protector of living beings. (inputs from Bharat Prasad, shall provide more..). A very famous Kali temple is also present in the area which also consist of the temple of lord Shiva, the Sani temple and the Ganesh temple. The temple is said to have a great historical significance and was established during the time when the place was ruled by the Rani or the Queen of Beltola. The main structure of the temple was constructed in the late 1970s and its development is further going on with the help various donations received from the people. The temple celebrates various festivals like the Shivaratri, Ganesh Puja and the Kali Puja being the most significant. During Kali Puja many devotees throng the temple from different parts of the city as well the state to take blessings of Goddess Kali. Apart from these an annual ritual known as "Jagya" in the local language is also performed for the well being of the people belonging to the locality. There are several Reserved Forests (Indian Forest Act, 1927) in and around Guwahati. The reserved forests within the limits of Guwahati Municipal Corporation, are Hengrabari, Phatasil and Jalukbari. These forests are under the administrative control of the Divisional Forest Officer, Kamrup (East) Forest Division. The other reserved forests around Guwahati are Rani and Garbhanga RFs. Deepar Beel, which is a vast expanse of water body on the western side of the city is not only a Ramsar site, but also is a Wildlife Sanctuary. The forests act as the green lung of Guwahati, but, unfortunately, a large chunk of the area is encroached by unauthorized occupants.

The Rani and Garbhanga RFs have a large population of elephants. Sometimes, wild elephants visit and damage the paddy crops around the Deepar Beel area. To control the menace, and streamline wildlife management in and around Guwahati, the Government of Assam constituted Guwahati Wildlife Division in early 2006.
