= Northeast Frontier Railway Stadium =

Sports stadium in India

North-East Frontier Railway Stadium
- NFRS
- Interactive map of North-East Frontier Railway Stadium
- Full name: North-East Frontier Railway Stadium
- Location: Maligaon, Guwahati, Assam
- Coordinates: 26°09′15″N 91°41′50″E
- Owner: Northeast Frontier Railway
- Capacity: 10,000

Construction
- Groundbreaking: 1976
- Opened: 1976

Tenant
- Assam cricket team

North-East Frontier Railway Stadium is a multi-purpose stadium at Maligaon in Guwahati, Assam. It is mainly used for organizing matches of football and cricket. The stadium has hosted 33 first-class matches in 1976 when Assam cricket team played against Orissa cricket team. The ground hosted 32 more first-class matches from 1978 to 2009. The stadium also hosted 18 List A matches when Central Zone cricket team played against North Zone cricket team but since then the stadium has hosted non-first-class matches.
