= Maligaon Chariali =

Coordinates: 26°09′00″N 91°41′00″E

Maligaon Chariali is the focal -point of Maligaon, in Guwahati. It is located between Jalukbari Point and Kamakhya foot hill of famous Kamakhya Temple. The road passing through Maligaon earlier was called Assam Trunk Road and during ist tenure of AGP, the road has been christened as the Dinesh Goswami Road. The word ‘chariali’ in Assamese means ‘a place where four roads meet. Towards the west from Maligaon Chariali one finds the Dinesh Goswami road (old Assam Trunk Road) approaching Jalukbari via Adabari, while towards the east, one approaches Kamakhya foot hill. A few decades back Maligaon was not part of Guwahati but of Pandu; from 1975 Maligaon became part of Guwahati (Municipality Corporation). The Padmanath Gohain Baruah Road (P.N.G.B. Road) runs from Maligaon Chariali to NH-37 at Tetelia via Maligaon Goshala. The fourth road is the one that originates at Maligaon Chariali and runs northwest towards Pandu Cabin, touching Aruna Cinema Hall and Pandu College on the way. The Jalukbari Police Station lies at this corner of the Chariali. A foot overbridge for pedestrians has been inaugurated in early 2013.

The Kamakhya Railway Junction leads from Maligaon Chariali. This Railway station earlier named as Jalukbari.
