= Assam Administrative Staff College =

Civil service training institution in Guwahati, India

- Type: Civil Service Training Institute
- Established: 1960
- Affiliations: Government of Assam
- Director: Smti Riju Gogoi, IAS
- Location: Guwahati, Assam
- Campus: Jawaharnagar, Khanapara
- Website: aasc.assam.gov.in

The Assam Administrative Staff College (AASC ) is a civil service training institute for Assam Administrative Service Cadre on public policy and public administration in Assam and for conducting Civil Service Foundation Programme of other allied civil services in Assam. Operated by the Government of Assam, AASC is located in Guwahati, Assam.

== Activities of the College ==
- Conduct foundation courses for Assam Administrative Service, Assam Police Service, Assam Land and Revenue Service, Assam Finance Service, Superintendent of Taxes, Assistant Manager of Industries, Registrar and other allied civil services included therein selected after qualifying from Assam Public Service Commission Common Competitive Examination for Government of Assam.
- Conduct training need analysis
- Design training programs
- Prepare, update training materials
- Internally validate the training course to improve training
- Conduct external validation
- Continuously update the methodology of training to make it cost effective
- Adhere to the concept of Systematic Approach to Training
- Conduct foundation courses for State Civil Service Officers and other departmental officials of North-Eastern States
- Conduct orientation and refresher courses in Management, Development Administration, Rural Development, Decentralized Planning Process, Project Formulation, Public Distribution System, computer systems, etc.
- Run several courses annually for Indian Administrative Service and Indian Police Service other allied services of Government of India
- Conduct courses sponsored by Government of India on Training of Trainers, Management of Training, Human Rights, Gender Issues, Hospital Administration, Computer Application etc.
