= Army Public School, Narangi =

Coordinates: 26.1416°N 91.8381°E

- Narengi, Guwahati 781027; India

Information
- Type: Public school
- Motto: Truth Is God
- Established: 28 June 1982; 44 years ago
- Grades: 1 to 12
- Enrollment: 3200
- Houses: Manekshaw , Cariappa , Chaudhuri , Thimayya
- Affiliation: Central Board of Secondary Education
- Information: 0361-2642299
- Website: apsnarangi.com

Army Public School, Narangi, was established in 1982. It is an Indian Army Public School in the Army Cantonment of Narengi in Guwahati, Assam, India.
