= Rehabari =

Coordinates: 26°10′18″N 91°44′55″E

Rehabari is a locality of Guwahati. It is surrounded by localities of Paltan Bazaar and Athgaon.

== Transport ==
Rehabari lies near the regional transportation hub of Paltan Bazar and is well connected to the rest of the city.

== See also ==
- Paltan Bazaar
- Rupnagar
