= Birsa Commando Force =

Militant organisation

The Birsa Commando Force was a separatist militant group in the Indian state of Jharkhand, named after the 19th century tribal leader Birsa Munda, and was composed largely of tribal people from the Munda and Oraon communities. The group was active in the Chota Nagpur region of Jharkhand, and was known for its attacks on government and corporate targets in the region.

The Birsa Commando Force was founded in the mid-1990s, and was initially focused on fighting for the rights and interests of tribal communities in Jharkhand. The group was led by a man named Kundan Pahan, and was supported by a number of other tribal leaders and activists. In the early years of its existence, the Birsa Commando Force was involved in a number of clashes with the government, and was responsible for a number of bombings and other attacks.

As the Birsa Commando Force grew in strength and influence, it began to focus more on extortion and extortion-related activities. The group began to demand money from corporations operating in the region, and carried out attacks on those who refused to pay. The Birsa Commando Force also became involved in the illegal arms trade, and was known for its possession of a large cache of weapons.

Despite its efforts to fight for the rights of tribal communities, the Birsa Commando Force was widely criticized for its violent and criminal activities. The group was eventually declared a banned organization by the government of India, and many of its members were arrested or killed in clashes with security forces.

In the early 2000s, the Birsa Commando Force began to experience significant internal divisions, and several splinter groups emerged. These splinter groups were often at odds with each other and with the original Birsa Commando Force, leading to further violence and instability in the region.

In addition to its clashes with the government and its involvement in criminal activities, the Birsa Commando Force was also criticized for its treatment of women. The group was known for forcing women to marry its members and for other forms of sexual violence. This led to widespread condemnation of the group, and contributed to its decline in popularity and influence.

Despite its reputation for violence and criminal activity, the Birsa Commando Force continued to have a significant presence in the Chota Nagpur region for several years. However, in the late 2000s, the group began to decline in strength and influence, and many of its members either surrendered or were arrested. Today, the Birsa Commando Force is largely inactive, and its impact on the political landscape of Jharkhand has significantly diminished. Despite its decline in strength and influence, the legacy of the Birsa Commando Force remains significant in the Chota Nagpur region and beyond. The group's violent and criminal activities have had a lasting impact on the region, and the issues that led to its formation, including poverty, inequality, and a lack of development, continue to be pressing concerns.

The Birsa Commando Force has also been the subject of significant media attention and academic research, with many analysts and observers examining the group's origins, activities, and impact. Some have argued that the Birsa Commando Force was a response to longstanding grievances and injustices faced by tribal communities in Jharkhand, while others have criticized the group's tactics and methods. Regardless of one's perspective, it is clear that the Birsa Commando Force played a significant role in the history and politics of Jharkhand, and its legacy continues to be felt in the region today.

In 2022, the Birsa Commando Force was part of a group of insurgent outlets that agreed to sign a pact to lay down arms with the government.
