= Maligaon =

- Neighbourhood
- Location in Assam, India Maligaon (Assam)
- Coordinates: 26°09′15″N 91°41′50″E
- Country: India
- State: Assam
- District: Kamrup Metropolitan district
- City: Guwahati

Government
  - Body: GMC
- Time zone: UTC+5:30 (IST)
- PIN: 781 XXX
- Vehicle registration: AS-01
- Lok Sabha constituency: Gauhati
- Vidhan Sabha constituency: Gauhati West
- Planning agency: GMC
- Civic agency: GMC

Maligaon is a locality of Guwahati, Assam. The headquarters of Northeast Frontier Railway and Northeast Frontier Railway Stadium is situated there.

== Transportation ==
=== Air ===
It is connected by air through Lokpriya Gopinath Bordoloi International Airport.

=== Railways ===
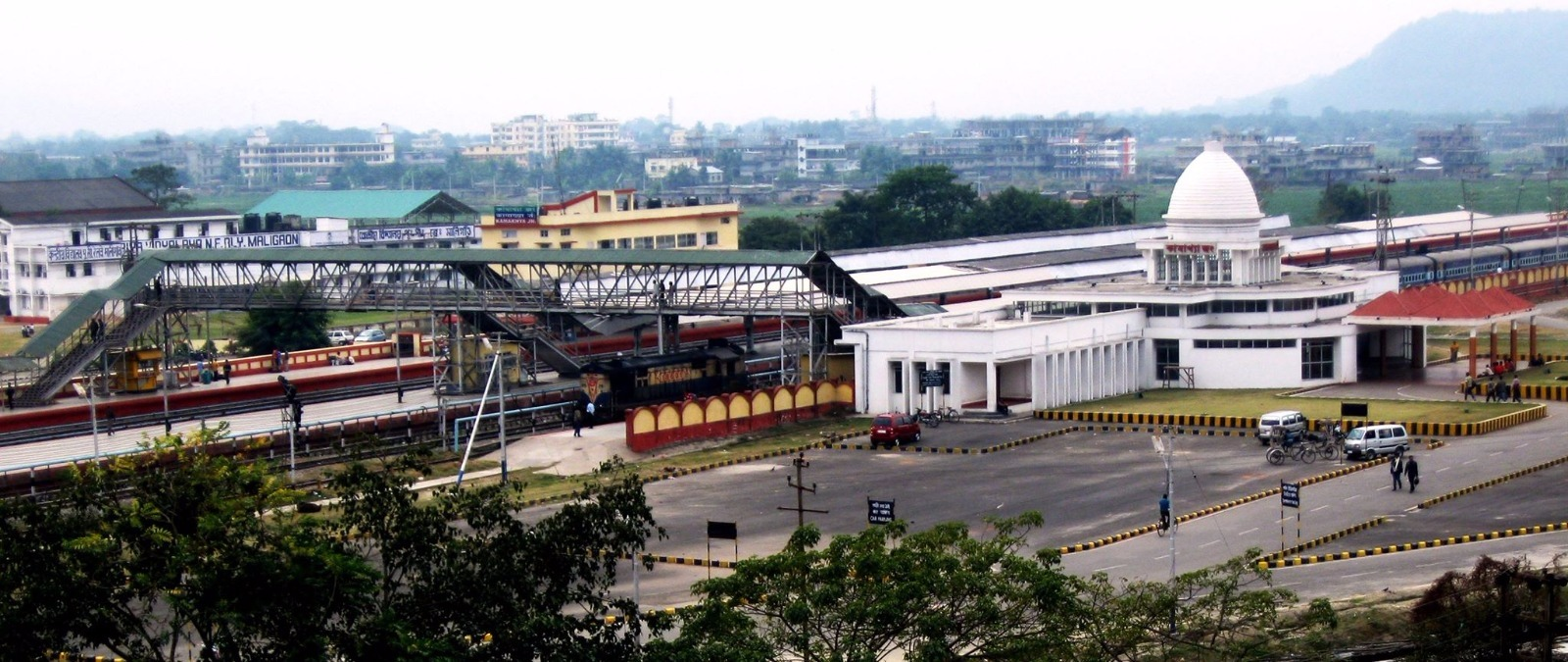
Kamakhya Junction

The Northeast Frontier Railway abbreviated as N.F. Railway is one of the 18 railway zones in Indian Railways, headquartered at Maligaon, it is responsible for rail operations in the entire Northeast and parts of West Bengal and Bihar. Kamakhya Junction, earlier named as Jalukbari, directly connects Maligaon with many major cities of the country. However, Guwahati Railway Station is a major railway station which is 4 miles (approx 7 km) from Central Maligaon.

== Education ==
- Kendriya Vidyalaya Maligaon
- Lalit Chandra Bharali College

== Hospitals ==
The area has a number of hospitals like the NF Railway Central Hospital, Swagat Hospital and Sanjevani Hospital. Also there is a Health Unit at Boripara run by the State Government.

== Festivals and people ==
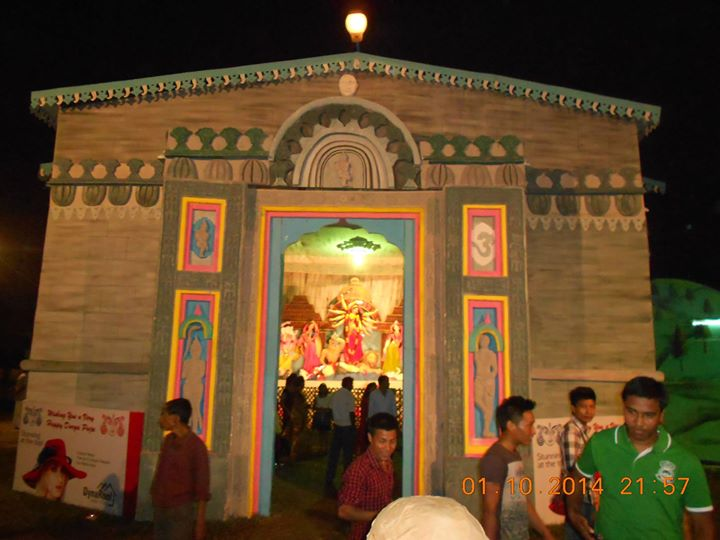
Nambari Durga Puja, 2004

Maligaon locality of Guwahati have a population of 50,065 people as per as 2011 census. There are diversified important traditional festivals in Maligaon. Durga Puja is the most important and common as the locality is dominated by Bengali Hindus who are predominant majority in this locality. Bengali new year is also celebrated with great enthusiasm.

== Places of interest ==
- Kamakhya Temple, atop the Neelachal hill, the highest spot in the city, draws pilgrims from all over India especially during the Ambubachi festival. A high seat of the shakti sect, it is associated with the legend of the mother goddess who slayed the legendary demon king Narakasur who ruled ancient Assam.
- Maligaon Chariali

== Sports ==
Northeast Frontier Railway Stadium is a multi-purpose stadium. The ground is mainly used for organizing matches of football, cricket and other sports. The stadium has hosted 33 rd first-class matches in 1976 when Assam cricket team played against Orissa cricket team. The ground hosted 32more first-class matches from 1978 to 2009. The stadium also hosted 18 List A matches when Central Zone cricket team played against North Zone cricket team but since then the stadium has hosted non-first-class matches.

== See also ==
- Bhetapara
- Beltola
- Chandmari
- Paltan Bazaar
- Ganeshguri
