= Guwahati Metropolitan Development Authority =

Metro region development authority of Guwahati

The Guwahati Metropolitan Development Authority (GMDA) is a state parastatal agency of the Government of Assam created for the Guwahati metropolitan area. It covers an area of 262 km^{2} (101 sq mi). The authority is responsible for planning and development of the metropolitan region and is currently preparing the revised master plan for Guwahati and the building bye-laws. The authority is also responsible for the activities related to building permissions in the city.
