= Narengi =

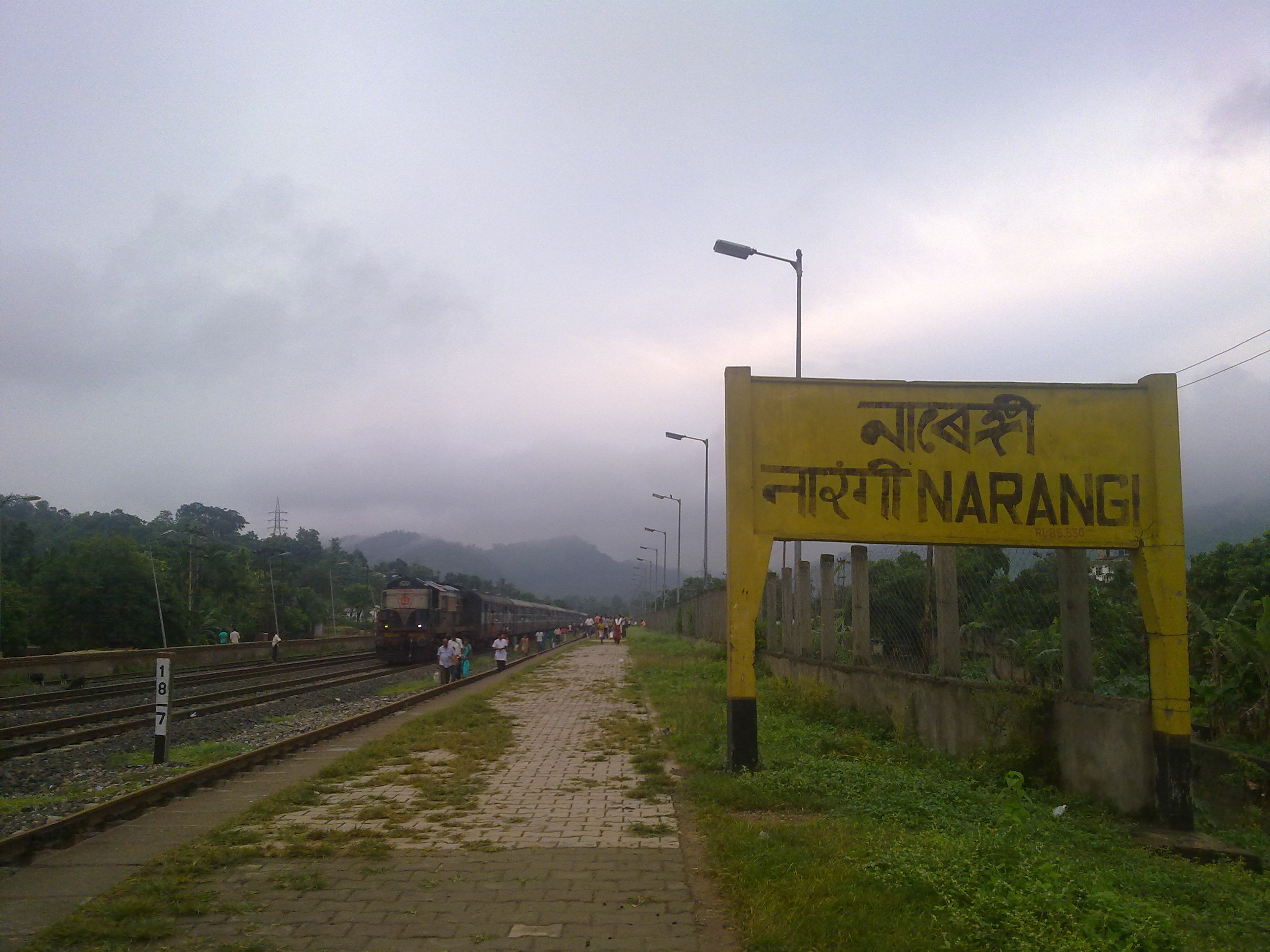
Narengi railway station

Narengi (Pron: nʌˈreŋgɪ or næˈreŋgɪ) is a locality in Guwahati. Situated in the extreme east of the city, it has a sparse population. The southern part of the locality houses an army camp, while the Narangi railway station is located in the southern area near the Assam State Electricity Board colony. This station serves as a connection for trains traveling to the districts of Eastern Assam. Narengi falls under the jurisdiction of Noonmati Police Station. The Pin code of Narengi is 781026.

== Education ==
There are several primary and high schools in this area. However, there are only a few colleges that offer a bachelor's degree, such as Narangi Anchalik Mahavidyalaya. Some of the local schools include Kendriya Vidyalaya (Narengi), Army Public School, Narangi, Sankardev Shishu/Vidya Niketan, East Point Montessori School, Narengi High School, ASEB High School, Adarsha Jatiya Vidyalaya, Maria's Public School, Bishnu Jyoti School, Narengi High School, Vidya Mandir English Medium High School, St. Francis De Sales School and MerryLand Public School.

== Recreation ==
In the LG Tower area, you can find the Gold Digital Cinema multiplex, which screens 2D movies. Thakuriya Novelty is the go-to place for gaming enthusiasts, offering various gaming options.

== Industries ==
The Pipeline Headquarters of Oil India is situated in Narengi. The PDP Steel branch of Assam Roofing Ltd is also located in Narengi. Additionally, there are other companies such as Kamakhya Plastics Private Limited and Assam Enterprise Limited.

== See also ==
- Chandmari
- Maligaon
- Uzan Bazaar
- Beltola
- Noonmati
- Panbazar
