= Guwahati Municipal Corporation =

Local civic body in Guwahati, Assam, India

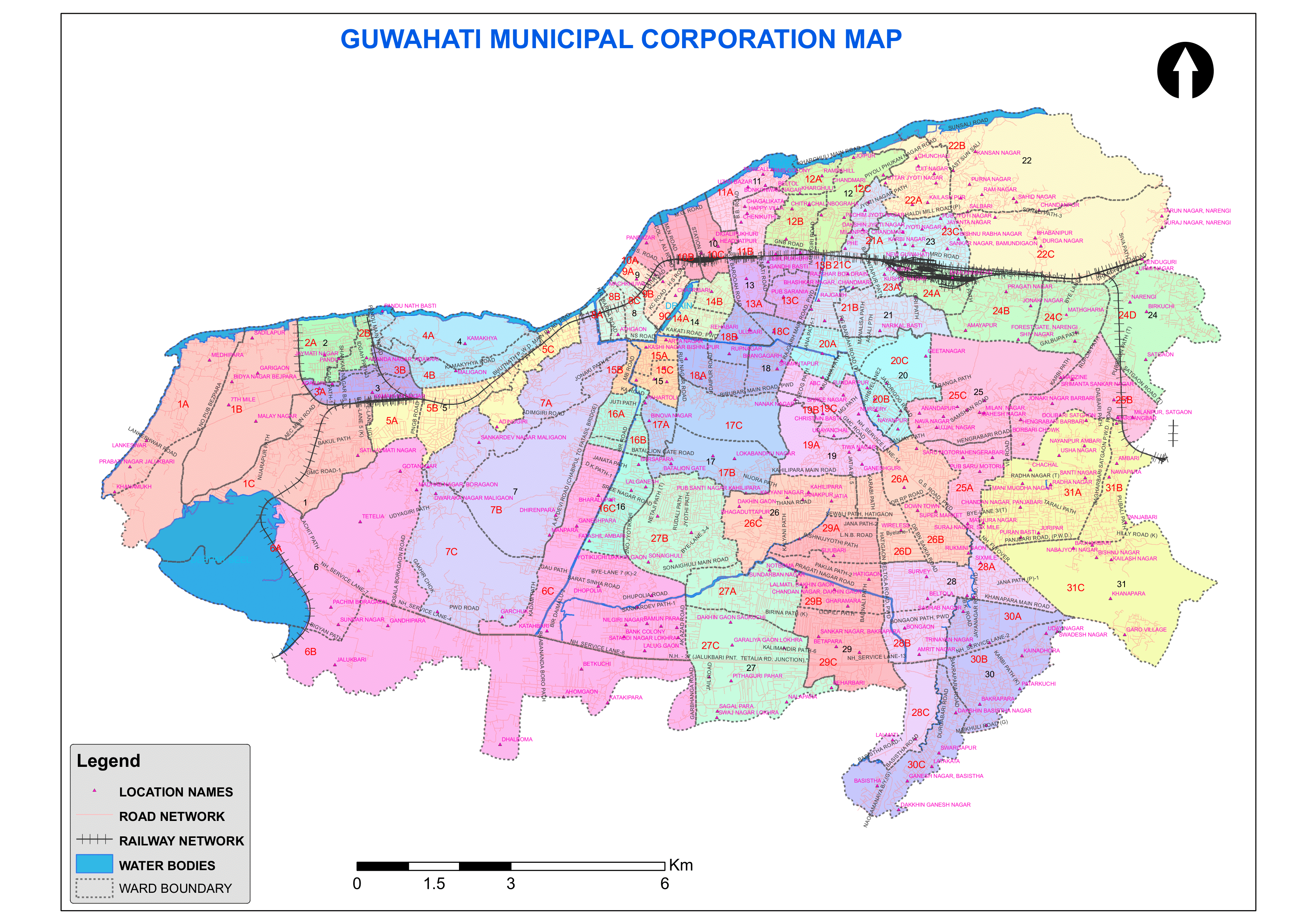
- Guwahati Municipal Corporation Map

Type
- Type: Municipal Corporation

History
- Founded: 1974; 52 years ago

Leadership
- Mayor: Mrigen Sarania, BJP
- Deputy Mayor: Smita Roy, BJP
- Commissioner: Megha Nidhi Dahal, IAS

Structure
- Seats: 60
- Political groups: Government (60); NDA (60): BJP (54); AGP (6)

Elections
- Last election: April 2022
- Next election: 2027

Meeting place
- Guwahati, Assam

Website
- gmc.assam.gov.in

Guwahati Municipal Corporation (GMC) is the local government in Guwahati, Assam, India. GMC was formed in the year 1971 by the Guwahati Municipal Corporation Act, 1969. The corporation was duly constituted in 1974 in the first meeting of the elected councillors as per provision of Sec.45 of this Act.

Municipal Corporation mechanism in India was introduced during British Rule with formation of municipal corporation in Madras (Chennai) in 1688, later followed by municipal corporations in Bombay (Mumbai) and Calcutta (Kolkata) by 1762. Guwahati Municipal Corporation Municipal Corporation is headed by the Mayor of the city and governed by a Commissioner.

A municipal corporation is the highest form of urban local body (ULB) in India. Presently, GMC is divided into 60 municipal wards.

== Organisational setup ==
The Mayor and the Deputy Mayor are responsible for the 60 municipal wards of Guwahati Municipality Corporation, who is the head of a council consisting of 60 elected ward commissioners.

The Commissioner is responsible for the proper functioning of the corporation. He is assisted by Additional Commissioner and Joint Commissioner. A Chief Engineer for The Water Works Department and the Public Works Department division is responsible. A Superintendent Engineer is responsible for the Garage branch.

The accounts branch is the responsibility of a Financial Advisor, a Chief Accounts, and an Audit Officer. Each revenue zone is headed by a Deputy Commissioner.

== Functions ==
Guwahati Municipal Corporation is created for the following functions:

- Planning for the town including its surroundings which are covered under its department's Urban Planning Authority.
- Approving construction of new buildings and authorising use of land for various purposes.
- Improvement of the town's economic and social status.
- Arrangements of water supply towards commercial, residential and industrial purposes.
- Planning for fire contingencies through fire service departments.
- Creation of solid waste management, public health system and sanitary services.
- Working for the development of ecological aspect like development of urban forestry and making guidelines for environmental protection.
- Working for the development of weaker sections of the society like mentally and physically handicapped, old age and gender biased people.
- Making efforts for improvement of slums and poverty removal in the town.

== Wards ==
| Zone | Ward Number | Ward Name | Areas Covered | Assembly Constituency | Councillor | Political Group |
|---|---|---|---|---|---|---|
| West | 1 | | Areas of Sodilapur, Dahan Garigaon, Kahari Garigaon, part of Pachim Jalukbari and part of Uttar Jalukbari | | Hukum Shan Ali Boxi | AJP |
| West | 2 | | Railway colony, part of Gotanagar, part of Uttar Jalukbari, majar Jalukbari, part of Pachim Jalukbari, parts of Tetelia and parts of Dakhin Jalukbari. | | Mukul Kalita | BJP |
| West | 3 | | New railway colony of Pandu, Ferry Ghat railway colony number 3, 4, 5 and 6 and Institute railway colony. | | Kallol Chakraborty | BJP |
| West | 4 | | Camp railway colony of Pandu, parts of Waterworks railway colony and temple Ghat colony. | | Kanaklata Saha | BJP |
| West | 5 | | Adabari and Garpandu. | | Sanjay Das* | BJP |
| West | 6 | | Maligaon, Triangular railway colony area, Loco railway colony, B.B.C Colony, Adabari railway colony, new Adabari railway colony, part of Sadilapur area, part of Uttar Jalukbari, part of Jalukbari and Garpandu. | | Sutapa Sarkar* | BJP |
| West | 7 | | Kamakhya temple area, Kamakhya railway colony and Pandu nath Basti. | | Ajay Chakraborty | BJP |
| West | 8 | | Kamkhya temple area and Kamakhya railway colony. | | Sudhanya Malakar | BJP |
| West | 9 | | West Maligaon railway colony, West Gotanagar railway colony, central Gotanagar railway colony, part of East Maligaon railway colony, East Gotanagar railway colony and Gosala railway colony. | | Archana Das | BJP |
| Lokhra | 10 | | Areas of Nambari, part of Gotanagar, Tetelia Gaon and Boragaon. | | Kalpana Das | AGP |
| West | 11 | | Fatashil, part of Datalpara, part of Manpara, part of Ganeshpara, part of Dhirenpara and part of Pub-Boragaon and Garchuk. | | Manjula Devi | BJP |
| West | 12 | | Parts of Gotanagar N.C., Maligaon N.C., part of Santipur and part of Devkota Nagarare. | | Dipankar Baishya | AGP |
| West | 13 | | Gotanagar, parts of Maligaon, Fatshil, Durgasarabor and Santipur. | | Purabi Talukdar | AGP |
| West | 14 | | Parts of Santipur area and Kumarpara area, and Bhutnath area. | | Manju Bora | BJP |
| West | 15 | | Machkhowa, parts of Kumarpara and part of Athgaon. | | Saurav Jhunjhunwala | BJP |
| Central | 16 | | Old jail campus, Shri Digambar Jain temple, GMC market complex and Vishwaratna hotel. | | Pramod Swami | BJP |
| South | 17 | | Panbazar and Lakhtokia | | Snigdha Baruah Mazumdar | BJP |
| Central | 18 | | Borsha Beel, KC Das Commerce College and Guwahati Lions eye hospital. | | Sankar Chakraborty | BJP |
| Central | 19 | | Dr B. Barooah cancer institute, Kalicharan nursing home, Fatasil harijan colony and Bishnupur. | | Brijesh Roy | BJP |
| Lokhra | 20 | | Part of Fatashil, Harizan colony, Bhaskar and Itabhata. | | Gour Gopal Mandal | BJP |
| Lokhra | 21 | | Bhaskar Nagar area, Barshapara area, part of Lalganesh and Ananda nagar area. | | Sandip Deb | BJP |
| Lokhra | 22 | | Part of Jotikuchi, Dhopolia area, Sankar Nagar area, Ram Nagar area and part of Odalbakra. | | Smita Roy* | BJP |
| Lokhra | 23 | | Part of Dhirenpara, part of Ganeshpara, part of Datal Para, Katahbari, Garchuk, part of Ahomgaon and Betkuchi fall. | | Manjita Daimary | BJP |
| Lokhra | 24 | | Lokhra area, Garbhanga area, Sarusajai area, Bor Sojai area, Sawkuchi and part of Dakhin Gaon. | | Biju Medhi | AGP |
| Lokhra | 25 | | Parts of Dakhingaon, Sonaighuli area, Jugashree Nagar, Odalbakra, Jyotishreenagar area, part of Jyotikuchi and part of Shreebhuminagar. | | Manjula Rabha | BJP |
| Lokhra | 26 | | Part of Kahilipara, Lutuma area, Binova Nagar area, refugee colony, Narakasur area and part of cycle factory area. | | Rana Chetia | BJP |
| Lokhra | 27 | | Birubari, parts of Rupnagar, Nizarapara, Pragati Pur area and part of Guwahati medical college area. | | Rintu Moni Brahma | BJP |
| Central | 28 | | Lachit nagar, SB Deorah college, Rupnagar and Pir Baba Dargah. | | Snigdha Daimar | BJP |
| Central | 29 | | Madhab Das high school, Udaypur, Brindaban Seva ashram and Meen Bhawan. | | Mrigen Sarania | BJP |
| Central | 30 | | DGP office, Arya hospital, Suhagpur and Rehabari post office. | | Binita Dutta Choudhury | BJP |
| South | 31 | | Digholi pukhuri and Paltanbazar . | | Ratna Singh | BJP |
| South | 32 | | Kharghuli area part, Uzanbazar and Jorpukhuri area. | | Nilima Jyoti Bhuyan | BJP |
| South | 33 | | Kharghuli area part, Nabagraha temple area, Chenikuthi area and Hadayatpur. | | Meera Das Sarkar | AGP |
| South | 34 | | Kharghuli area part, Jaypur, Nizarapar and Nabagraha Samshan area | | Junumoni Deka Das | BJP |
| South | 35 | | Chandmari, Milanpur, Krishnanpur and Nizarapara. | | Nabin Bora | BJP |
| South | 36 | | Rajgarh area, Pub sarania, Lachit Nagar, South Sarania, Gandhi Basti and Islampur. | | Meghna Hazarika | BJP |
| East | 37 | | RGB road and Rajgarh link road. | | Swapna Devi | BJP |
| East | 38 | | Anil Nagar and Nabin Nagar | | Sasanka Jyoti Deka | BJP |
| East | 39 | | Bhangagarh, Ganeshguri and RGB road. | | Abhik Shome | BJP |
| East | 40 | | Parts of medical college, Christian Basti, Udayachal, Ganeshguri and part of Kahilipara and jatia. | | Babita Deka | BJP |
| Dispur | 41 | | Jatia, Khilipara, Dakhingaon, Hatigaon, Basisthapur | | Basanti Kalita Dowerah | BJP |
| Dispur | 42 | | Barsajai(part), Hatigaon(part), Notboma(part) and Embankment road(part) | | Masuma Begum | AAP |
| Dispur | 43 | | Sarusajai, Barsajai, Saukuchi, and Nalapara area. | | Anjana Bora | BJP |
| Dispur | 44 | | Basistha(part), NH 37(part), Barpathar, and Ganesh Nagar area (part) | | Satyendra Nath Bhattacharjee | BJP |
| Dispur | 45 | | Maidam area (part), Khanapara area (part), Bhakrapara area (part) and Basistha area (part). | | Madhabi Talukdar | BJP |
| Dispur | 46 | | Khanpara area (part NC), Maidam area (part), Beltola area (part) and Khanapara area (part). | | Ashis Bharali | BJP |
| Dispur | 47 | | Beltola (part), Bongaon and Hatigaon area. | | Prafulla Mahanta | BJP |
| Dispur | 48 | | Rukminigaon (part), GS road (part) and capital complex. | | Dulumoni Kakati | BJP |
| Dispur | 49 | | Sorumotoria, Hengrabari, VIP road, Dwarka nagar area and Mathura nagar area. | | Arup Deka | BJP |
| East | 50 | | Japrigog | | Utpal Mahanta | BJP |
| Dispur | 51 | | Hengrabari | | Dimple Rabha | BJP |
| East | 52 | | Madgaria, Kushal nagar area and Hengrabari area | | Gokul Goswami | BJP |
| East | 53 | | Jyotinagar, Bamunimaidam and new Gauhati railway colony. | | Lipika Patowary | BJP |
| East | 54 | | Chandmari, Milanpur and Krishna Nagar area (part). | | Geeta Thakuria Kalita | BJP |
| East | 55 | | Noonmati, Jyotinagar, Choonsali area, Bamunimaidam and Ananda nagar. | | Manoj Kumar Nath | BJP |
| East | 56 | | Bhabanipur, Number 2 Salbari, Sector-3 and New Guwahati. | | Rakhi Bora | BJP |
| East | 57 | | Noonmati refinery, Number 1 Salbari, Gopal Nagar, Swahid Nagar and Kenduguri. | | Kabita Sarmah | BJP |
| East | 58 | | Birkuchi, Kalitakuchi(part), Satgaon and Narengi housing colony. | | Gauri Bora | BJP |
| Dispur | 59 | | Baghorbari(part), Satgaon (part), Hengrabari (part), Dwaranda (part) and Juripur (part). | | Ashim Saikia | AGP |
| Dispur | 60 | | Bagorbari(part), Satgaon(part) and Madhab Nagarof Khanapara area. | | Bhupen Baruah | BJP |
*uncontested winner

== Elections ==
2013 Guwahati Municipal Corporation election
| Party | Seats won |
|---|---|
| Indian National Congress | 19 |
| Bharatiya Janata Party | 11 |
| Asom Gana Parishad | 1 |
| Others | 0 |

2022 Guwahati Municipal Corporation election
| Party | Seats contested | Seats won | Seats +/− | Vote % |
|---|---|---|---|---|
| Bharatiya Janata Party | 53 | 52 | ▲41 | 59.31% |
| Asom Gana Parishad | 7 | 6 | ▲5 | 7.01% |
| Aam Aadmi Party | 39 | 1 | ▲1 | 10.69% |
| Assam Jatiya Parishad | 24 | 1 | ▲1 | 3.85% |
| Indian National Congress | 57 | 0 | ▼19 | 13.71% |
| Communist Party of India (Marxist) | 4 | 0 | Steady | 0.61% |
| Others | N/A | 0 | Steady | 2.78% |
| NOTA | N/A | | | 2.02% |

== Branches ==
- Conservancy
- Water Works Tax Division
- Public Works
- Building Permission
- Street light and Electrical Section
- Municipal Markets
- Sanitation & Health
- Veterinary
- Enforcement
- Property Tax
- Mutation Branch
- Trade Licence
- Advertisement
- Slow Moving Vehicle Branch
- Dead body and night soil removal Branch
- Poverty alleviation
- Birth and death registration
- Garage Branch
- Accounts Branch

== Sources of revenue ==
- Property tax comprising a general tax, water tax, scavenging tax, light tax, and urban tax
- Trade licence fee
- Entry toll
- Parking fees
- Toll and rent from municipal markets
- Tax on advertisements
- Tax on slow moving vehicles
- Animal tax
- Building permission fees and penalties
- Water connection charge
- Fines
- Share of motor vehicle tax
- Share of entertainment tax
- Share of land revenue and surcharge on stamp duty

== See also ==
- Guwahati Metropolitan Development Authority
