= Jalukbari =

Locality in Assam, India

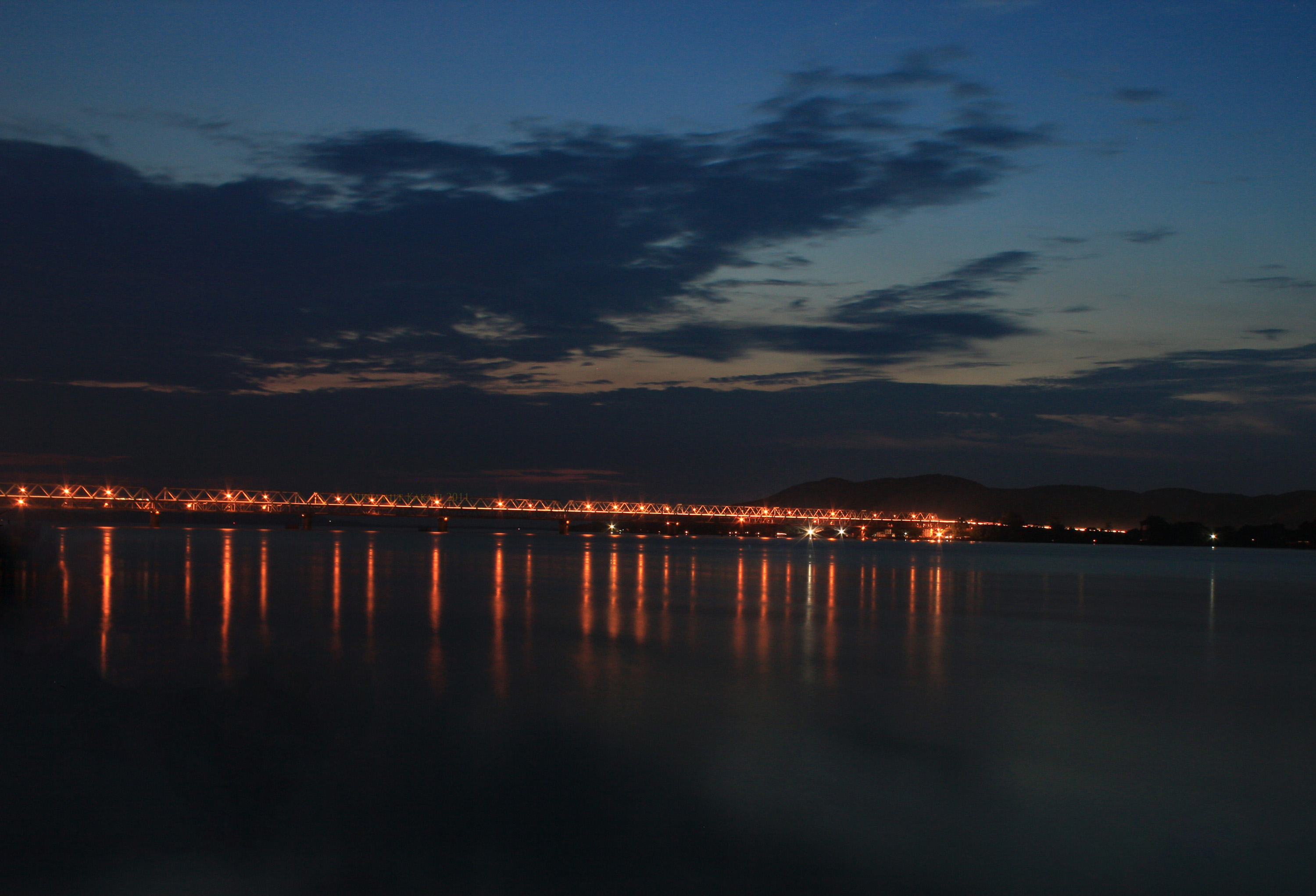
View of Saraighat Bridge

Jalukbari is a locality in Guwahati, Assam, India, located between National Highway 31 and National Highway 37.

== Education ==
Gauhati University, Assam Engineering College, Assam Science and Technology University (ASTU) Government Ayurvedic College, Jalukbari Sanskrit School are some of the educational institutions located in Jalukbari. Indian Institute of Technology Guwahati is situated at around 8 km away from Jalukbari. All India Institute of Medical Sciences is going to be set up at Changsari which is 17 km from Jalukbari. Girijananda Chowdhury Institute of Management and Technology is situated at 11 km distance from Jalukbari.

== Landmarks ==
National Highway 31 passes through Saraighat Bridge in Jalukbari. Dr. Bhupen Hazarika's Samadhi Khetra is situated at Jalukbari

== Transport ==
Guwahati International Airport is 13 km and Guwahati Railway Station is 12 km from Jalukbari. However, the nearest railway station is the Kamakhya station, which is just 3 km to the east. This area is connected with regular city buses along with other modes of transport.

== See also ==
- Guwahati
- Western Assam
- Assam
