= Beltola =

Suburb

- Suburb
- Interactive map of Beltola
- Coordinates: 26.1241°N 91.7994°E
- Country: India
- State: Assam
- Region: Western Assam
- District: Kamrup Metropolitan
- Founder: Beltola Rani
- Named for: Queen of Beltola, Koch Kingdom

Area
  - Total: 2.53 km^{2} (0.98 sq mi)

Dimensions
  - Length: 2.19 km (1.36 mi)
  - Width: 1.90 km (1.18 mi)
- Time zone: UTC+5:30 (IST)
- Area code: 781028
- Vehicle registration: AS - 01
- Website: https://gmc.assam.gov.in/

Beltola is a residential area in the southern part of Guwahati, Assam.

It is an adjoining area of the Dispur Capital Complex, the capital of Assam. The area has seen rapid growth since the 1980s and its southern periphery is today extended up to the National Highway-27 (NH-27) in the extreme south of the city. It covers an area of about 2.53 km^{2} or 27,221,804.44 ft².

Beltola Bazar, located in the central part of Beltola, is a bi-weekly market for fruits and vegetables with historical significance. The market dates back to the late medieval period and serves as a traditional trading point between the people of the Garo and Khasi hills (Meghalaya) and the local community. The market offers a variety of local food products.

== Landmark ==
The proposed Twin Tower World Trade Centre project in Beltola, set to be completed in the near future, will be a 280 meter (918.635 foot) tall complex featuring 65 floors with a cinema, shopping mall, convention centre, auditorium, seminar rooms, food courts, outdoor amphitheatre, museum, commercial and residential offices, service apartments, and a 200-metre-tall (660 ft) sky park covering 2 acres. The sky park will include a public observatory, restaurant with views of the city, the Brahmaputra River, and surrounding hills. The project, which is being developed by the National Buildings Construction Corporation Ltd. (NBCC) at a cost of approximately 2500 crore rupees, is intended to serve as a major landmark for not only Beltola, but the entire northeast region.

== Notes ==
On 24 November 2007, an Adivasi rally turned violent, leading to arson and violent confrontations that left 1 person dead and 230 others injured. The events preceding the violence in Beltola are unclear. Raphael Kujurd, vice-president of the All Adivasi Students' Association of Assam, has stated that he believes the Adivasi National Liberation Army (ANLA) and the Birsa Commando Force, both Adivasi militant groups, may have been involved.

== See also ==
- History of Beltola
- Bhetapara
- Chandmari
- Ganeshguri
- Maligaon
- Paltan Bazaar
- Ulubari
