= Ganeshguri =

Locality in India

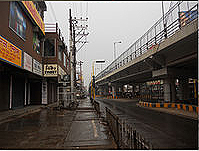
- Ganeshguri fly over
- Interactive map of Ganeshguri
- Coordinates: 26.153°N 91.783°E
- Country: India
- State: Assam
- Region: Western Assam
- District: Kamrup Metropolitan

Area
  - Total: 2.53 km^{2} (0.98 sq mi)

Dimensions
  - Length: 2.19 km (1.36 mi)
  - Width: 1.90 km (1.18 mi)
- Time zone: UTC+5:30 (IST)
- Area code: 781028
- Vehicle registration: AS - 01
- Website: gmc.assam.gov.in

Ganeshguri is a locality in Guwahati, Assam, India, and is named after lord Ganesh. There is also a Ganesh Temple located in its southern part. The region was ruled by a chief who styled himself as Herambadhipati (Heramba is another name for Ganesha) in the late 16th century. An inscription mentions that the ruler named Dununtrarāi donated a tank in Pragjyotishpura in the year 1577 A.D.

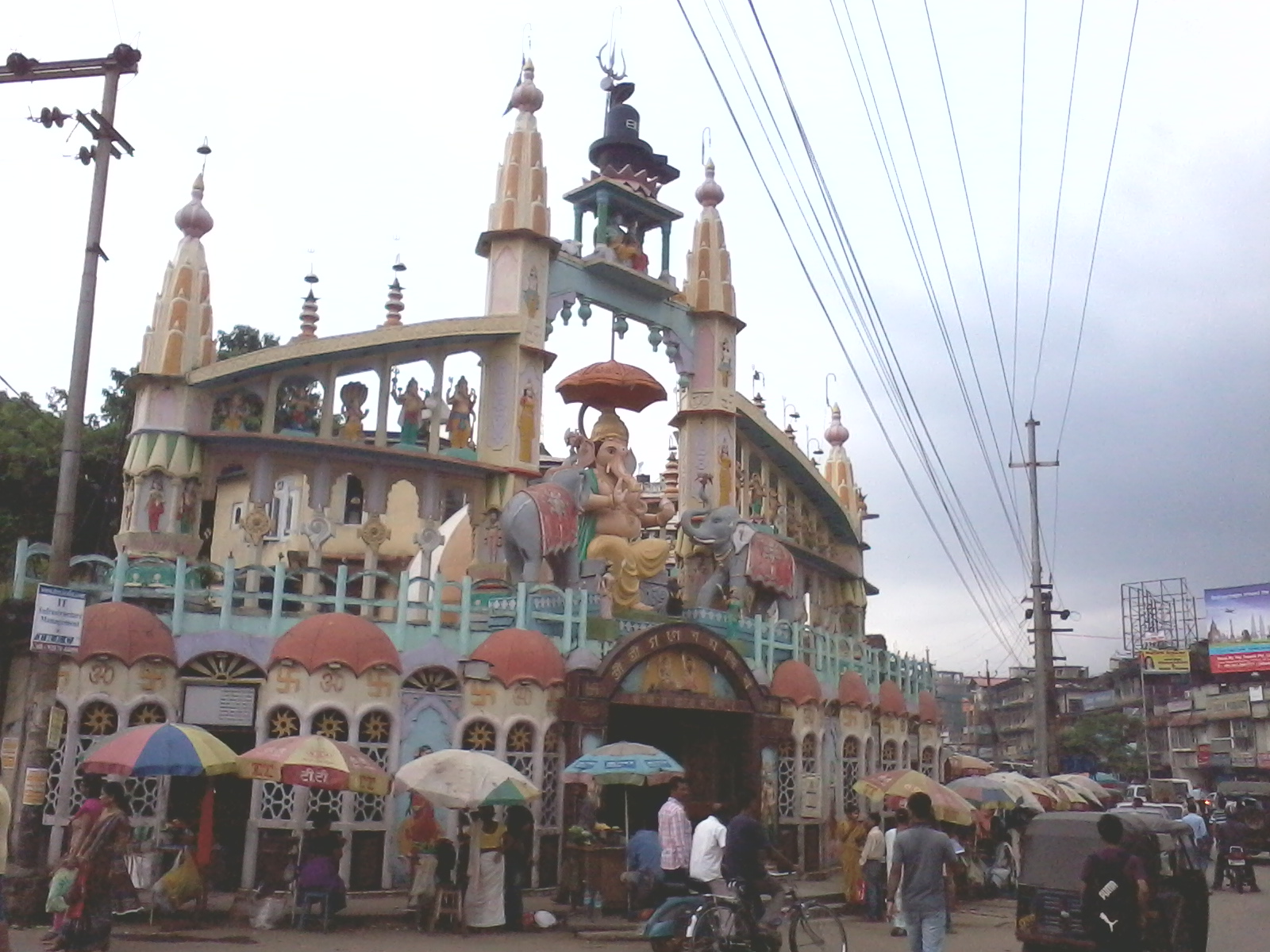
Ganesh temple

Situated in the capital complex of Guwahati city, it is a major commercial area within the city. Assam State Secretariat Buildings are located here. Ganeshguri is one of the major commercial areas of Guwahati city. The market consists mainly of various segments such as garments, crockeries, home decor, music stores, medical stores, sweet stores, groceries, automobile showroom etc. Various restaurants have been opened up in the area serving various cuisines. Fast food chains like Pizza Hut, KFC, McDonald's have opened up. Ethnic restaurants like Payel Bhojanalaya, Janming and Gam's Delicacy have made the area a popular place for outings. Several important establishments such as Guwahati Tea Auction Centre, Ambarish Hotel etc. are located here.

== See also ==
- Beltola
- Bhetapara
- Chandmari
- Maligaon
- Paltan Bazaar

== Bibliography ==
- Shin, Jae-Eun (2020). "Descending from demons, ascending to kshatriyas: Genealogical claims and political process in pre-modern Northeast India, The Chutiyas and the Dimasas". The Indian Economic and Social History Review. 57 (1): 49–75. doi:10.1177/0019464619894134. S2CID 213213265.
- Boruah, Nirode (2003). "Pragjyotisapura – the Capital City of Early Assam". Proceedings of the Indian History Congress. 64: 337–347. ISSN 2249-1937. JSTOR 44145474.
