= Bhetapara =

Locality in Assam, India

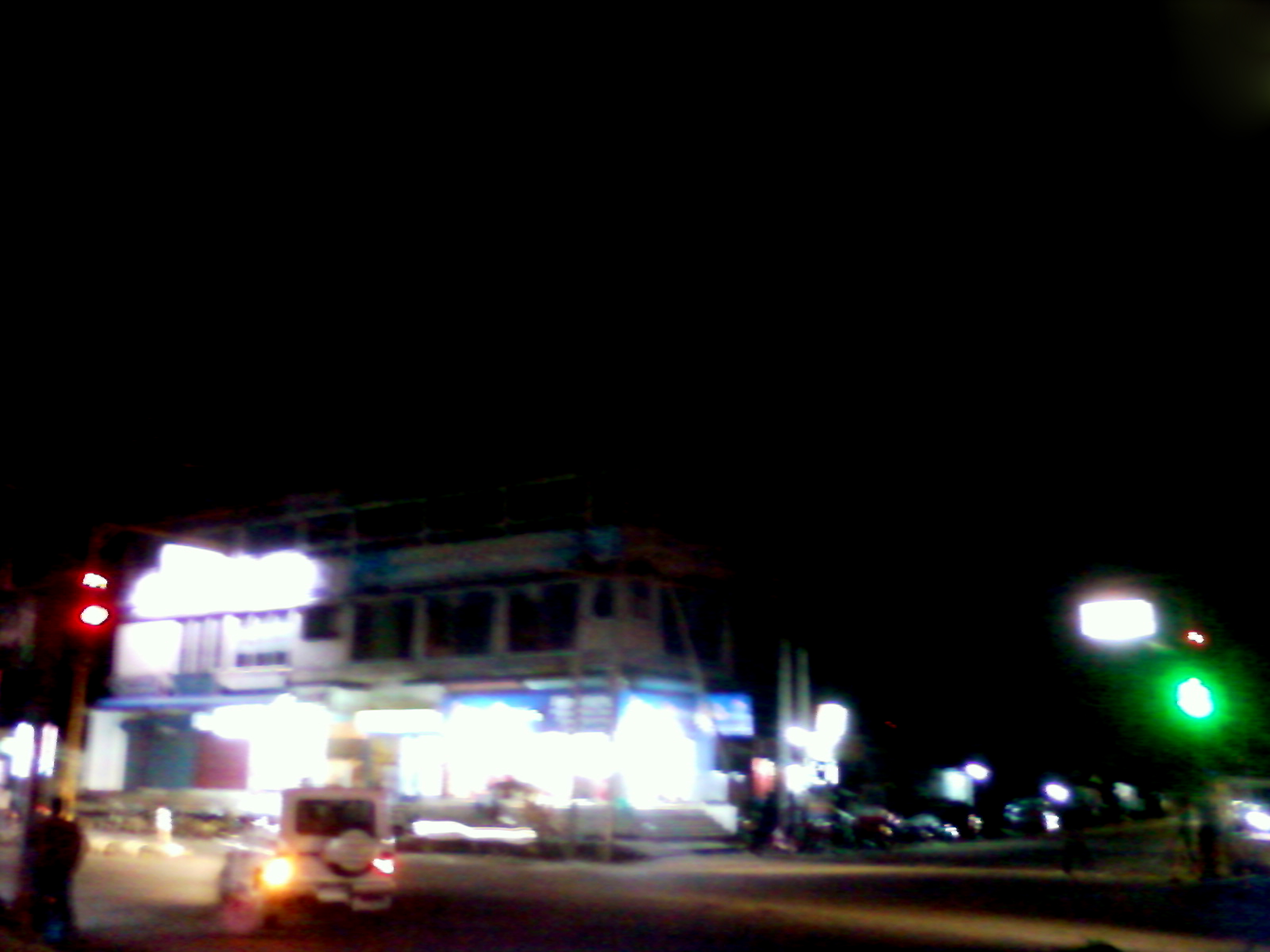
Bhetapara

Bhetapara is a fast-growing mixed residential and commercial area of Guwahati city in Kamrup Metropolitan district in Assam state in India. It connects the Indira Gandhi Athletic Stadium (main stadium of national games of country which held in the city in 2006) to the rest of the city.

== Health ==
One Ayurvedic Health Centre under central government is located here.

== Sports ==
Maulana Md. Tayabullah Hockey Stadium is located here which hosted hockey matches at all levels and was the main stadium that hosted hockey matches during the 33rd National Games 2007, Guwahati, and also during the 2016 South Asian Games which was held in Guwahati and Shillong.

== Transport ==
It has a well-developed system of roads. It is connected with other parts of the city by buses (run both by private operators and ASTC), trekkers, e-rickshaws and other modes of transportation. It is connected to National Highway 37.

== Notable people ==
- Deepak Bhuyan, actor
- Mihir Vikash Mahanta, businessperson

== See also ==
- Beltola
- Chandmari
- Ganeshguri
- Maligaon
- Paltan Bazaar
