= Paltan Bazaar =

- Locality
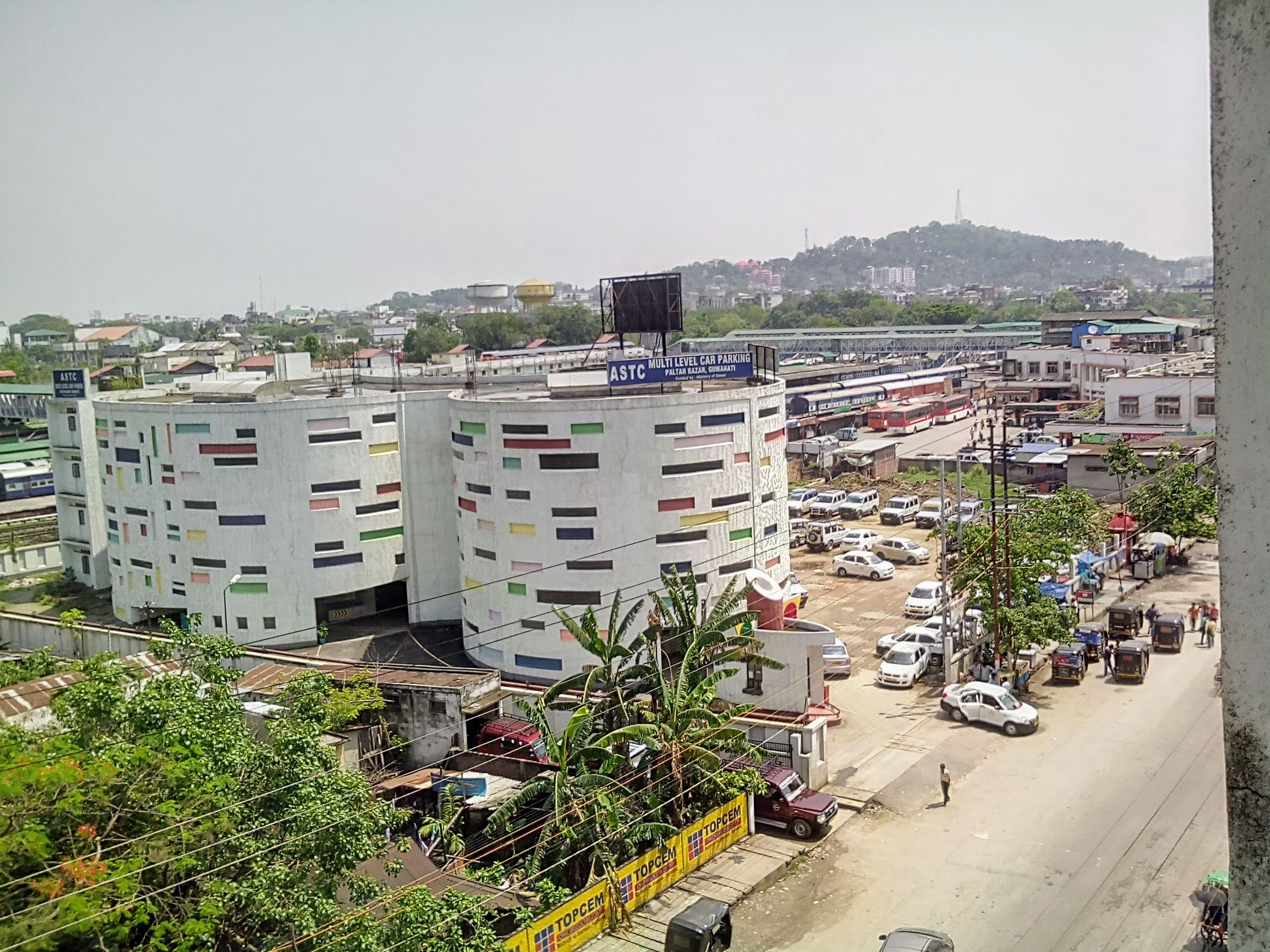
- ASTC bus stand with Guwahati Railway Station in the background is the most prominent landmark of the locality
- Interactive map of Paltan Bazaar
- Coordinates: 26°10′46″N 91°45′8″E
- Country: India
- State: Assam
- District: Kamrup Metropolitan

Languages
  - Official: Assamese
- Time zone: UTC+5:30 (IST)
- PIN: 781001
- Vehicle registration: AS

Paltan Bazaar is a locality of Guwahati, Assam. It is surrounded by the localities of Pan Bazaar, Ulubari, Rehabari, Fancy Bazaar. Its location in the central part of the city-centre is the hub for transportation and hotels in Guwahati, Assam. With Guwahati Railway Station, the ASTC bus stand, numerous hotels, restaurants, offices and stops of numerous private bus service (regional) providers, makes it one of the busiest and congested area of city. There are also many small shops selling traditional garments from various parts of the North-East.

== See also ==
- Bazaar
- Beltola
- Bhetapara
- Chandmari
- Ganeshguri
- Hawker centre (Asia) a centre where street food is sold
- Haat bazaar
- Maligaon
- Market (place)
- Pan Bazaar
- Peddler
- Retail
- Street vendor
- Street food
