= Chandmari, Guwahati =

Neighborhood in Guwahati, Assam, India

Chandmari
- Suburb
- Interactive map of Chandmari
- Coordinates: 26°11′24″N 91°46′28″E
- Country: India
- State: Assam
- Region: Western Assam
- District: Kamrup Metropolitan

Area
  - Total: 2.53 km^{2} (0.98 sq mi)

Dimensions
  - Length: 2.19 km (1.36 mi)
  - Width: 1.90 km (1.18 mi)
- Time zone: UTC+5:30 (IST)
- Vehicle registration: AS - 01
- Website: gmc.assam.gov.in

A view of Chandmari, Guwahati.

Chandmari is one of the oldest localities of Guwahati, Assam, India. Situated towards the eastern side of the city, it is home to All India Radio, Guwahati centre and a couple of academic institutions such as Holy Childs Convent, Bhaskar Bidyapith Higher Secondary School, Gauhati Commerce College, and Assam Engineering Institute to name a few. Many high schools and degree colleges are set up in this area, adding to its educational atmosphere. This part of city is also known for its recreational facilities. Since 1961, the Bohag Bihu (Rongali Bihu) has been regularly organized at the A.E.I. playground which is also known as Chandmari Bihutoli by Pub Guwahati Bihu Sanmilan. Durga Puja is also regularly celebrated at Chandmari by the Chandmari Sarbajanin Durga Puja Committee. The neighboring residential areas around Chandmari are Milanpur, Krishnanagar, Nizarapar, Bamunimaidam, Kannachal, Pub-Sarania, Bhaskar Nagar etc. The area has one of the oldest movie theatres called the 'Anuradha' which shows both national and international movies.

== See also ==
- Patharquerry
- Rehabari
