= Dispur =

Locality in Guwahati city and Capital of Assam

Dispur Downtown
- Suburb, State capital city
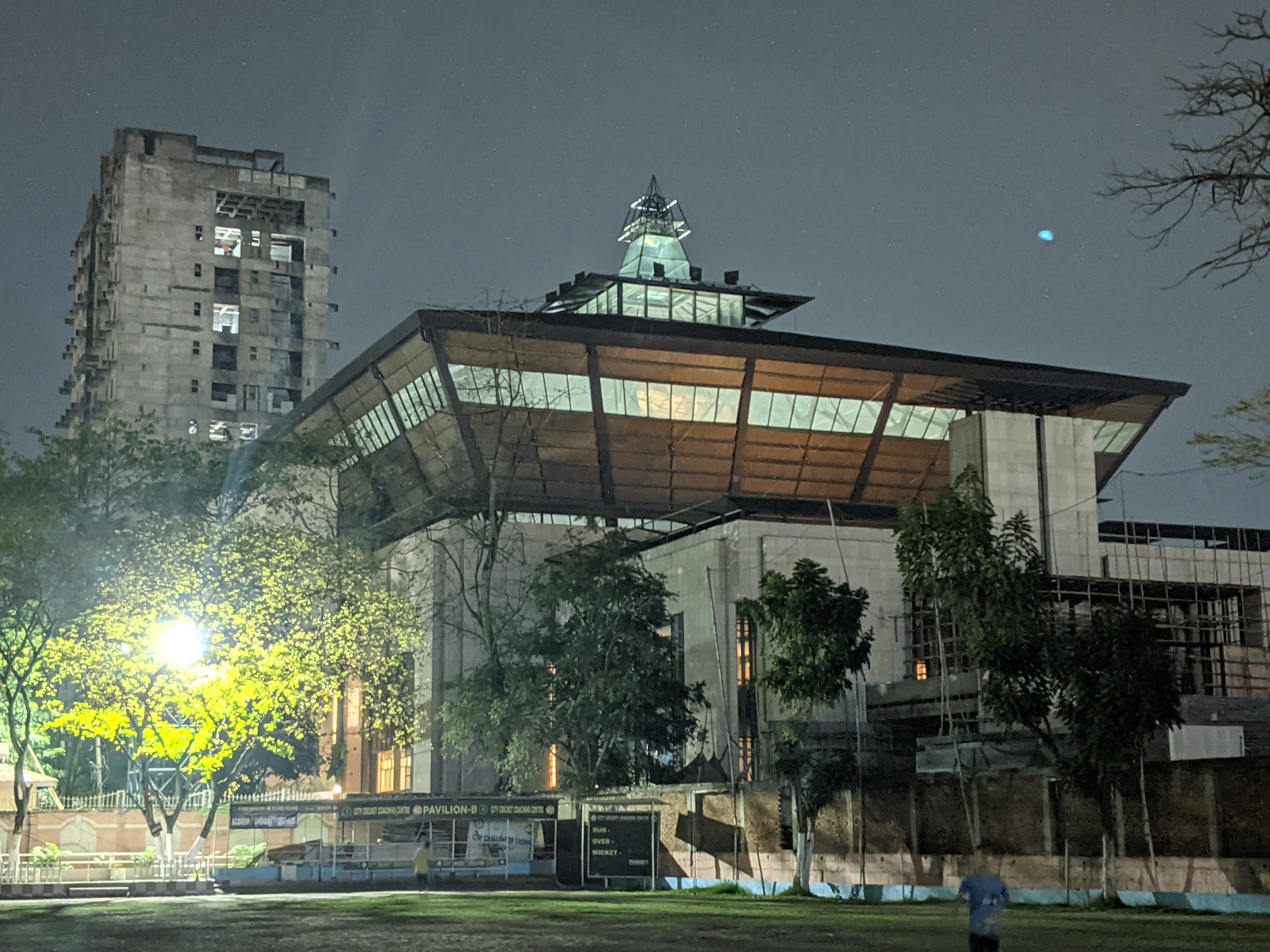
- Assam Legislative Assembly complex

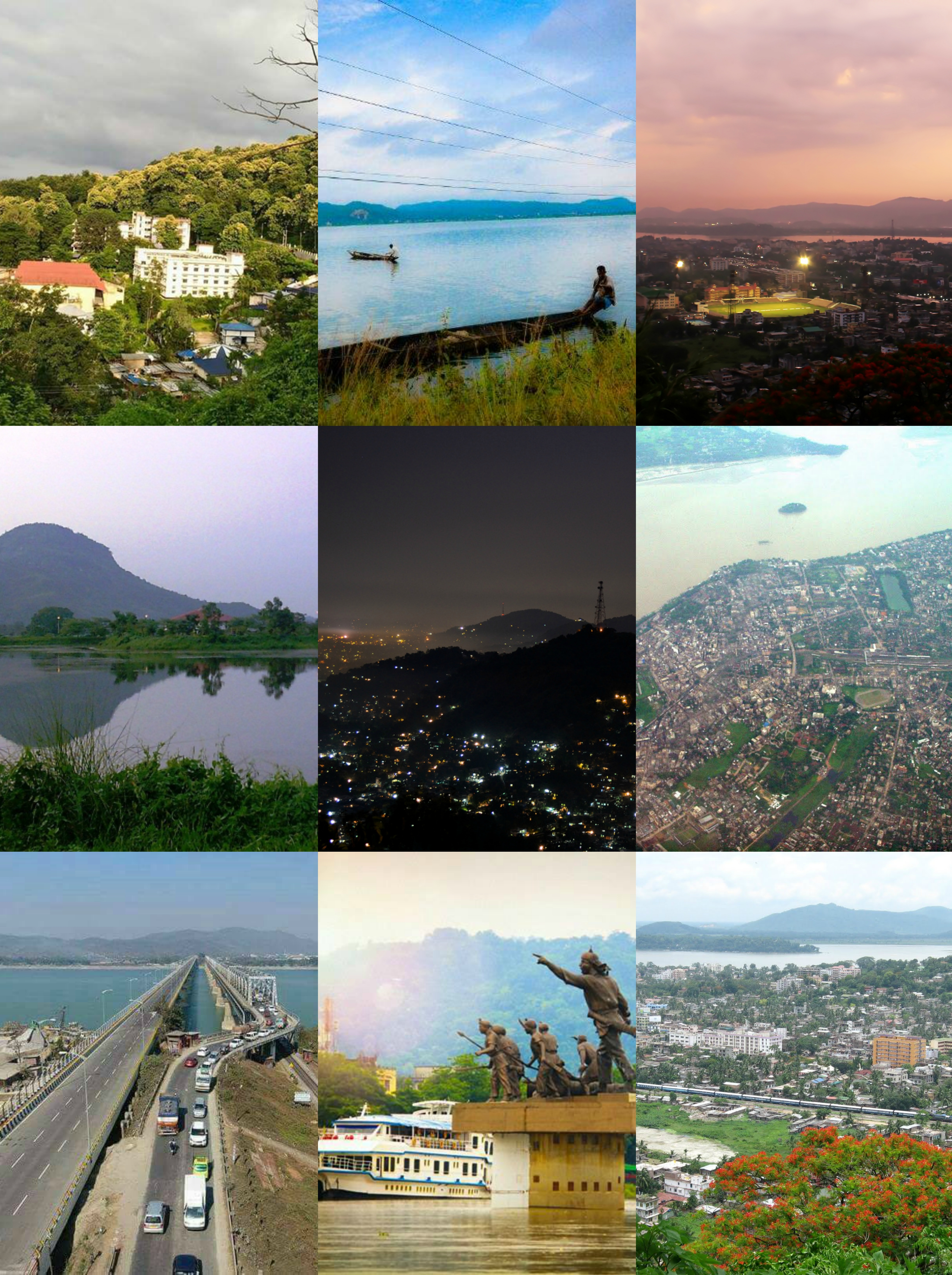
- Dispur View

- Location in Assam Dispur (India)
- Coordinates: 26°8′23″N 91°47′33″E
- Region: Northeast India
- State: Assam
- District: Kamrup Metropolitan

Government
  - Type: Mayor-Council
  - Body: Guwahati Municipal Corporation
  - Governor / Chancellor: Lakshman Acharya

Area
  - Total: 104.7 km^{2} (40.4 sq mi)
- Elevation: 55–290 m (180–951 ft)

Population (2025)
  - Total: 734,577
  - Density: 7,016/km^{2} (18,170/sq mi)

Language
  - Official: Assamese
- Time zone: UTC+5:30 (IST)
- PIN: 781005
- Telephone code: 91 - (0) 361 - XX XX XXX
- ISO 3166 code: IN-AS
- Vehicle registration: AS - 01
- Climate: Cwa

Dispur (/dɪsˈpʊər/, Assamese: [ˈdispuɹ]) is the capital of the Indian state of Assam and is a suburb of Guwahati.

It became the capital in 1973, when Shillong the erstwhile capital, became the capital of the state of Meghalaya that was carved out of Assam.

Dispur was a small village when it was made the capital of Assam. People from different parts of Assam migrated and settled in and around Dispur, quickly converting the rural area into a densely populated zone. As the year progressed, the city of Guwahati expanded, Dispur was integrated into the Greater Guwahati city.

Dispur is the seat of power of Government of Assam. The Assam Secretariat (Janata Bhawan) building is located in Dispur along with the Assam Legislative Assembly House, MLA Hostels and the State Emergency Operations Centre. The Assam Trunk road and the G S road pass through Dispur. To the south of Dispur lies the theologically important site of Basistha Ashram and the Shankardev Kalakshetra, a cultural centre created in the 1990s. Next to Dispur is the township of Jatia.

The Guwahati Tea Auction Centre, one of the busiest tea trading facilities in the world, is located in the city.

== Geography ==
The Bharalu river flows through the heart of the town.

=== Weather and Climate ===
Dispur, being a part of Guwahati, has warm summers and cold winters. Winters are also accompanied by occasional rainfalls that bring down the temperature further. Monsoon season in Dispur commences from the month of June. Dispur monsoons are usually accompanied by severe thunderstorms along with heavy downpours.

Climate data for Dispur
Month	Jan	Feb	Mar	Apr	May	Jun	Jul	Aug	Sep	Oct	Nov	Dec	Year
Mean daily maximum °C (°F)	22.3 (72.1)	25.2 (77.4)	29.1 (84.4)	29.6 (85.3)	29.6 (85.3)	29.8 (85.6)	29.8 (85.6)	30.1 (86.2)	29.5 (85.1)	28.3 (82.9)	26.0 (78.8)	23.3 (73.9)	27.7 (81.9)
Daily mean °C (°F)	16.8 (62.2)	19.4 (66.9)	23.3 (73.9)	24.8 (76.6)	25.7 (78.3)	26.7 (80.1)	26.9 (80.4)	27.0 (80.6)	26.3 (79.3)	24.5 (76.1)	21.2 (70.2)	18.1 (64.6)	23.4 (74.1)
Mean daily minimum °C (°F)	10.9 (51.6)	13.1 (55.6)	17.0 (62.6)	20.2 (68.4)	22.3 (72.1)	24.3 (75.7)	24.8 (76.6)	24.6 (76.3)	23.6 (74.5)	20.6 (69.1)	16.1 (61.0)	12.5 (54.5)	19.2 (66.5)
Average precipitation mm (inches)	13 (0.5)	26 (1.0)	68 (2.7)	179 (7.0)	323 (12.7)	551 (21.7)	690 (27.2)	618 (24.3)	398 (15.7)	141 (5.6)	21 (0.8)	10 (0.4)	3,038 (119.6)
Average rainy days	2	4	7	14	20	21	21	21	19	11	3	1	144
Average relative humidity (%)	72	65	56	71	82	87	89	88	87	83	76	74	78
Mean daily sunshine hours	7.5	8.8	9.5	7.9	7.8	7.9	8.2	8.3	8	8.2	8.3	7.6	8.2
Source: Climate data.org

== Politics ==
Dispur is part of Gauhati parliamentary constituency. BJP's Bijuli Kalita Medhi is the MP MLA of Dispur Assembly Constituency is Pradyut Bordoloi from BJP.

== Tourist attractions ==
Being the capital it is a well-planned locale. There are many tourist spots around Dispur, such as:

- Shilpagram is famous for cultural and handicraft heritage of Assam and other northeastern states. Ethnic jewellery, carpets, silk saris, wooden and metal handicrafts are available here among others.
- Basistha Ashram is six kilometres from Dispur. It is popular for a Lord Shiva temple. The temple spread across 835 bighas of land. It stands on the bank of mountain streams which originates from the hills of Meghalaya which in turn becomes river Basistha and Bharalu that flows through the city.
- Srimanta Sankaradeva Kalakshetra is a cultural institution located at the Panjabari area of the region. The museum preserves the culture and tradition of Assam as well as the Northeast. It is named after the great cultural exponent and scholar of Assam Mahapurush Srimanta Sankardeva. Inside the museum, there are traditional jewellery, costumes, statues, articles, weapons, stone and inscriptions displaying the culture of Assam and the rest of the northeastern region.

== Healthcare ==
Dispur is home to many hospitals and healthcare centres including Guwahati Neurological Research Centre (GNRC) Hospitals, Dispur Hospital, Dispur Polyclinic and Hospital and Capital State Dispensary.

== See also ==
- Tourism in North East India
- Beltola
- Paltan Bazaar
- Ganeshguri
- Chandmari
- Khanapara
- Dharapur
- Dispur (disambiguation)
