= Satyendranath =

Satyendranath is a given name. Notable people with the name include:

- Satyendranath Bose (1894–1974), Indian theoretical physicist and mathematician
- Satyendranath Bosu (1882–1908), Indian revolutionary
- Satyendranath Dutta (1882–1922), Indian poet and rhymer
- Satyendranath Sarma (1917 - 1999), Indian writer, educationalist, research scholar, critic and historian
- Satyendranath Tagore (1842–1923), Indian civil servant, poet, composer, writer, social reformer and linguist
