= Bhogamukh =

- Location within Assam Location within India
- Coordinates: 26.967°N 94.683°E
- Country: India
- State: Assam
- Districts: Jorhat; Sivasagar

Bhogamukh is located in Assam, India. It comes under two districts Jorhat and Sivasagar.

It is said by locals that the river Jhanji once change its route to Bhogamukh and the old village was badly devastated, after that the locals started calling this place as Bhogamukh because the meaning of Bhogamukh in Local Language (Assamese) was "A Place which is badly Destroyed".

There are about 4 schools in this village.
