= Gariyoshi =

Assamese language magazine

- Editor: Kuladhar Saikia
- Former editors: Late Chandra Prasad Saikia, Harekrishna Deka, Late Lakshmi Nandan Bora, Rita Chowdhury
- Categories: Literary Magazine
- Frequency: Monthly
- Founded: 1994
- Company: Sahitya-Prakash
- Country: India
- Based in: Tribune Buildings, Guwahati, Assam
- Language: Assamese
- ISSN: 2349-5324

Gariyoshi is an Assamese language monthly literary magazine published by the Sahitya-Prakash, Tribune Building, Guwahati.

== History ==
It was founded by Chandra Prasad Saikia, who was also the first editor. The magazine is published monthly. Goriyoshi is instrumental in nurturing and projecting several talented short story writers and poets including Dhanada Debi, Jayanta Kumar Chakraborty, Arnab Jan Deka, Manikuntala Bhattacharya, Birinchi Kumar Rabha, Jiban Narah, Neelim Kumar and others. The magazine also collaborated with the Katha International Short Story Festival in 2004 in creating the All-India Katha-Goriyoshi Awards for best Assamese short stories. Dhrubajyoti Sarma, Arnab Jan Deka and Ratna Bharali Talukdar were the recipients of those awards, whose short stories were translated into English and read over in the presence of an international galaxy of story writers and literary critics at Katha International Short Story Festival 2004.
