= List of state and union territory capitals in India =

India is a federal constitutional republic governed under a parliamentary system consisting of 28 states and 8 union territories. All states, as well as the union territories of Jammu and Kashmir, Puducherry and the National Capital Territory of Delhi, have elected legislatures and governments, both patterned on the Westminster model. The remaining five union territories are directly ruled by the central government through appointed administrators. In 1956, under the States Reorganisation Act, states were reorganised on a linguistic basis. Their structure has since remained largely unchanged. Each state or union territory is further divided into administrative districts.

The legislatures of three states Himachal Pradesh, Maharashtra and Uttarakhand meet in different capitals for their summer and winter sessions. Ladakh has both Leh and Kargil as its administrative capitals.

== List ==
The state and union territory capitals are sorted according to administrative, legislative and judicial capitals. The administrative capital is where the executive government offices are located. The legislative capital is where the legislative assembly is located and the judicial capital is where the states or union territories' high courts are located.

=== States ===
State	Administrative/ Executive capital	Legislative capital	Judicial capital	Year of establishment	Former capital
Andhra Pradesh	Amaravati	Amaravati	Amaravati	2014	Hyderabad (Note: Hyderabad was the de jure joint capital of Andhra Pradesh and Telangana until 2024.) (1956–2014)
Arunachal Pradesh	Itanagar	Itanagar	Guwahati	1987	—
Assam	Dispur	Dispur	Guwahati	1972	Shillong (Note: Shillong was the joint capital of Assam and Meghalaya until 1972.) (1950–1972)
Bihar	Patna	Patna	Patna	1950	—
Chhattisgarh	Raipur (Note: Naya Raipur is planned to replace Raipur as the capital city of Chhattisgarh.)	Raipur	Bilaspur	2000	—
Goa	Panaji (Note: Panaji was the capital of Goa from 1843 when it was ruled by the Portuguese.)	Porvorim	Mumbai	1987	—
Gujarat	Gandhinagar	Gandhinagar	Ahmedabad	1960	Ahmedabad (1960–1970)
Haryana	Chandigarh	Chandigarh	Chandigarh	1966	—
Himachal Pradesh	Shimla	Shimla (Summer); Dharamshala (Winter)	Shimla	1971	—
Jharkhand	Ranchi	Ranchi	Ranchi	2000	—
Karnataka	Bengaluru	Bengaluru	Bengaluru	1956	—
Kerala	Thiruvananthapuram	Thiruvananthapuram	Kochi	1956	—
Madhya Pradesh	Bhopal	Bhopal	Jabalpur	1956	—
Maharashtra	Mumbai (Note: Mumbai (Bombay) was the capital of Bombay Presidency which was a province until 1950. After that Bombay became the capital of Bombay State. Subsequently, Bombay State was split into Gujarat and Maharashtra in 1960.)	Mumbai (Summer); Nagpur (Winter)	Mumbai	1960	—
Manipur	Imphal	Imphal	Imphal	1972	—
Meghalaya	Shillong	Shillong	Shillong	1972	—
Mizoram	Aizawl	Aizawl	Guwahati	1987	—
Nagaland	Kohima	Kohima	Guwahati	1963	—
Odisha	Bhubaneswar	Bhubaneswar	Cuttack	1950	—
Punjab	Chandigarh	Chandigarh	Chandigarh	1966	—
Rajasthan	Jaipur	Jaipur	Jodhpur	1950	—
Sikkim	Gangtok (Note: Gangtok has been the capital of Sikkim since 1890. Kingdom of Sikkim joined the Indian Union in 1975.)	Gangtok	Gangtok	1975	—
Tamil Nadu	Chennai (Note: Chennai (Madras) was the capital of the Madras Presidency since 1839, which was redrawn as Madras State in 1956. Madras State was renamed Tamil Nadu in 1968.)	Chennai	Chennai	1956	—
Telangana	Hyderabad	Hyderabad	Hyderabad	2014	—
Tripura	Agartala	Agartala	Agartala	1972	—
Uttar Pradesh	Lucknow	Lucknow	Prayagraj	1950	—
Uttarakhand	Dehradun	Bhararisain (summer); Dehradun (winter)	Nainital	2000	—
West Bengal	Kolkata	Kolkata	Kolkata	1950	—

=== Union territories ===
Union Territory	Administrative/ Executive capital	Legislative capital	Judicial capital	Year of establishment
Andaman and Nicobar Islands	Port Blair	–	Kolkata	1956
Chandigarh	Chandigarh	–	Chandigarh	1966
Dadra and Nagar Haveli and Daman and Diu	Daman	–	Mumbai	2020
Jammu and Kashmir	Srinagar (summer); Jammu (winter)	Srinagar (summer); Jammu (winter)	Srinagar (summer); Jammu (winter)	2019
Ladakh	Leh Kargil (Joint capital)	–	Srinagar (summer); Jammu (winter)	2019
Lakshadweep	Kavaratti	–	Kochi	1956
Delhi	New Delhi	New Delhi	New Delhi	1956
Puducherry	Pondicherry	Pondicherry	Chennai	1951
