= Jalukgaon =

Jalukgaon (or Jaluk gaon) is a small village in the Amguri town in the Sivasagar District of Assam, India. It is two kilometres (1.2 miles) away from the Jhanji road (37 NO National Highway). There are 114 households in this village and a total population of 456, out of which 234 are female and 222 male.

The literacy rate of this village is adequate. There is a L.P. School (Lt. Bholanath Saikia L.P. School), a namghar in the midst of the village. The youths of this village took the initiative to build a rural library, under the leadership of Champok Kumar Dutta, who is a higher educated person of the village. As of 2011, the library, known as "PRAGATI PUTHIBHARAL", is under construction.

== History ==
Jalukgoan was named after the Assamese word for black pepper. At one point, it held a primary role in pepper cultivation in the region.

== People from Jaluk goan ==
- Chandraprasad Saikia was born in this village
- Assamese cricketer Gautam Dutta's father
