= Chandra Prasad Saikia =

Writer from Assam, India

- Born: 8 July 1927; Jalukgaon, Jhanji, Sivasagar district, Assam
- Died: 8 August 2006 (aged 79)
- Education: Presidency College, Kolkata
- Occupations: Writer, Editor & Publisher
- Children: Three
- Writing career
- Language: Assamese
- Notable awards: Assam Valley Literary Award; Sahitya Akademi Award; Padma Bhushan

Chandra Prasad Saikia (1927–2006) was a writer from Assam, India. He was the president of the Asam Sahitya Sabha held at Hajo and Jorhat district, Assam in 1999 and 2000, respectively. Saikia was born on 8 July 1927 in Jalukgaon, Jhanji in Sivasagar district, Assam. After having primary education in Sivasagar he had left for Kolkata for higher education.

== Literacy works ==
Novels

- Edin
- Meghamallar
- Uttarkal
- Suryasnan
- Mandakranta
- Janmantar
- Maharathi
- Tore More Alokare Yatra

Short story collections

- Mayamriga
- Nachpati Phool
- Chakrabat
- Angikar
- Chandra Prasad Saikiar Nirbachita Galpa

Miscellaneous

- Dristikon
- Nirbachita Sampadakiya
- Americar Chithi

Saikia was also editor of various journals and newspapers, including Goriyoshi, The Assam Tribune, Prakash, Natun Dainik, and Asom Batori.

== Awards and honours ==
- Assam Valley Literary Award
- Sahitya Akademi Award
- Padma Bhushan (2007)
- Publication Board Award (2000).

== See also ==
- Assamese literature
- History of Assamese literature
- List of Asam Sahitya Sabha presidents
- List of Assamese writers with their pen names
