= Dispur (disambiguation) =

Dispur is a locality in the city and of Guwahati, Assam and is the capital of Assam.

Dispur may also refer to:

• Dispur Assembly Constituency, the Legislative Assembly Constituency for Dispur

• Dispur Law College, Law College in Assam
