= Jatia =

- Neighbourhood
- Location within Guwahati Location within Assam
- Coordinates: 26.144257°N 91.77875°E
- Country: India
- State: Assam
- District: Kamrup Metropolitan district

Languages
  - Official: Assamese
- Time zone: UTC+5:30 (IST)
- Vehicle registration: AS

Jatia is a locality in the city of Guwahati. It is speculated to be the ancient capital of Assam, known under the name of Pragjyotishpura.

The locality is a suburb of Guwahati, though it is claimed that the name Jatia itself is the remnant of archaic name pragjyotisha pura. It is a high-traffic area besides the G.S. Road along with Ganeshguri, Tarun Nagar, Jyotikuchi and Ghoramara areas.

Famous residents of Jatia include late Padum Barua (maker of the Assamese realist film Ganga Silonir Pakhi), Kanak Sen Deka (editor of the Assamese Newspaper Agradoot), Ratna Singha (First Manipuri woman Superintendent of Police).

The Dispur Manipuri Nupi Marup is headquartered in Jatia. Bemarai Singha is the president of the non-governmental organisation which is involved in pioneering work for Manipuri women.

Jatia is a low lying area which was affected by flooding after heavy rains in June 2025.

Jatia LPS is well known school in the area.
