= Basistha Temple =

Basishta Temple
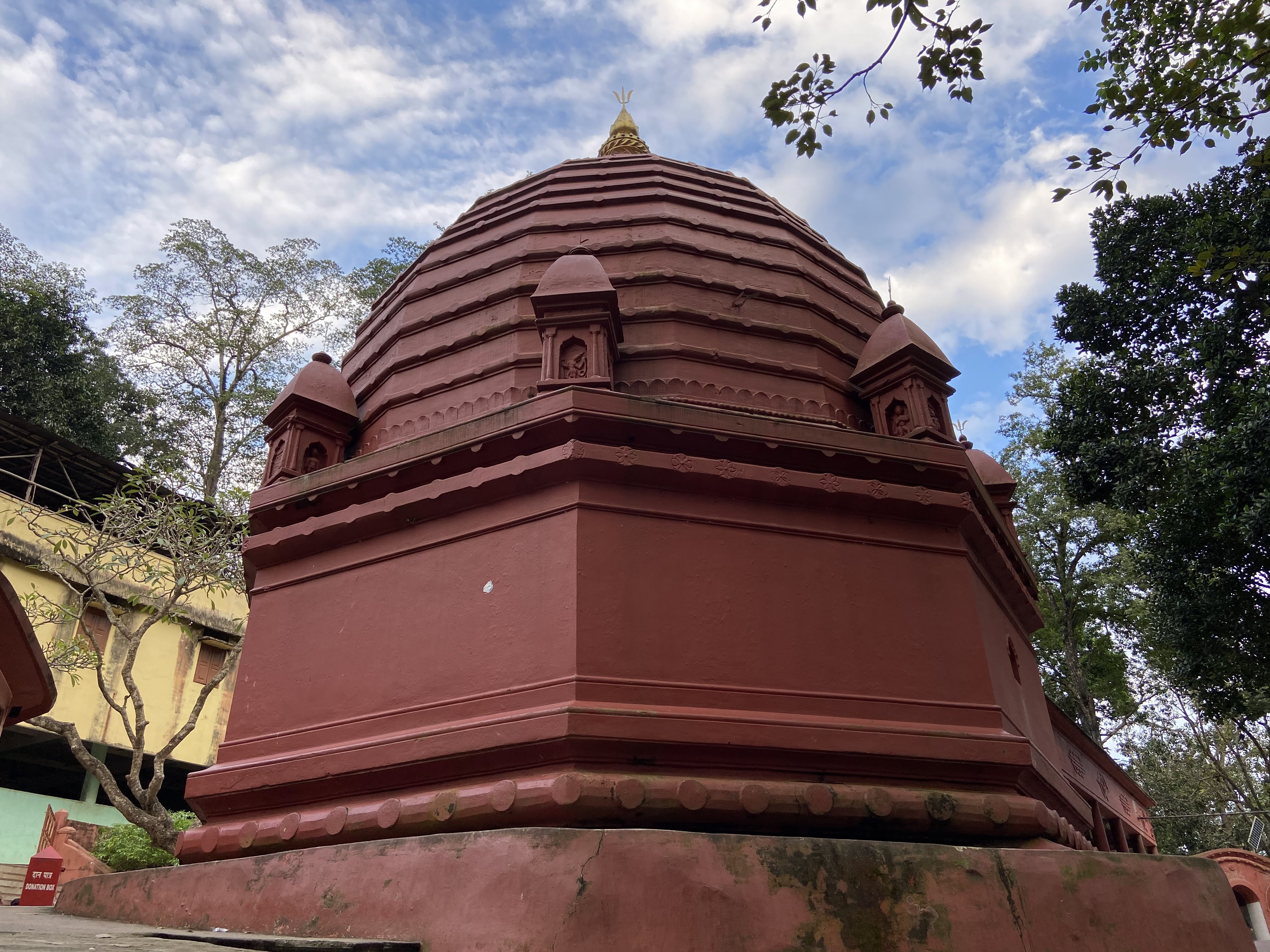
- Basistha Mandir

Religion
- Affiliation: Hinduism
- District: Guwahati
- Deity: Shiva

Location
- State: Assam
- Interactive map of Basishta Temple
- Coordinates: 26°05′42″N 91°47′04″E

Architecture
- Type: Nilachal architecture
- Creator: Rajeswar Singha
- Completed: 1764; 262 years ago

Basistha temple (/bəˈsɪsθə/) is a Shiva mandir located in the south-east corner of Guwahati city, Assam, India.

The Temple in the ashram stands on the bank of the three mythical mountain streams—Sandhya, Lalita, Kanta—originating from the hills of Meghalaya, which becomes the rivers Basistha and Bahini/Bharalu flowing through the city.

== Basisthashram ==
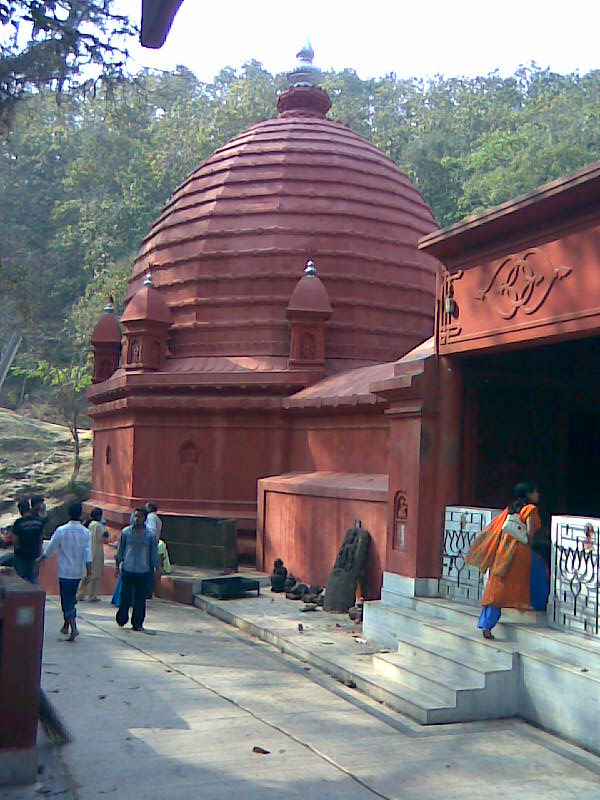
Basistha Temple, Guwahati

This ashram is believed to be the home of sage Basistha. The ashram is located a few kilometers (10–12) from Guwahati, on the outskirts of Garbhanga reserve forest which has a population of elephants. This Garbhanga reserve forest is also a proposed butterfly reserve. Although the ashram has a temple but still the cave in which the Muni Vasistha is believed to have meditated is located 5 km inside the ashram. The ashram also has a waterfall.

== History ==
The site has evidence of a stone temple which once stood at this spot around 1000–1100 CE. A brick temple was built in mid 18th Century upon the remains of the stone temple of an earlier period. It is an octagonal shaped temple at the base with a polygonal sikhara over it. The temple has a sunken garbhagriha which is believed to have the foot impression of the sage Vasistha, who is believed to have had his asrama in this area in the remote past. The existing octagonal brick temple was built by Ahom king Swargadeo Rajeswar Singha during his period of reign from 1751 to 1769.
