= Lakshmi Nandan Bora =

Indian writer (1932–2021)

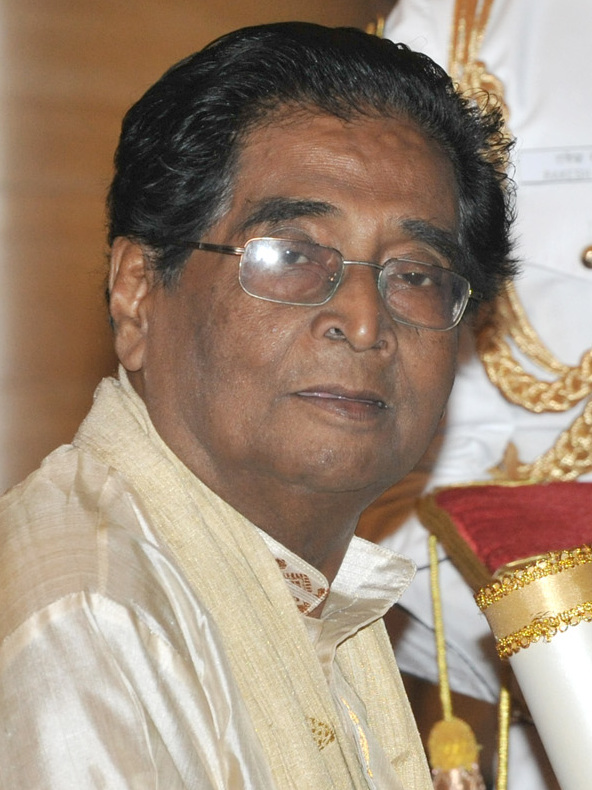
- Born: 15 June 1932; Kujidah, Nagaon district, Assam, India
- Died: 3 June 2021 (aged 88); Guwahati, Assam, India
- Occupations: Writer and scientist
- Years active: 1954–2021
- Known for: Novels, Short Stories
- Spouse: Madhuri
- Children: Seuji; Tridib Nandan; Swaroop Nandan
- Parent(s): Phuleswar Bora; Phuleswari
- Awards: Padma Shri; Sahitya Academy Award; Saraswati Samman; Publication Board Assam Lifetime Achievement Award; Assam Valley Literary Award; Bharatiya Bhasha Parishad Rachna Samagra Award

Lakshmi Nandan Bora (15 June 1932 – 3 June 2021) was an Indian novelist and short story writer in the Assamese language, known for over 60 books he has authored, including award winning novels, Patal Bhairavi and Kayakalpa. A recipient of Sahitya Academy Award and Saraswati Samman, Bora was honoured by the Government of India in 2015 with Padma Shri, the fourth highest Indian civilian award. He died on 3 June 2021, from complications caused by COVID-19.

== Biography ==
Except for one novel, I had written all my other novels after my marriage, says Lakshmi Nandan Bora.

Lakshmi Nandan Bora was born on 15 June 1932 at Hatichung of Kudijah village, a small hamlet in Nagaon district in the Northeast Indian state of Assam to Phuleswar Bora and Phuleswari as the youngest of their five children. His parents died while he was in his teens and he was brought up by his eldest brother, Kamal Chandra Bora. He did his schooling at Nagaon High School, graduated in Physics (BSc) from Cotton College State University, Guwahati and secured his master's degree (MSc) from Presidency College, Kolkata. He pursued doctoral studies in meteorology at Andhra University from where he secured a PhD, the first person to be awarded a doctoral degree in meteorology by the university. For most of his career he worked at Assam Agricultural University, Jorhat as a faculty member and stayed with the institution till his retirement as a professor and the head of the department of physics and agrometeorology in 1992. He has also served as a visiting professor at the Johannes Gutenberg University for two terms. Bora married Madhuri in 1961 and the couple has one daughter Seuji and two sons Tridib Nandan and Swaroop Nandan. The family lives in Ganeshguri, a satellite town of Guwahati, Assam. Seuji Bora Neog is a Professor of Genetics and Plantbreeding at Assam Agricultural University, Jorhat, Tridib Nandan Bora is a Senior State Government Official while the youngest son Swaroop Nandan is a Professor of Mathematics at Indian Institute of Technology Guwahati. Lakshmi Nandan Borah died on 3 June 2021 at the age of 88.

== Literary and social career ==
Bora wrote his first short story, Bhaona, in 1954, which was published in Assamese magazine, Ramdhenu. His first book, Dristirupa was published in 1958 and the next one, Nishar Purabhi in 1962. He published his first novel, Gonga Silonir Pakhi, in 1963, which is reported to have earned critical acclaim, has been translated into 11 languages and was made into a film, under the same name, by Padum Baruah in 1976. The succeeding years saw him active in the political milieu of Assam and was arrested once, in 1981, under the National Security Act. His novel, Akou Saraighat, written during this time and published in 1980, reflects his political leanings to a certain measure. He also founded a weekly, Rangpur, and stayed as its editor till 1996 when he resigned from the post, reportedly due to ideological differences with the owner of the publication.

Two more novels, Matit Meghar Chaan (1970) and Bishesh Eraati (1979) and a short story anthology, Sehi Anuraga (1983) followed before he published his novel, Patal Bhairavi in 1986 which won the Sahitya Academy Award in 1988. Two novels were published next, Kal Dingare Pal in 1988 and Matsya Kanya in 1995 followed by Preyashi (1996 - short story anthology), Jaa Keri Naahike Upaam and Sehi Gunanidhi (1997 - novel), the latter two inspired by the lives of Sankardev and his disciple, Madhavdev, renowned Assamese saint-scholars. In 2008, he published Kayakalpa, which won the Saraswati Samman from K. K. Birla Foundation. The work has since been translated into 22 Indian languages as well as into English by Biman Arandhara.

Lakshmi Nandan Bora has written a number of plays and books on agriculture and environment, taking his publications to a total of 60 books, composed of twenty nine novels and twenty six short story anthologies. His short stories, 75 selected ones, have been compiled under the name, Lakshminandan Borar Charita Dasakar Galpa Samagra. His published autobiography Kal Balukat Khoj was also serialized in the Assamese fortnightly, Prantik. His other current projects are two books, one on Hem Chandra Baruah, renowned lexicographer and social reformer and the other, on Lakshminath Bezbaroa, a known Assamese literary figure.

He has served as the president of Assam Sahitya Sabha (1996–97) and as a member of the Planning Commission of Assam. He has also been the chairman of the Assam Pollution Control Board during the period 1997 - 2003 and served as the editor of Goriyoshi, an Assamese monthly literary magazine.

== Bibliography ==
Some of the selected publications of Bora are:

- Sei Surey Utola[1960] --Story
- Kashiyolir Kuwoli[1961]--Story
- Gopon Godhuli[1961]--Story
- Gouri Ruupok[1961]--Story
- Mon Mati Megh[1962]--Story
- Ashiin Koina[1963]--Story
- Aei Roop Aei Chanda[1963]--Story
- Dahan Dulori[1965]--Story
- Kothin Maya[1966]--Story
- Debotar Byadhi[1966]--Story
- Majot Trisharey Noi[1967—Story
- Byotikrom[1976]--Story
- Nishiddha Chetona[1976]--Story
- Arabarir Lecheri[1983]--Story
- Doostor Karagar[2002]--Story
- Preyoshi[1993]--Anthology
- Mon Birikhor Jokh[2001]--Story
- Mukta Poorush[2002]--Story
- Mon Mati Piriti[1962]--Story
- Aalakh Khorikajai[2006]--Story
- Basonti Bashona[2017]--Story
- Saa Jueir Pohorot[1966]--Novel
- Shikhar Surobhi[1968]--Novel
- Meghali Doopor[1968]--Novel
- Bolookat Bijuli[1969]--Novel
- Amtit Meghor Saa[1970]--Novel
- Uttor Poorush[1970]--Novel
- Poton[1979]--Novel
- Radhikaput Aruu Malakhsmi Niketan[1982]--Novel
- Ghatok Polatok[1985]--Novel
- Protirodh[1987]--Novel
- Biponna Bismoi[1988]--Novel
- Ganeshguri[1988]--Novel
- Nayak Adhinayak[1992]--Novel
- Hiyat Tirebirai[1993]--Novel
- Meghot Madol Baje[1999]--Novel
- Shoturongo[2003]--Novel
- Tejoshini[2003]--Novel
- Goti Moti Bhokoti[2005]--Novel
- Shehi Shobyoshashi[2014]--Novel
- Pochimor Pom Khedi[1991]--Travelogue
- Joraloga Germany[1993]--Travelogue
- Shimar Poridhi Bhangi[1997]--Travelogue
- Shipurir Achoni[1961]--Drama
- Akanko Jugol[1972]--Drama
- Swamy Bibekananda[1997]--Biography
- Sonkordev:Ati Mohajibon[1999]--Biography
- Mahapoorush Madhabdeb[1999]--Biography
- Kal Bolukat Khoj[2010]--Autobiography
- Dristirupa (1958) - anthology
- Nishar Purabi (1962) - anthology
- Gonga Silonir Pakhi (1963) - novel
- Aabesh Indrajal (1967) - anthology
- Matit Meghar Chaan (1970) - anthology
- Bishesh Eraati (1979) - novel
- Akou Saraighat (1980) - novel
- Jaa Keri Naahike Upaam
- Sehi Anuraga (1983) - anthology
- Patal Bhairavi (1986) - novel
- Kal Dingarare Pal (1988) - novel
- Matsya Kanya (1995) - novel
- Preyashi (1996) - anthology
- Sehi Gunanidhi (1997) - novel
- Ganga Cheel Ke Pankh (2003) - novel
- Kayakalpa (2008) - novel
- Lakshminandan Borar Charita Dasakar Galpa Samagra — short story anthology

== Awards and recognitions ==
Bora received the Sahitya Academy Award in 1988 for his novel, Patal Bhairavi and the Assam Valley Literary Award in 2004. His novel, Kayakalpa fetched him the Saraswati Samman instituted by the K. K. Birla Foundation in 2008 and in 2012, Assam Publication Board honoured him with the Lifetime Achievement Award. The Government of India included him for the Republic Day honours list, in 2015, for the civilian honour of Padma Shri.

== See also ==
- Gonga Silonir Pakhi
- Assam Agricultural University
- Goriyoshi
- Hem Chandra Baruah
- Lakshminath Bezbaroa
- Sankardev
- Madhavdev
