= Bhimeswar Dham =

Holy site in Assam, India

Bhimeswar dham
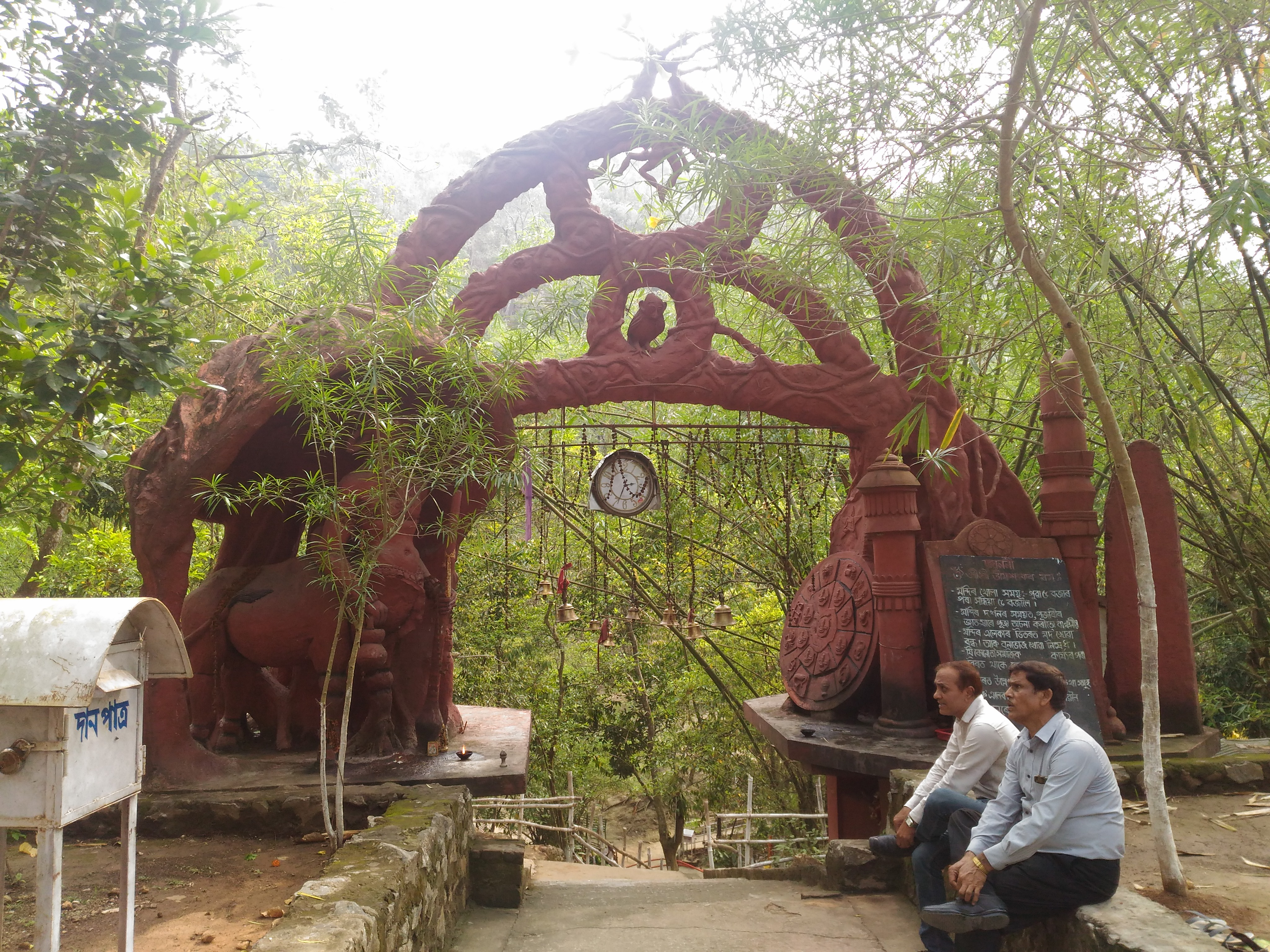
- Main entry to Bhimeswar dham

- Location in Guwahati Location in Assam

Religion
- Affiliation: Hinduism
- District: Kamrup
- Deity: Lord Shiva
- Festival: Shivaratri

Location
- Location: Dakini Pahar, Guwahati
- State: Assam
- Country: India
- Interactive map of Bhimeswar dham
- Coordinates: 26.0971°N 91.6961°E

Bhimeswar Dham, is a Hindu temple, located at Dakini hill (also known as Daini pahar) near Pamohi in Guwahati, Assam, India. It is situated at the hill just besides the Deepor Beel. It is believed that Shiva had incarnated here to destroy a demon called Bhimasura and protect his devotees.

The exact location of Dakini is a debated subject. The Shiva Purana and the Koti Rudra Samhita refer to Bhimashankar Jyotirlinga on Dakini hill. Bhimeswar dham at Pamohi is interpreted by the devotees to be the same Dwadas Jyotirlinga. Bhimashankar dham of Pune is also referred by some people as the Dwadas Jyotirlinga.

There is no temple here. Instead there is a hill stream surrounding a linga and one can observe continuous water flowing over the linga. There is also a temple dedicated to Ganesha on the halfway to this dham. The road leading to the linga is very beautiful with hills, streams and bamboo grooves.

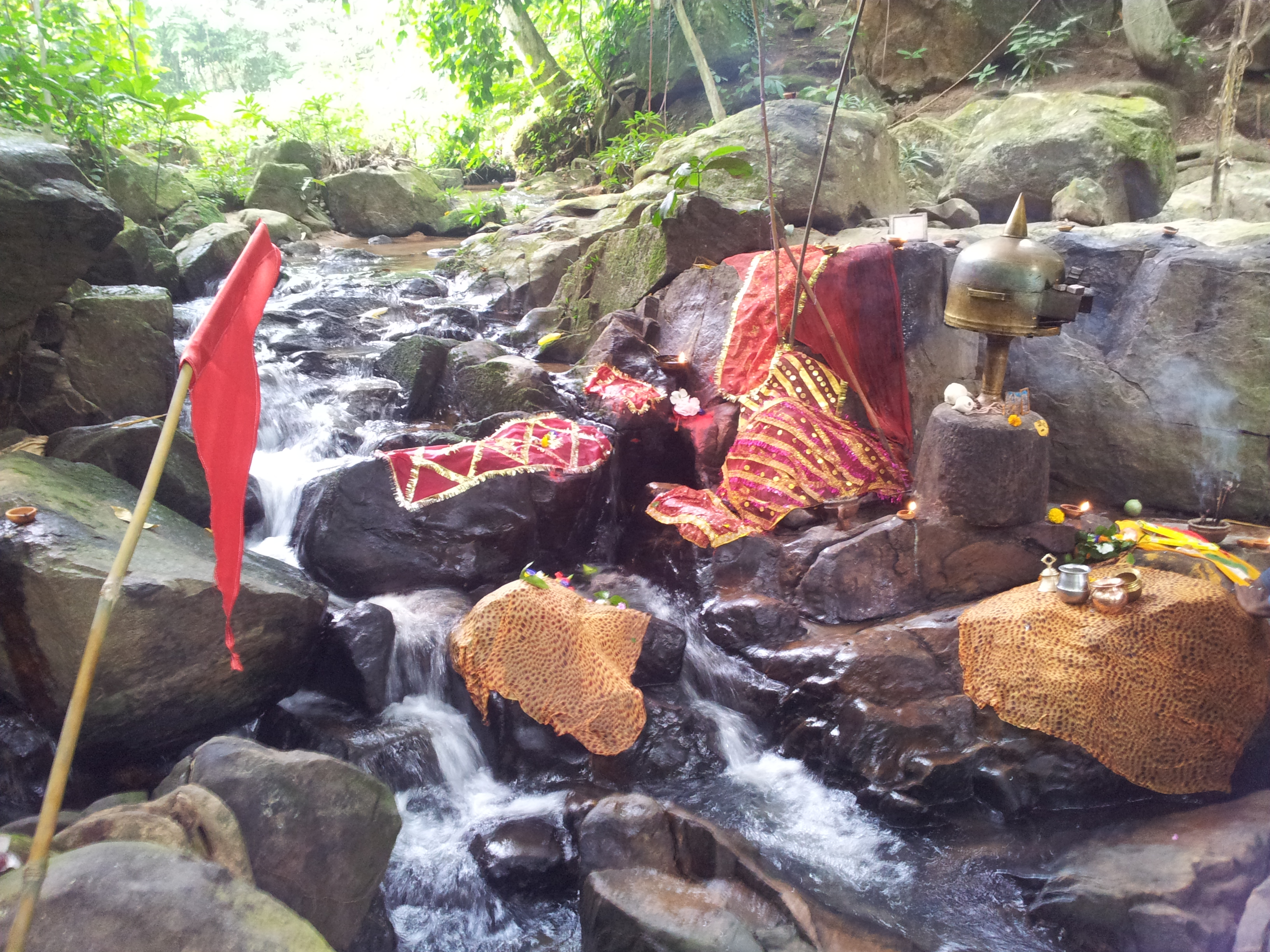
Jyotirlinga and the hill stream at the Bhimeswar dham.

== Legend ==
According to Shiva Purana, Kumbhakarna (brother of Lanka king Ravana) was in love with Karkati, daughter of the king of Patal Lok. When Ravana came to invite Karkati's father and Kumbhakarna to fight with Rama, Kumbhakarna refused to come until Ravana allowed him to marry Karkati. At last on the advice of Narada, Ravana agreed and Kumbhakarna married Karkati. After marriage Kumbhakarna left Karkati to participate in the war.

After Kumbhakarna's death, Karkati gave birth to Kumbhakarna's son; who was named as Bhimasura. Bhimasura did penance to receive a boon from Brahma of immense strength and to be not killed by Vishnu by any means. He later challenged Vishnu to fight with him. Vishnu agreed and deliberately lost the war to keep Brahma's boon. This made Bhimasura very arrogant and he started conquering various kingdoms. He imprisoned the king Priyadharman (also called Kamrupeshwar) and his wife Dakshinadevi of Kamrupa.

King Priyadharman and his wife were worshiping Shiva even in prison. When Bhimasura sent his army to stop the king from worshiping, they were destroyed by rage of Shiva. Bhimasura wanted to kill king Kamrupeshwar. When Bhimasura attacked the king was busy in worship at this place, his sword fell on the linga instead of the king. Instantly Shiva appeared and killed Bhimasura. The sweat from Lord Shiva's body formed a river, said to be the same steam which is running over the Jyotirlinga now. The place where the king worshiped Shiva was named after this episode as Bhimeswar. On the request of the gods, sages and devotees, Shiva agreed to reside there eternally by the name of Bhimashankar.

== Access ==
It is around 13 km from Guwahati. One has to go to Pamohi from NH 37 in Guwahati to reach Bhimeswar. The area is accessible by trekkers and cars from Gorchuk. . Guwahati is well connected with other parts of the country by road, rail and air. Members of the Brahmon Sobha, a registered global society, perform "Rudra Yagna" and "Rudravishek Paath" on the occasion of Maha Shivaratri. The Assam State Transport Corporation ply buses to carry devotees to the shrine from Gorchuk at regular intervals.

== Gallery ==
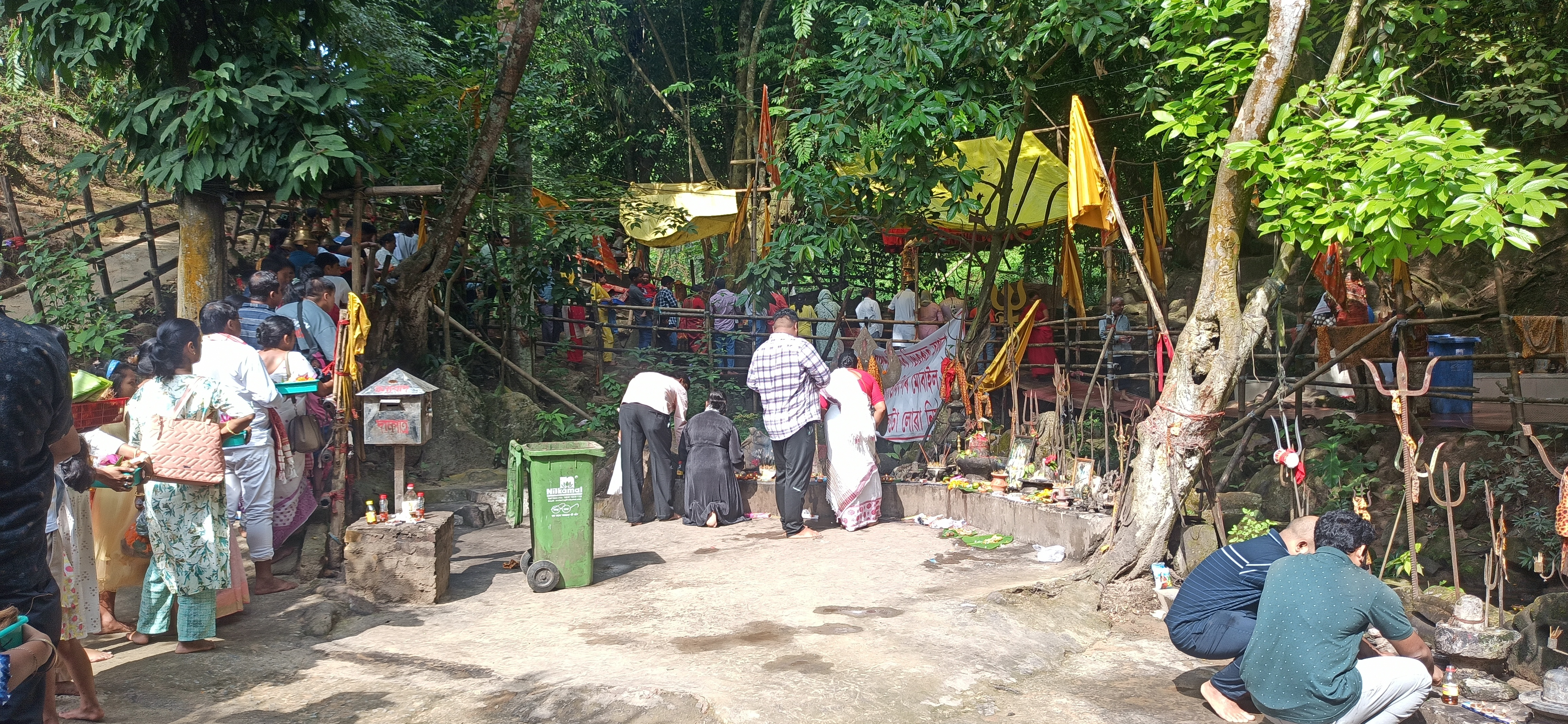
Devotees at dham

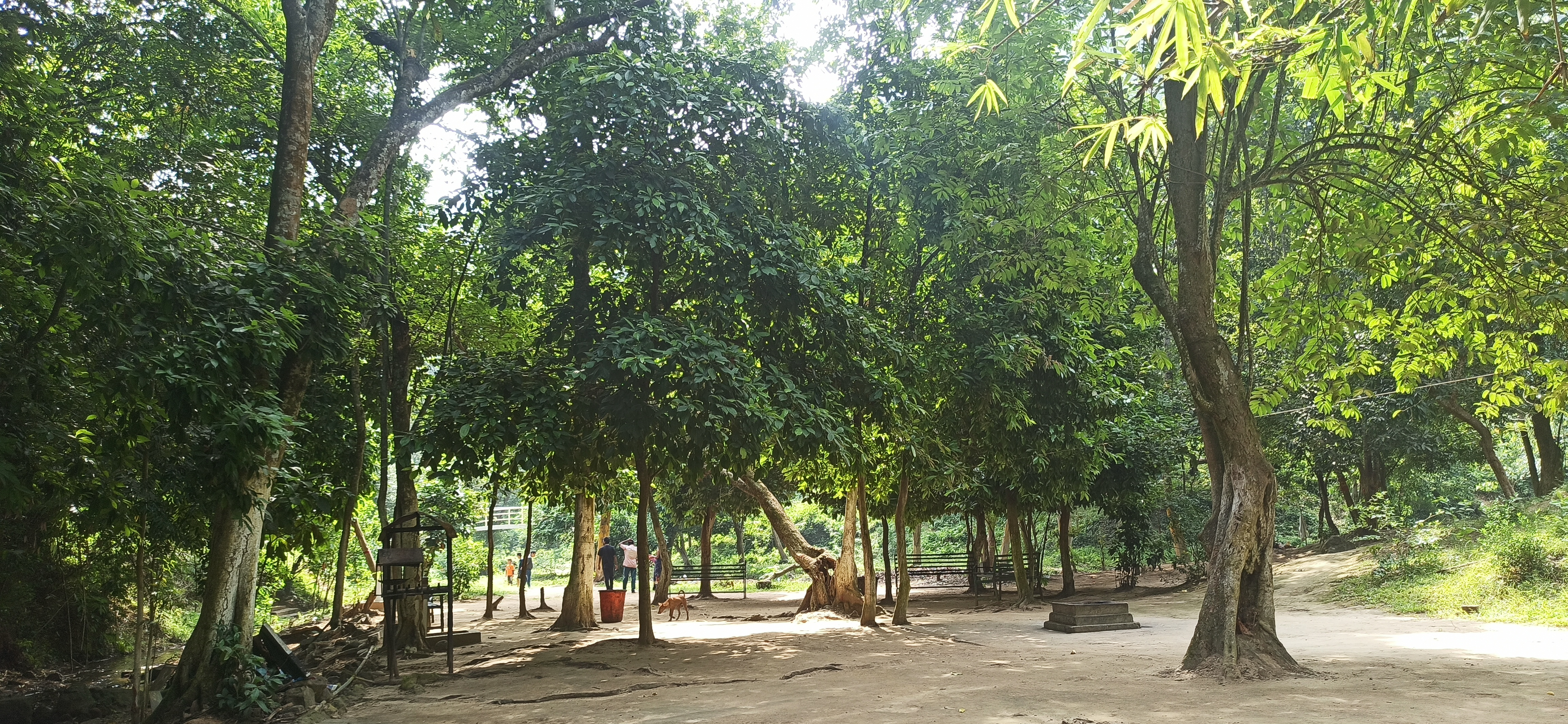
Natural ambience at the dham

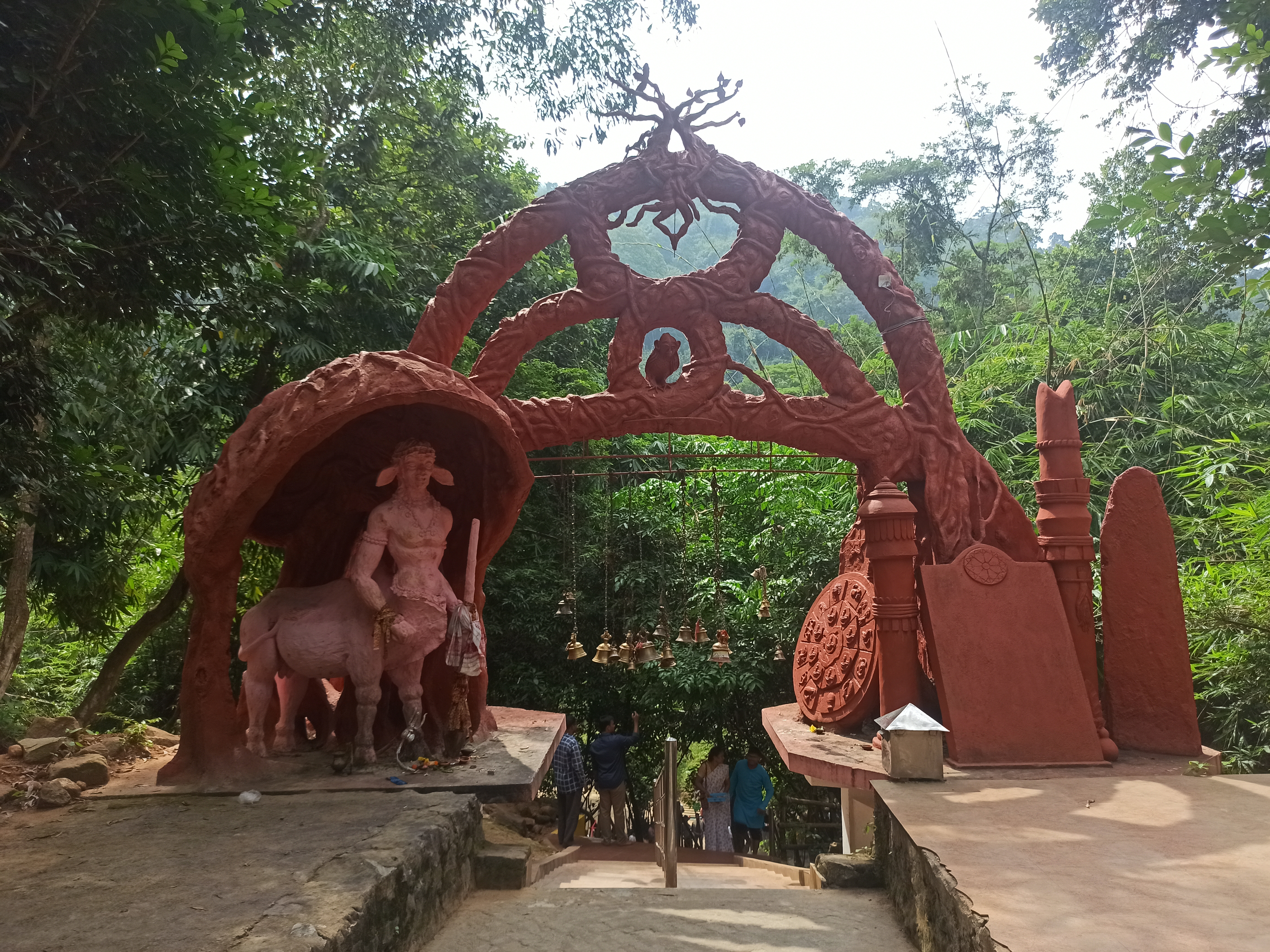
Main entrance of the Dham

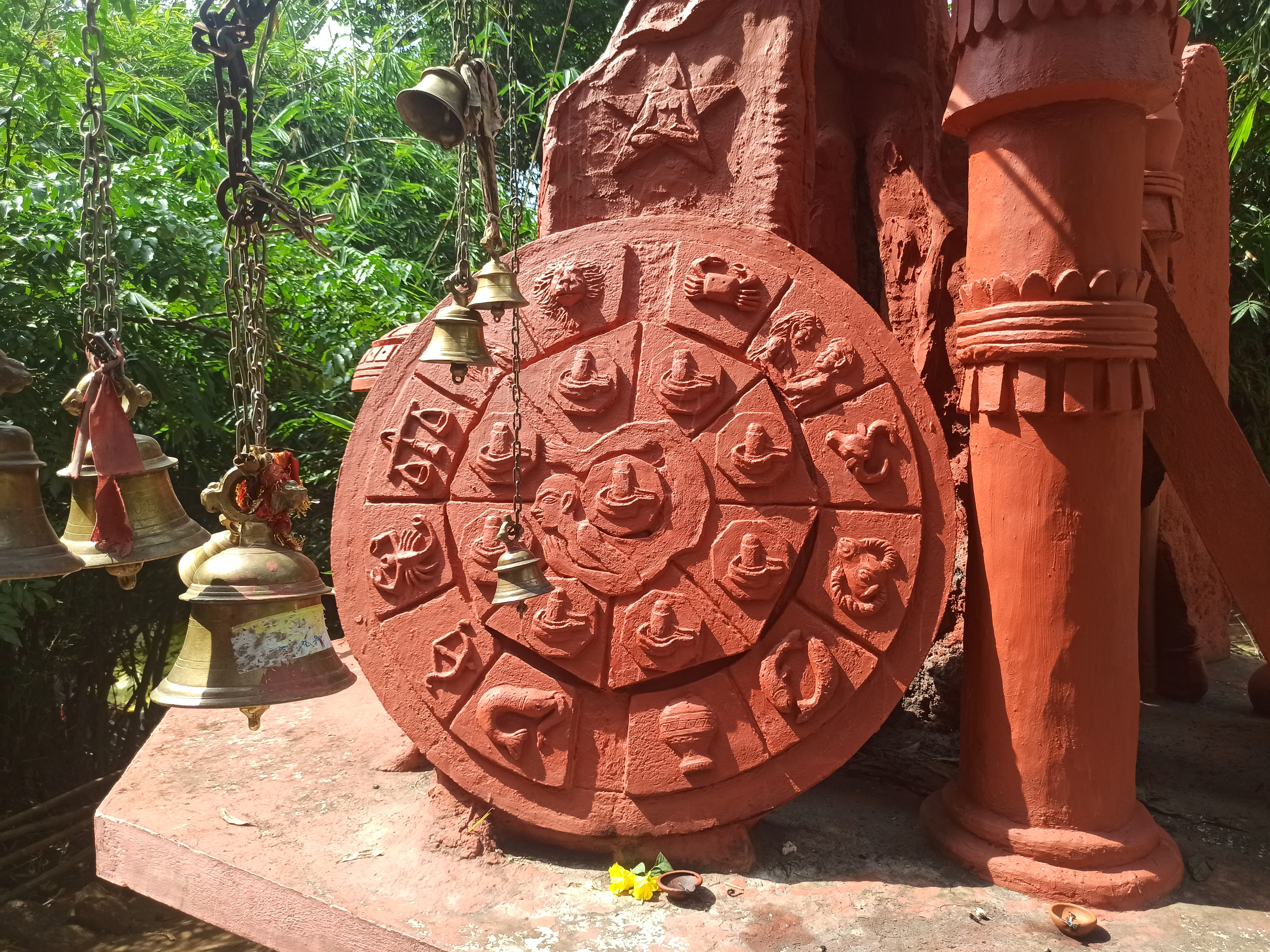
Entrance to the Dham

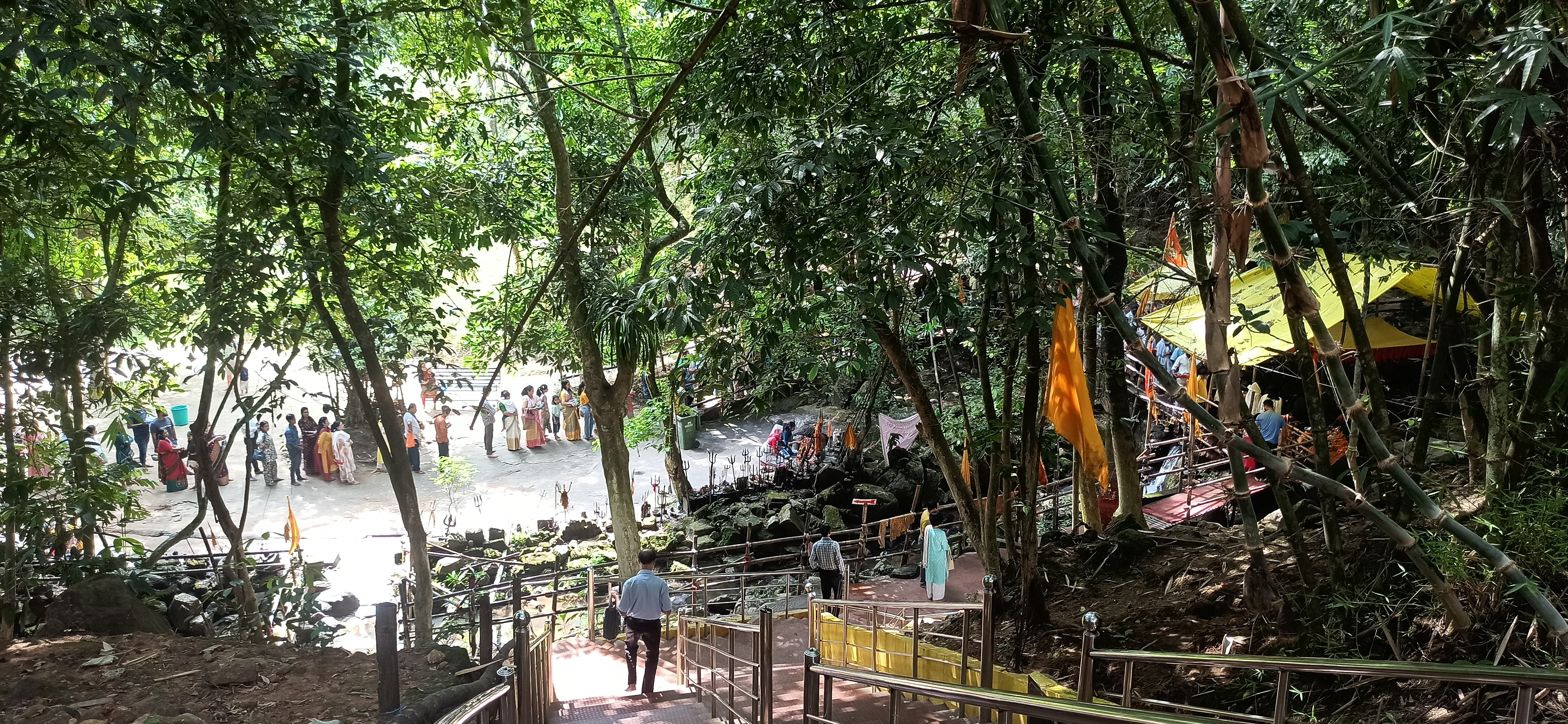
Devotees at dham

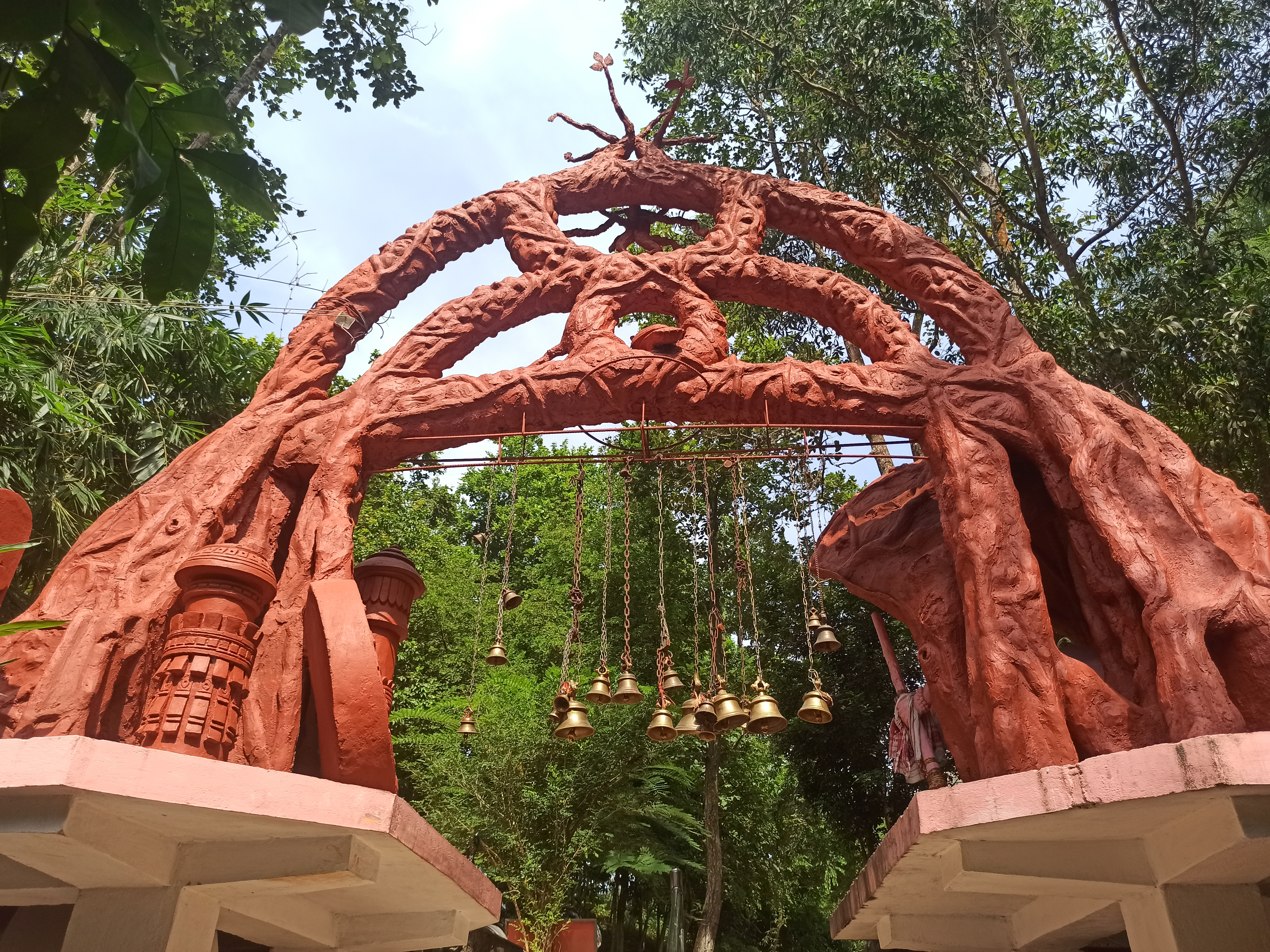
Entrance to the Dham
