= Garbhanga Wildlife Sanctuary =

Wildlife sanctuary in Assam, India

- IUCN category IV (habitat/species management area)
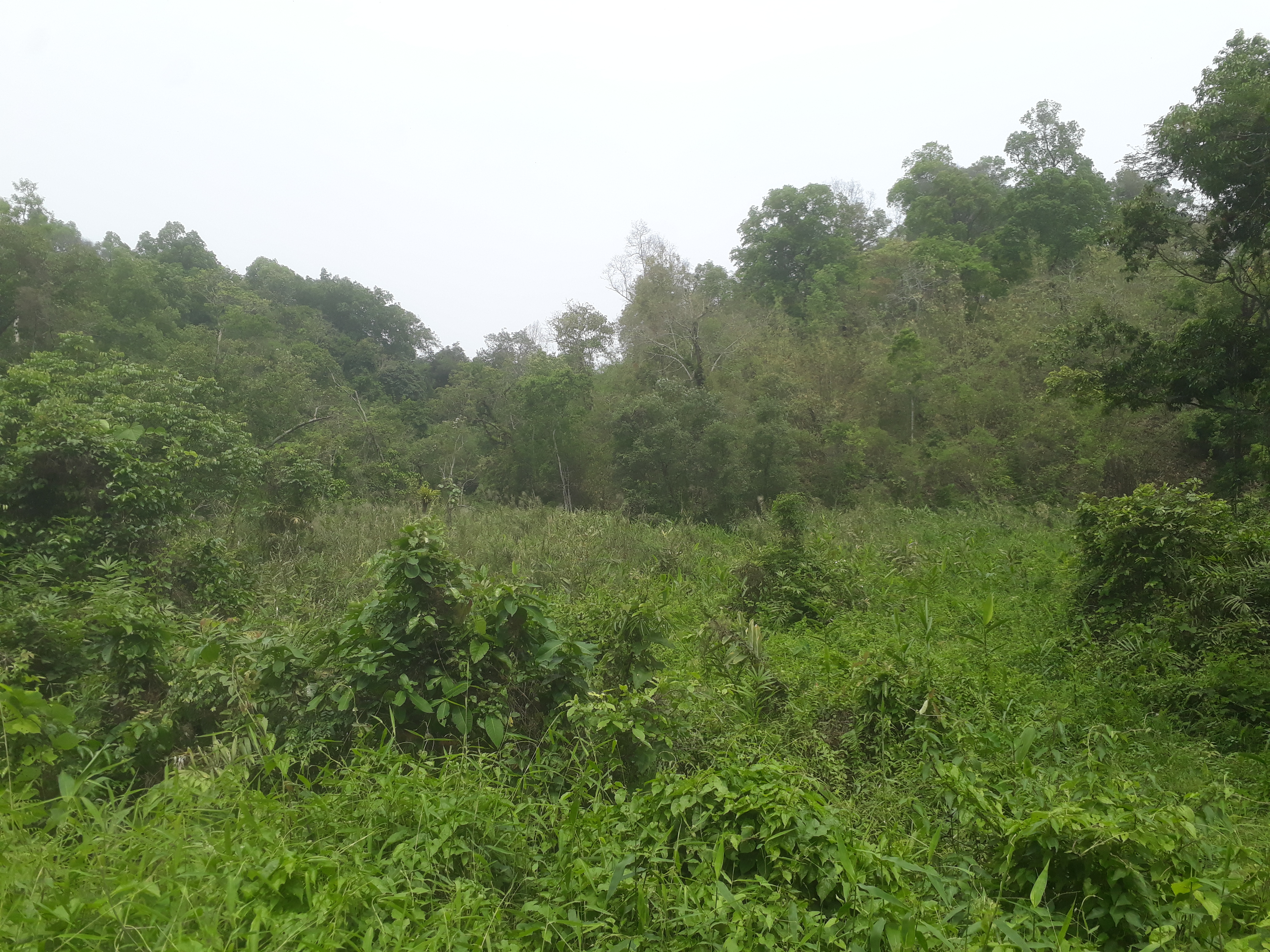
- Garbhanga Wildlife Sanctuary
- Interactive map of Garbhanga Wildlife Sanctuary
- Location: Guwahati, Assam, India
- Nearest city: Guwahati, India
- Coordinates: 26°05′36″N 91°44′57″E
- Area: 117 km^{2} (45.2 sq mi)
- Governing body: Ministry of Environment and Forests, Government of India

Garbhanga Wildlife Sanctuary (formerly Garbhanga and Rani Reserve Forest) is a wildlife sanctuary on the southwestern side of Guwahati City, bordering the state of Meghalaya, India. The forested area is the key urban wildlife site and catchment area near Guwahati City.

Located approximately 15 km (10 miles) away from Guwahati, Garbhanga Wildlife Sanctuary is situated in the southern part of Assam, bordering the foothills of Meghalaya. It is located very close to the Deepor Bill, and because of its location in an urban area it is considered a key wildlife area of Guwahati City.

Garbhanga Wildlife Sanctuary has a total land area of 117 km^{2} (45 sq mi) and lies between the Garbhanga and Rani ranges.

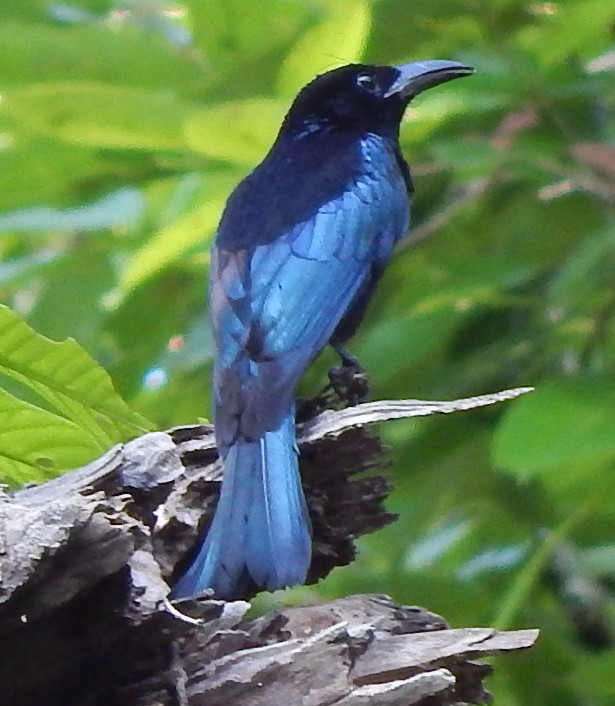
Spangled drongo at Garbhanga

== Etymology ==
The origin of wildlife sanctuary's name is unclear. However, some believe that the name comes from the Karbi people, who came from the Markang area of Sonapur and eventually entered the hilly forest for Jhum cultivation.

Garbhanga was declared a wildlife sanctuary by the second secretary to the government of Assam, Mr G.T. Lloyd. He was under the supervision of Major Briggs, who surveyed the forest in 1862.

== Brief boundary description ==
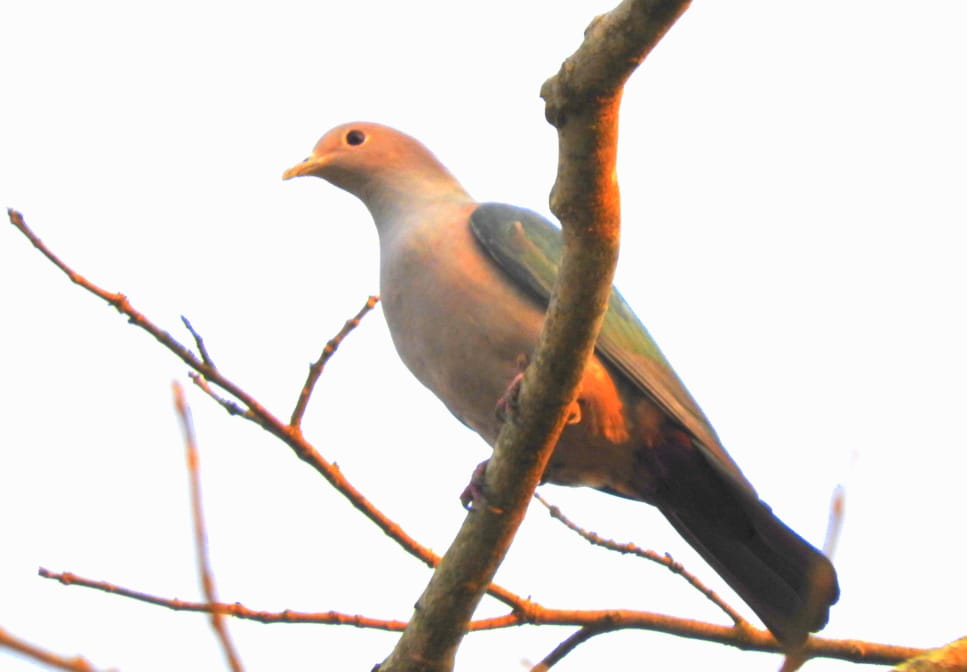
Green imperial pigeon

The Garbhanga Wildlife Sanctuary is surrounded by Guwahati City and Dipor Bill in the South, the Meghalayan ranges on the east and north, and Rani Range on the west.

=== North ===
The northern boundary starts at BSF headquarters near the VIP Road, then runs along the foothills of Matia, Chakradeo, Dipor Bil, Mahua Para, Pamohi, and Mainakhurung up to Paschdhora River, which is the common boundary between Garbhanga Reserve Forest and Rani Reserve Forest. From there, the boundary runs along Phalbama, Nawagaon, and Nalapara, up to Lokhara Village and to the Bhimeswar Dham Siva Temple, which is situated in the northeast corner.

=== East ===
On the east side, the boundary runs along the Basistha river, up to the front side of the Government Art School and then follows the stream. Permanent boundary pillars are situated near the Basistha River, then the eastern boundary runs up to Umthana Forest Camp. The name of the river changes in different locations, such as Umsing, Umpani, Umrit etc. This entire stretch is the interstate boundary with Meghalaya.

=== South ===
The southern boundary starts at Doomati village, which is the joining point of Umrit and Umsopari rivers. From there, the boundary runs up to Pathar Khama, then up to Rangang River that runs out from Meghalaya.

=== West ===
The western boundary starts at Pathar Khama, then goes up Jeepable Fair Weather Road along the Umsang River. From this point the boundary runs along Naharpaham, Bhadiakhowa, where it meets Umtru River, and then the boundary follows the stream to where it meets Kapili river. The boundary then runs along Ganapati, Rani, Bahupara, Andherijuli, Rani Tea Estate, Sajanpara, Patgaon, to where it meets at the starting point at the corner of BSF Headquarters.

== Landscape and biodiversity ==
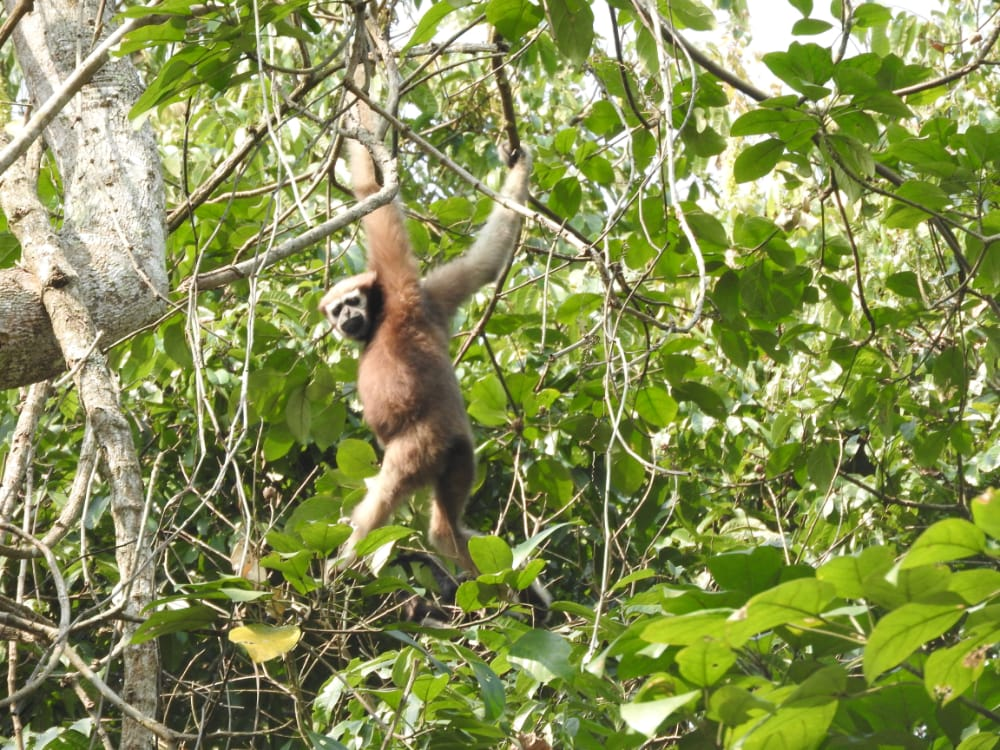
Hoolock gibbon in Garbhanga

In earlier days, various NGOs and researchers witnessed rare animals such as serow, clouded leopard, and bison and wanted to study Garbhanga. Therefore, when the Working Plan of the Kamrup East Division was prepared, an attempt was made to document the faunal and flora diversity of Garbhanga and Rani Reserve Forest.

=== Flora ===
The wildlife sanctuary has diverse flora. A study has found 139 species of trees, 122 herbs and shrubs, 52 species of climbers, 11 species of orchids, and five species of bamboo and rattan were documented.

=== Fauna ===
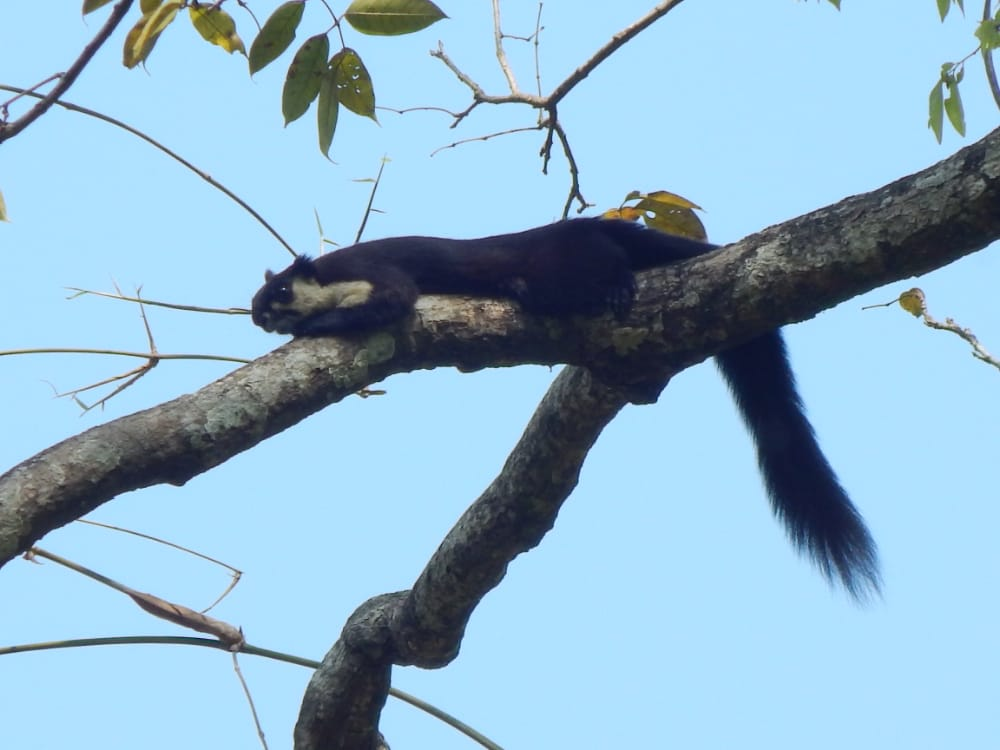
Malayan giant squirrel

The wildlife sanctuary is rich in fauna. A total of 36 species of mammals, 219 species of birds, 38 species of reptiles, 15 species of amphibians, 168 species of butterflies, and 15 species of spiders have been documented.

== Disturbance and threats ==
In May 2005, at the 15th Annual Meeting of Early Bird, a local NGO warned the Assam government about the danger of losing the wildlife sanctuary in the future.

The main threats to wildlife are encroachment, dumping of garbage, and deforestation.

The NGO requested that the government prevent the encroachment on wild animals and also called for a ban on the dumping of garbage in the wetlands.

== Present status ==
Groups have been constantly demanding the upgrading of Garbhanga-Rani Reserved Forests into a wildlife sanctuary for its better protection and care.

- Hydrological considerations – Protection of the watershed areas of Guwahati city and its adjacent areas would regulate water flow, maintain water quality and nutrient cycles, and prevent soil erosion and sedimentation.
- Genetic and species considerations – Protection of wild gene pools of flora and diverse avian, mammalian, reptilian, and other fauna.
- Ethnobotanical considerations – Protection of medicinal plants traditionally used by tribal communities residing in and around the forested areas.
- Economic considerations – Protection and maintenance of the areas with high scenic value for eco-tourism, which would provide economic opportunity to ethnic tribal inhabitants.

=== Declared a wildlife sanctuary ===
On 7 April 2022, in the Assam Gazette, the governor of Assam proposed that Garbangha Reserved Forest should be declared a wildlife sanctuary, which made it the 25th wildlife sanctuary in Assam.
