= Srimanta Sankardev Kalakshetra =

Art museum in Assam, India

Srimanta Shankardev Kalakshetra
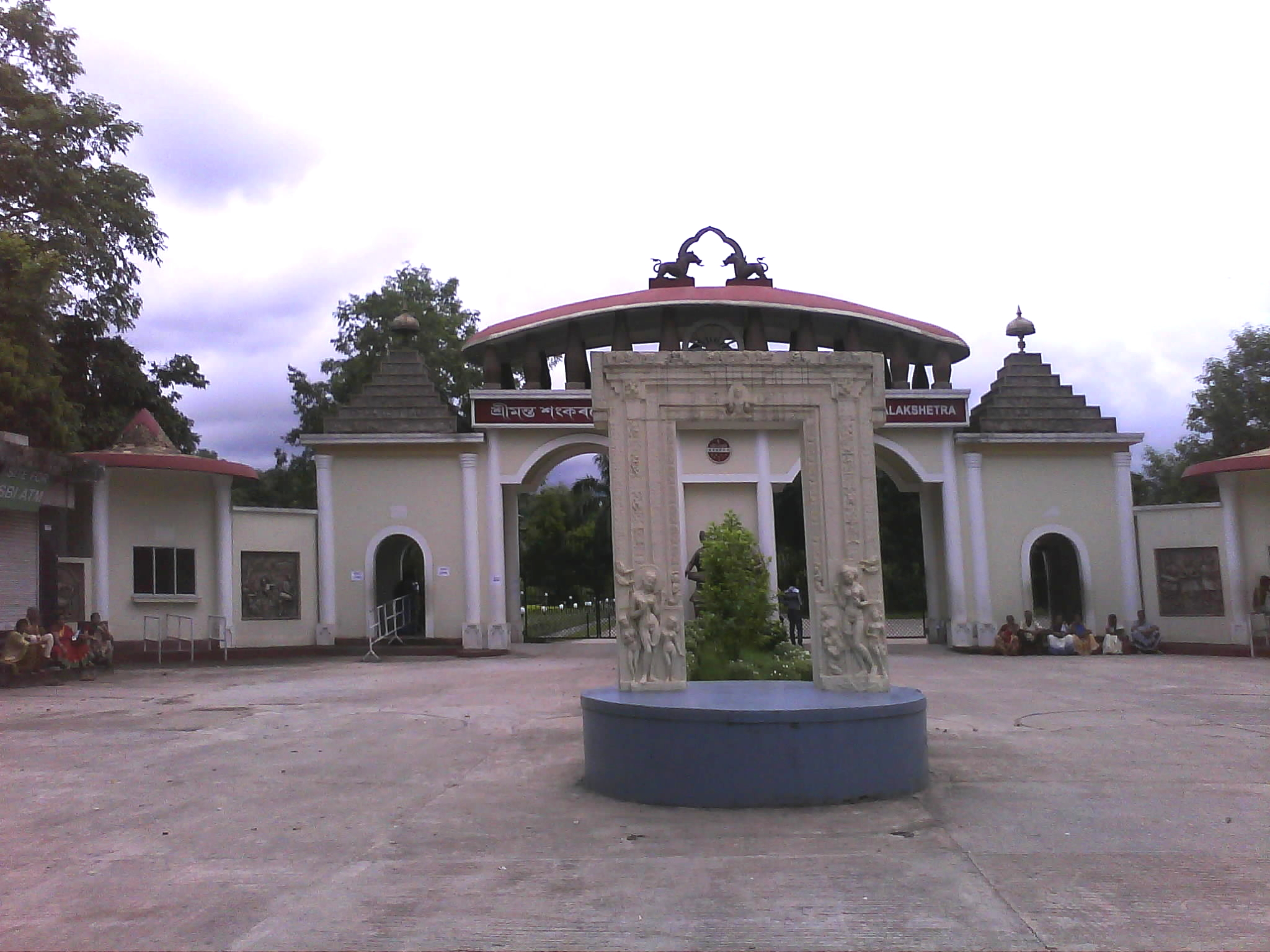
- Established: 9 November 1988
- Location: Guwahati, Assam, India
- Coordinates: 26.1306°N 91.8224°E

Srimanta Sankaradev Kalakshetra, commonly known as Kalakshetra, is a cultural institution in the Panjabari area of Guwahati, Assam, India, built in the 1990s. It is named after the medieval poet-playwright and reformer Srimanta Sankardev, and includes a cultural museum, library, a children's park, and various facilities for preserving, demonstrating and performing cultural items and history. Kalakshetra is the largest cultural congregation in Northeast India, and is also a major tourist spot in Guwahati. The galleries on the site display the art of Assam and the rest of the north-eastern region, and the premises also include eateries, places of worship, emporiums and open-air theatres.

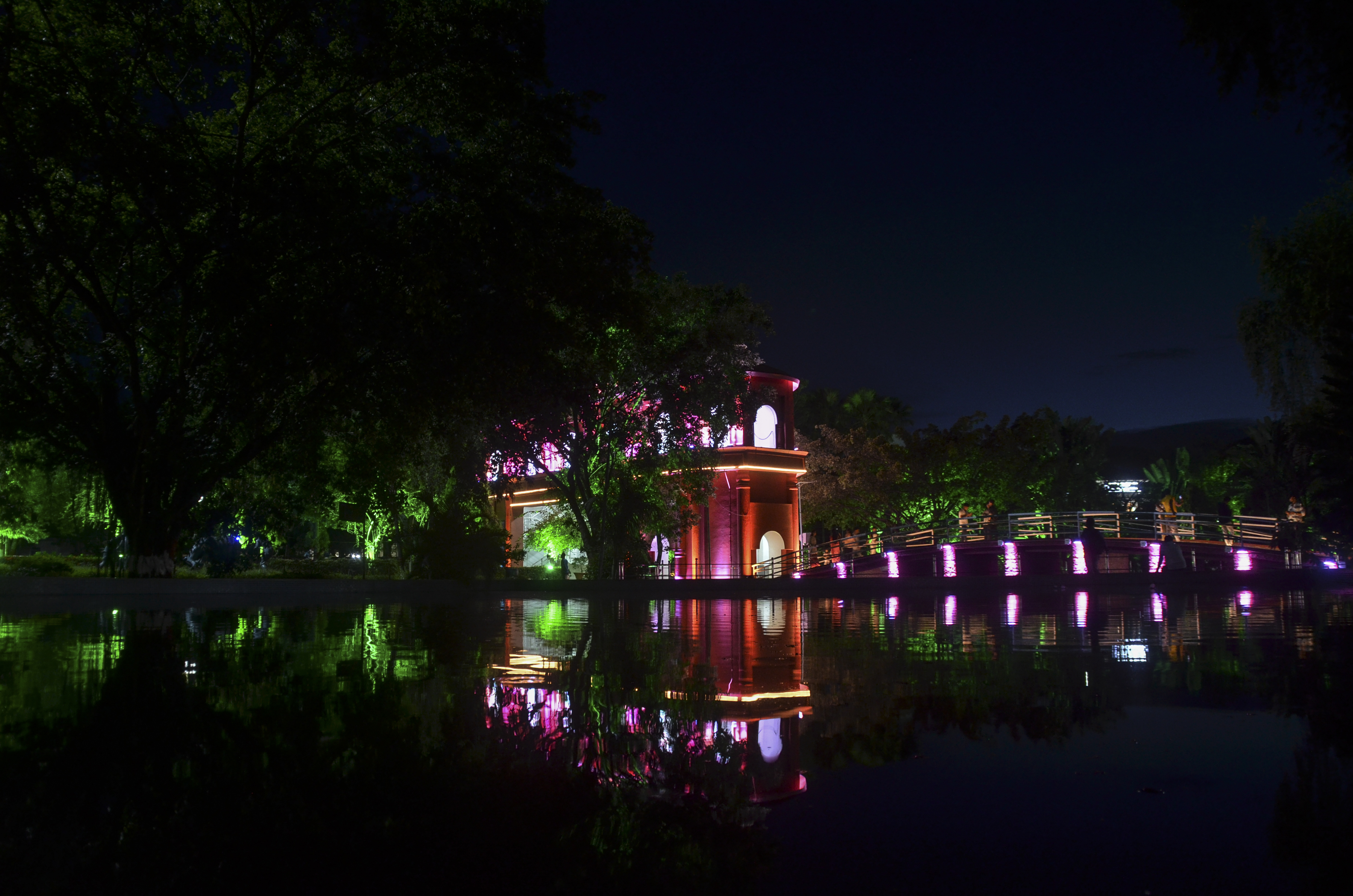
Night view at Srimanta Sankardev Kalakhetra in Guwahati, Assam.

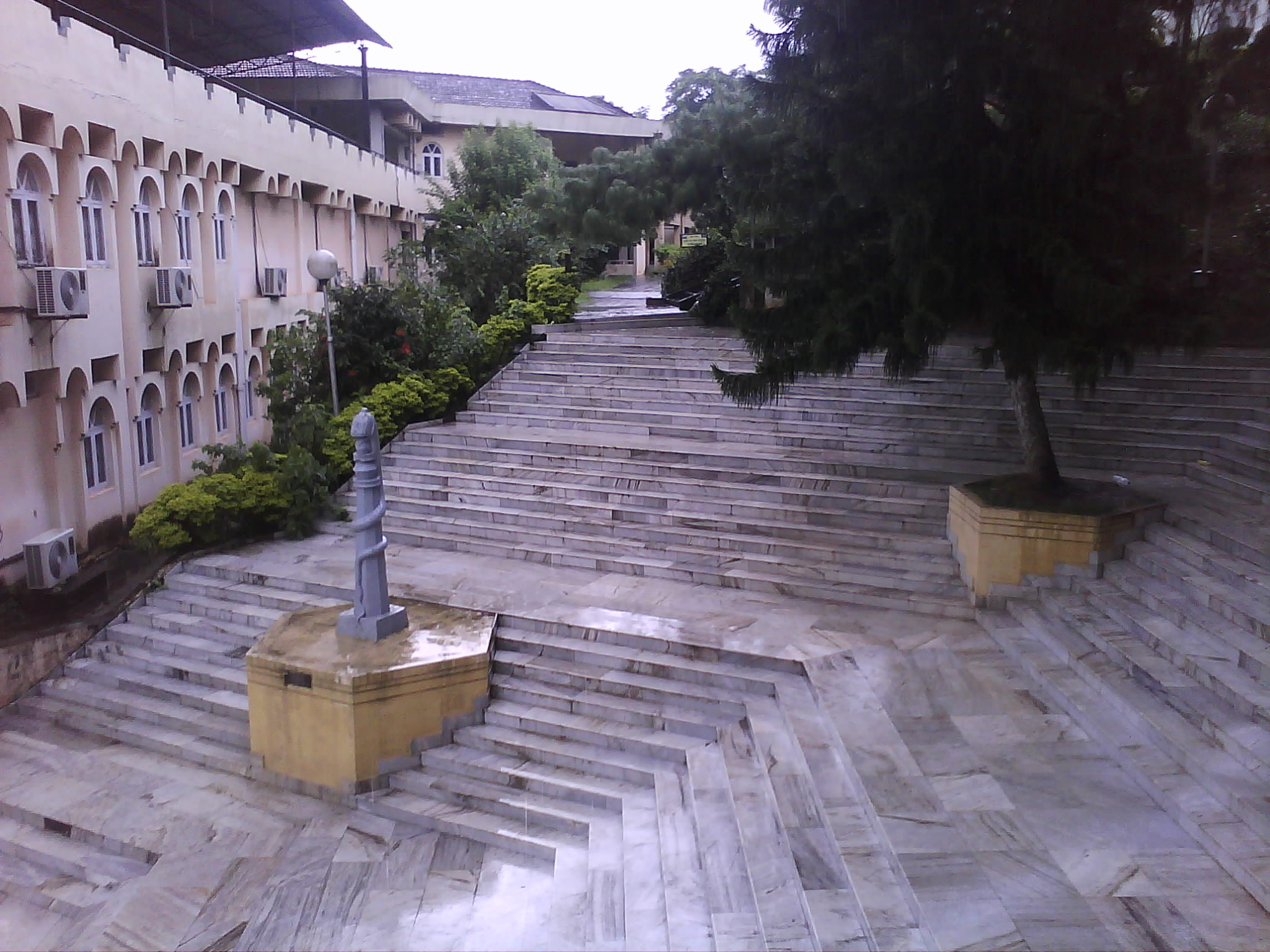
A view of Srimanata Sankardev Kalakhetra

It is governed by a body of executives selected by the Assam Government's Cultural Department, and is headed by a director of the Assam Civil Service or Indian Administrative Service cadre. The Kalakshetra is divided into several complexes.

== Description ==
The Central Museum exhibits items used by different ethnic groups of Assam. The museum also houses several cultural objects from the state. The open-air theatre can accommodate 2000 people and hosts cultural programs, traditional dance and drama performances. The Kalakshetra also has an Artists' Village, which replicates the village society of Assam. The Sahitya Bhavan, the library in the Kalakshetra, is a repository of the literature of the Assam region, housing a large collection of rare books and manuscripts. Another section of the art complex is the Lalit-Kala Bhavan, the centre used for exhibitions and workshops on art and culture. A heritage park is also a part of the complex of the Shankardev Kalakshetra, containing a cable car facility for tourists. The Bhupen Hazarika museum is another attraction of Kalakshetra.

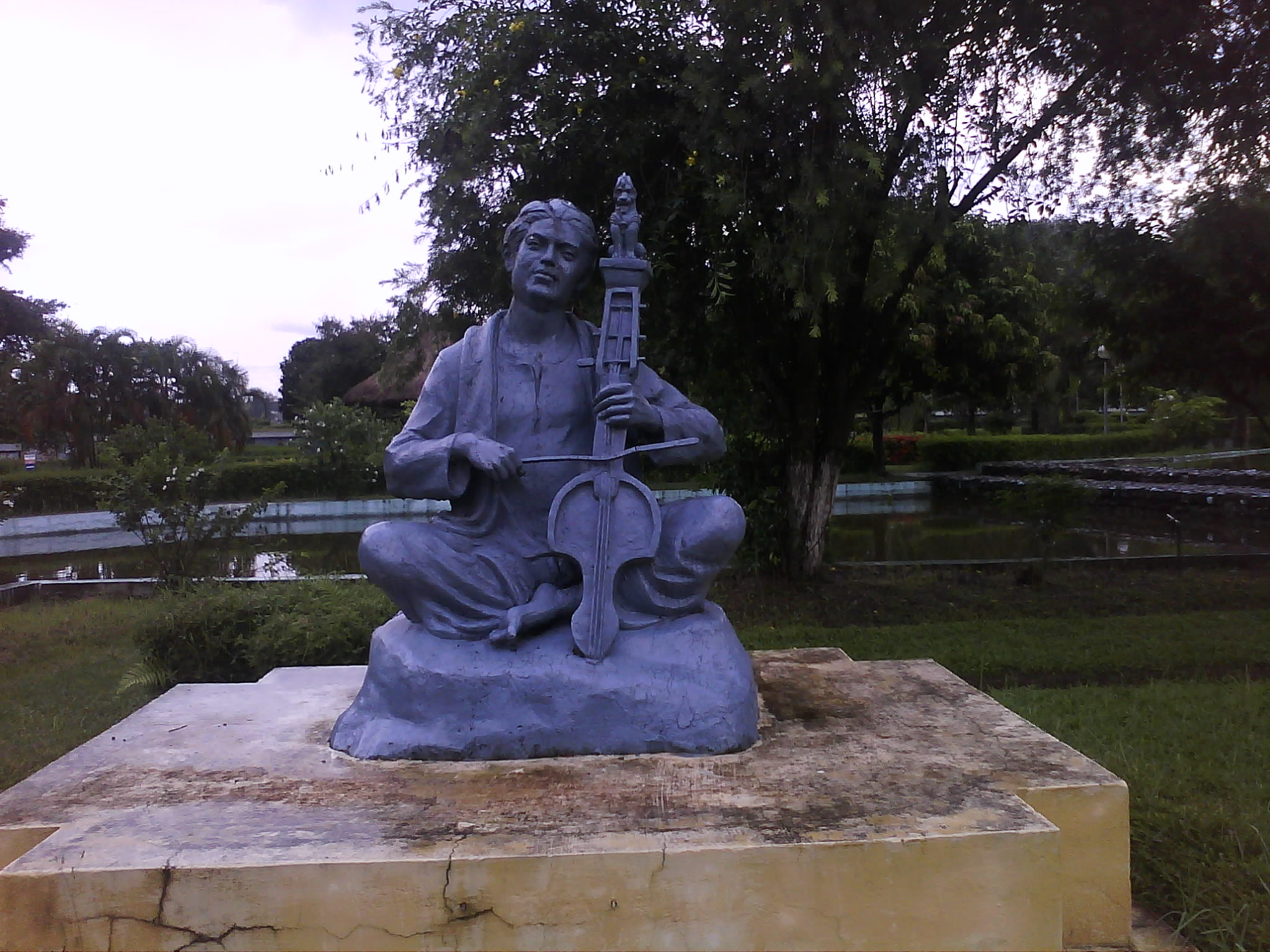
A sculpture at Srimanata Sankardev Kalakhetra

== Gallery ==
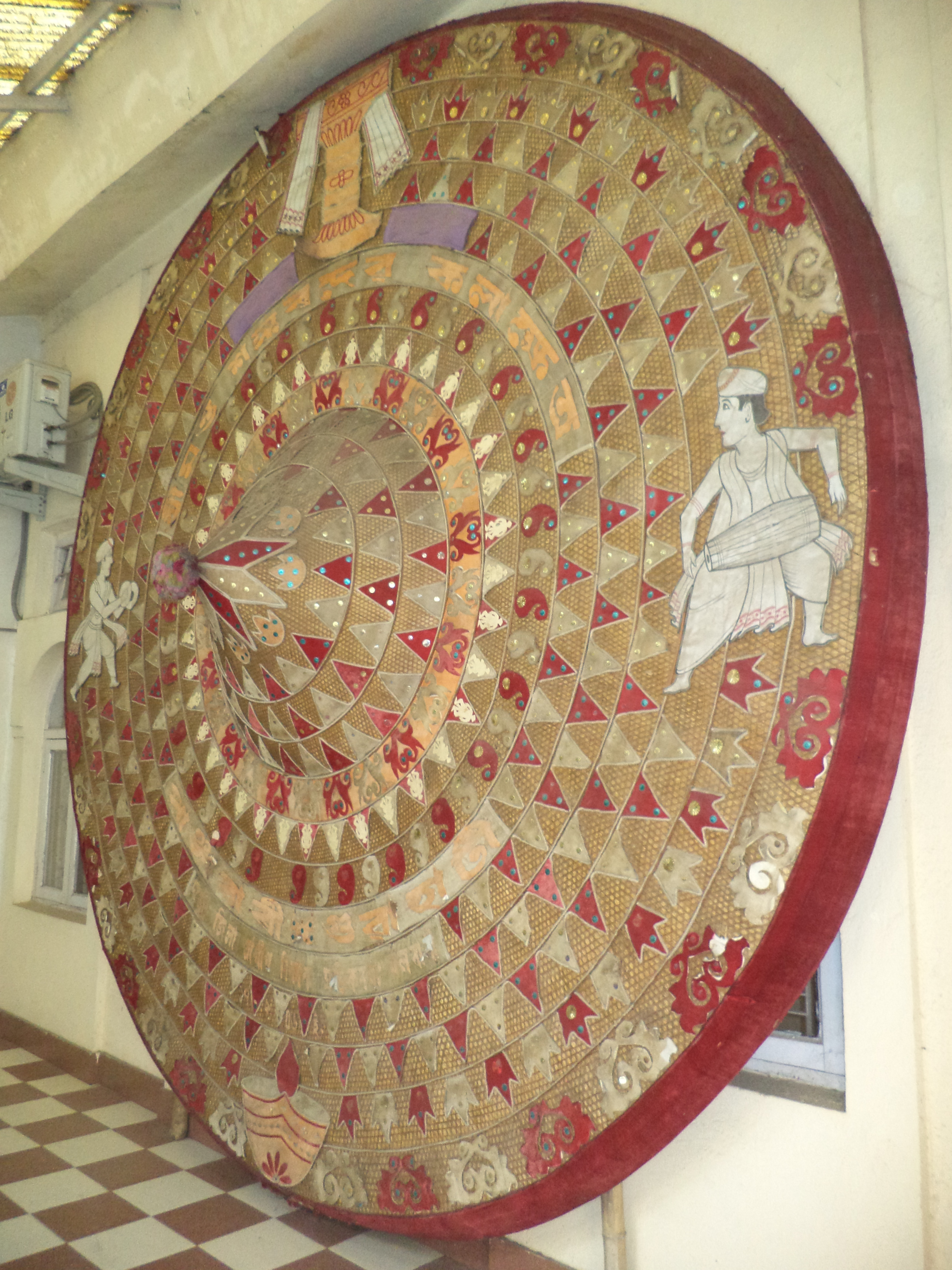
A Jaapi at Kalakhetra

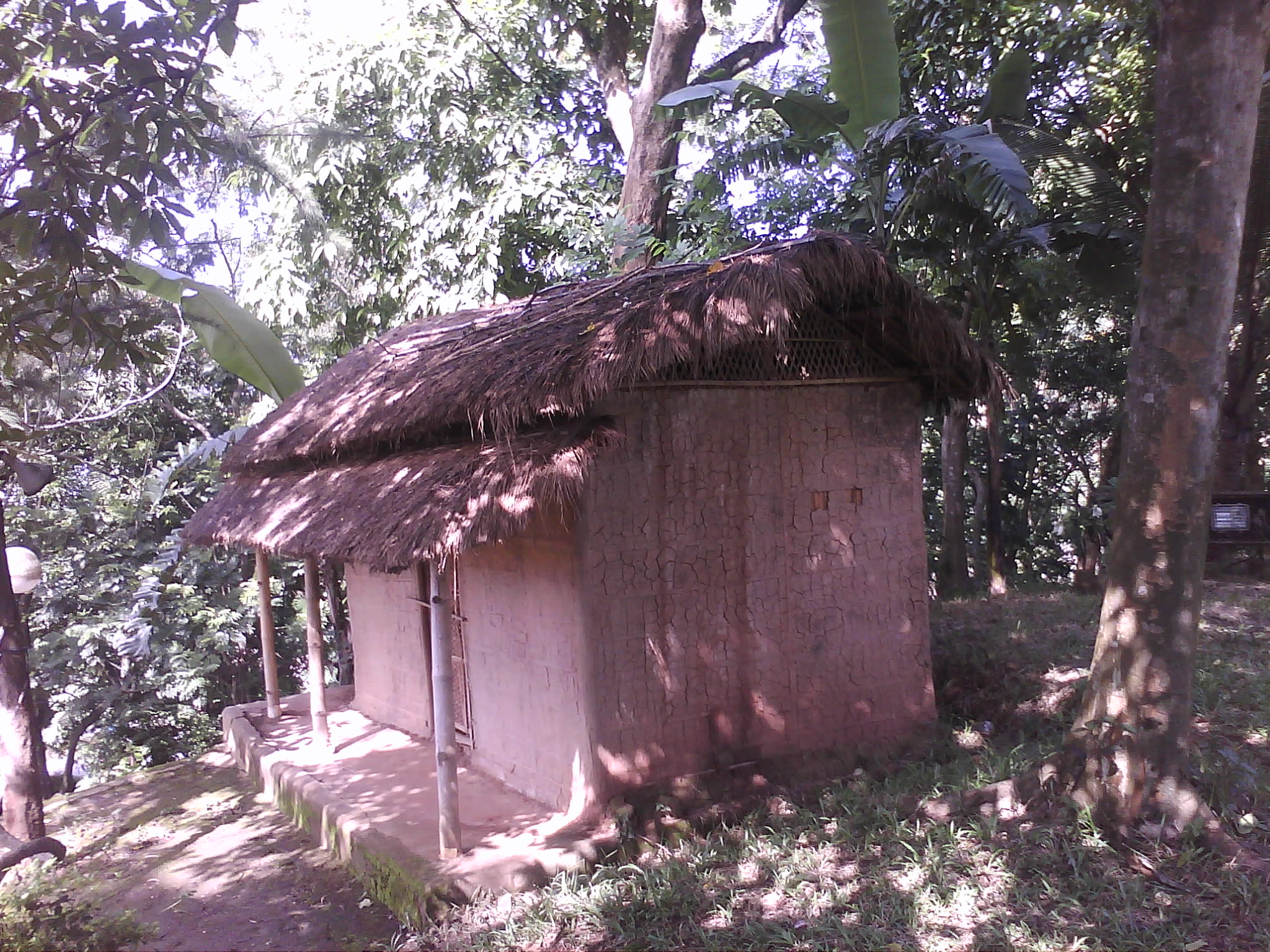
A hut inside Srimanta Sankardev Kalakhetra

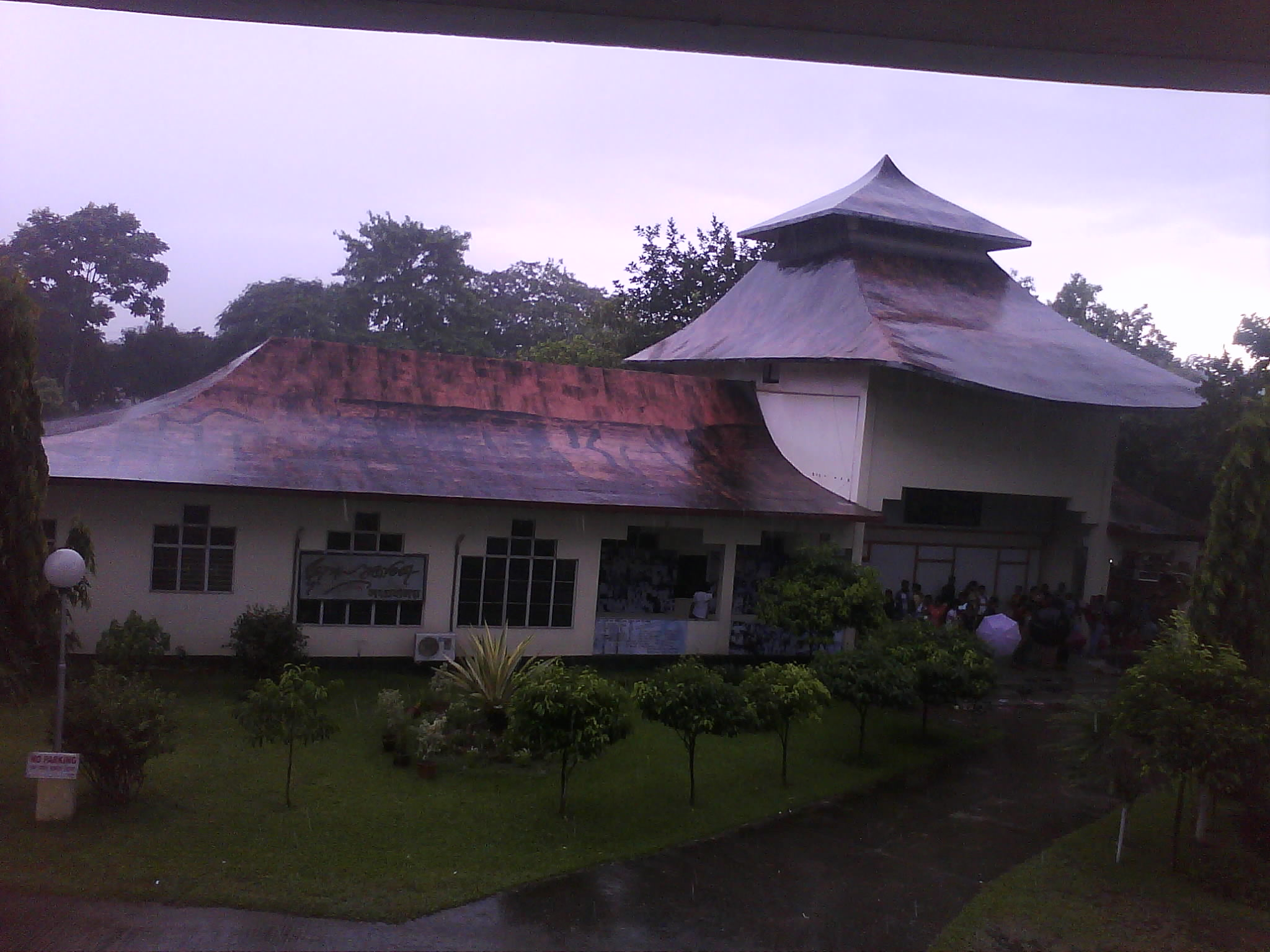
Bhupen Hazarika Museum at Kalakhetra

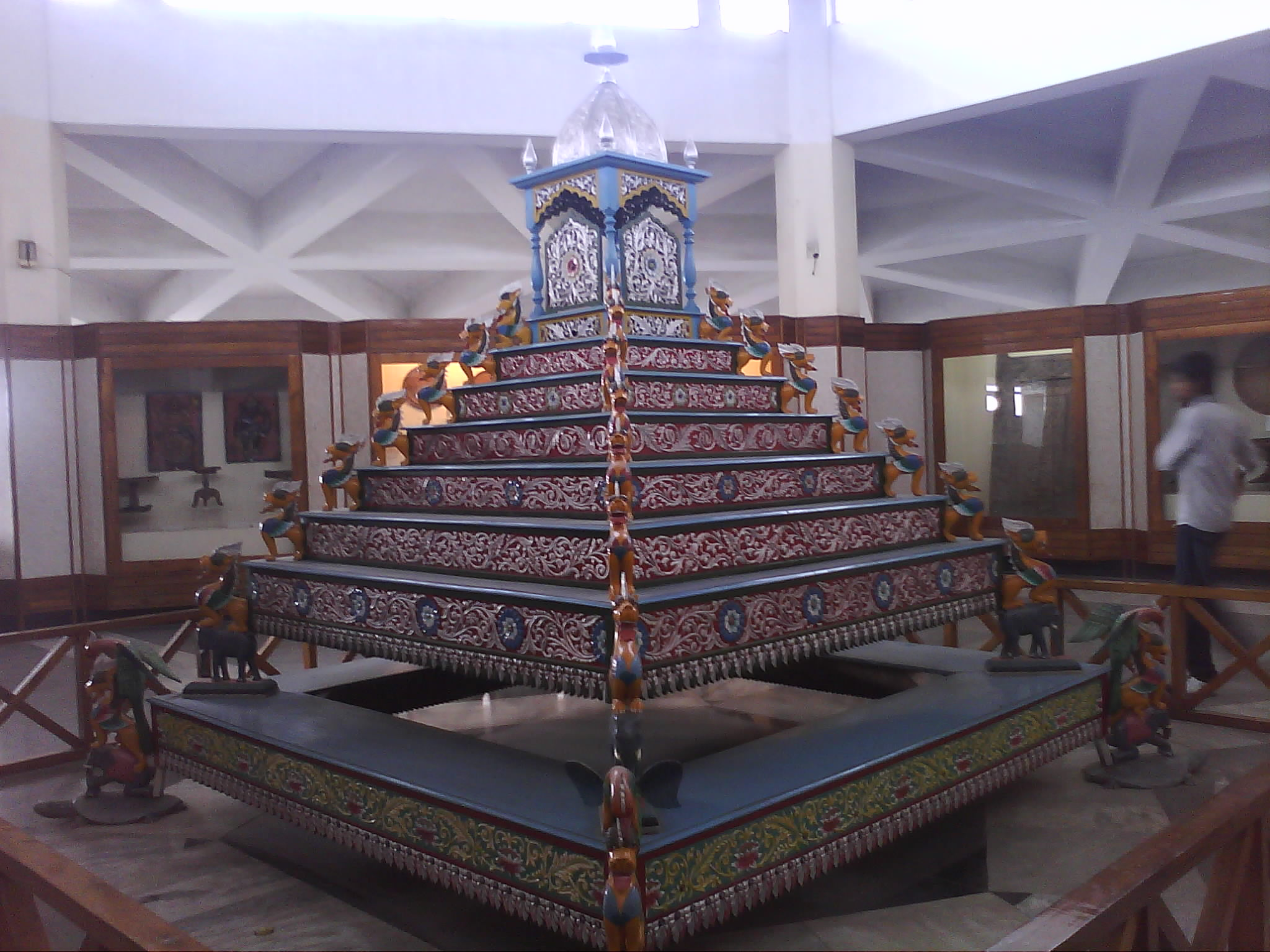
Manikut inside Kalakhetra

== See also ==
- Tourism in North East India
