= Jhanji =

Jhanji Jhanzi Jaji
- Village, Semi-town
- Location in Assam, India Jhanji (India)
- Coordinates: 26.8479°N 94.4916°E
- Country: India
- State: Assam
- District: Sivasagar, Jorhat

Government
  - Body: Mourabazar Gaon Panchayat, Jakaisuk Gaon Panchayat, Jhanji Hanhchara, Tamulisiga, Jarabari

Languages
  - Official: Assamese
- Time zone: UTC+5:30 (IST)
- PIN: 785683
- Vehicle registration: AS04, AS03

Jhanji (Assamese: [zã.zi]) is a small semi-rural area situated in Sivasagar and Jorhat districts. The river Jhanji River divides these two districts.

== History ==
The river Jhanji is famous from the time of Ahom kingdom in Assam. It physically divides Jorhat and Sivasagar districts of Assam.The word Jhanji is an Assamese compound word. In Assamese, Jhanji means "jhanjori kohiyua nodi"; the river which flows waste products of flood. In the time of flood it carries away trees, mud, etc. So it was named as Jhanji.

In old Bihu songs such as Jibon Jaji noi and Jhanji noi eribo nuwaru, the Jhanji river is mentioned.

== Geography ==
Jhanji is located at 26.894N94.420E

== Politics ==
Jhanji is part of the 103rd Amguri Legislative Assembly. Jhanji is part of the Jorhat (Lok Sabha constituency).

== Educational institutions ==
=== Colleges ===
- Jhanji Hemnath Sarma College, Jhanji Jamuguri
- Ghana Kanta Borah College, Tamulichiga

=== Schools ===
- Jhanji Higher Secondary School, Sivasagar
- Ghanakanta Bora Senior Secondary School, Tamulichiga, Jorhat
- Jhanji Hanhchara Higher Secondary School, Jhanji, Jorhat
- Jarabari High School, Jhanji, Sivasagar
- Chandradhar Gogoi Shankardev Shishu Vidya Niketan, Jhanji, Sivasagar

== Notable Personalities ==
- Tirthanath Sarma, renowned litterateur of Assam, former president of Assam Sahitya Sabha, Makum venue.
- Satyendranath Sarma, famous Assamese litterateur, former president of Assam Sahitya Sabha, Titabor venue.
- Chandra Prasad Saikia, renowned Assamese writer
- Kapil Thakur, Assamese lyricist, he wrote some famous Assamese songs like 'Maya Mathu Maya' etc. Father of Zubeen Garg.
- Zubeen Garg, his ancestral home is at Jhanji Tamulisiga.
- Binanda Chandra Barua, known as Dhwanikabi, his workplace was Jhanji HS school. He wrote the famous poem 'Rangoli Burhir Daan' in memory of an Ahom soldier 'Rangamua' of Jhanji Jamuguri.
- Jagannath Mahanta, notable Satriya dancer, research scholar.
- Chitralata Phukan, renowned Assamese writer.
