= Satyendranath Sarma =

Satyendranth Sarma
- Born: 1917; Jhanji, Sibasagar, Assam
- Died: 11 August 1999 (aged 81–82)
- Occupations: Writer, Critic, Historian
- Writing career
- Language: Assamese

Satyendranath Sarma (1917 - 1999) was an Assamese writer, educationalist, research scholar, critic and historian. He presided over the Assam Sahitya Sabha venue of Titabor in 1975.

== Biography ==
=== Birth ===
Satyendranath Sarma was born in Jhanji, Sivasagar in 1917 to Golapchandra Sarma and Senehi Devi.

=== Education ===
In 1934, he passed matriculation from Jhanji Higher Secondary School (than Jhanji High School). In 1936, he passed I.A. examination and in 1939, he passed B.A. examination from Cotton College. In 1941 he completed M.A. in Assamese from Calcutta University. In 1955, he achieved doctorate degree.
