= Gonga Chilonir Pakhi =

Gonga Chilonir Pakhi (Feathers of the tern)
- A Screenshot of the film
- Directed by: Padum Baruah
- Written by: Lakshmi Nandan Bora
- Produced by: Padum Baruah
- Music by: Padum Baruah
- Release date: 1976
- Countries: Assam, India
- Language: Assamese

Gonga Chilonir Pakhi (English: Feathers of the tern) is an Assamese language film by Padum Barua released in 1976. The film is based on the novel of the same title authored by Lakshmi Nandan Bora.

== Plot summary ==
The film tells the story of Basanti, a young village woman caught between two men in a small town in the 1960s. Following her husband Mathura's death, she begins to dream of a new life with her former lover, Dhananjay. However, he fails to reciprocate, forcing Basanti into a lonely life as a widow.

== Characters ==
- Basanti, a young village woman
- Mathura, Basanti's husband
- Dhananjay, Basanti's former lover
- Bhogram, Basanti's elder brother
- Taru, Basanti's elder sister-in-law
- Monbori, the house cleaner

== See also ==
- Jollywood
