= Dipor Bil =

Permanent fresh water lake in Assam

Dipor Bil or Deepor Beel
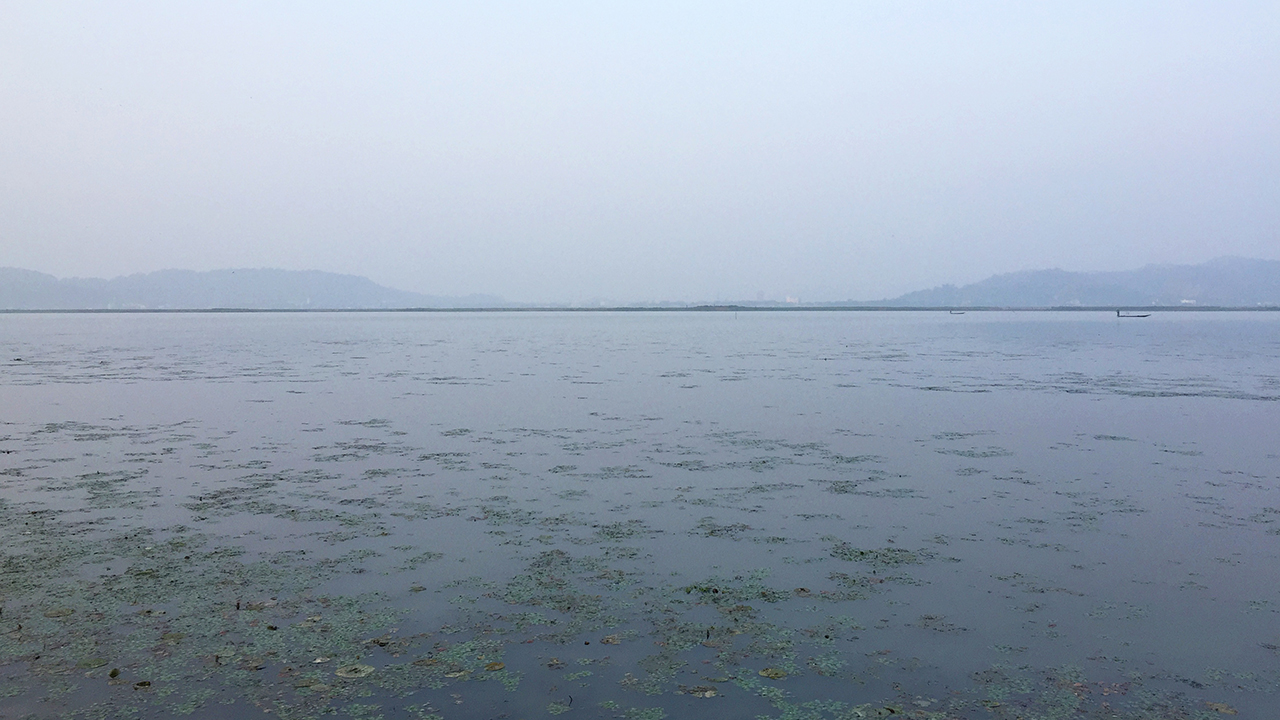

- Location within India
- Interactive map of Dipor Bil or Deepor Beel
- Location: Guwahati, Kamrup district, Assam
- Coordinates: 26.13°N 91.66°E
- Type: Fresh water
- Basin countries: India
- Surface area: 4,014 ha (15.50 sq mi)
- Average depth: 1 m (3.3 ft)
- Max. depth: 4 m (13 ft)
- Surface elevation: 53 m (174 ft)
- Settlements: Twelve villages on the periphery of the beel
- Website: www.diporbil.org

Ramsar Wetland
- Official name: Deepor Beel
- Designated: 19 August 2002
- Reference no.: 1207

Dipor Bil, also spelled Deepor Beel (Pron: dɪpɔ:(r) bɪl) (bil or beel means "lake" in the local Assamese language), is located to the south-west of Guwahati city, in Kamrup Metropolitan district of Assam, India. It is a permanent freshwater lake, in a former channel of the Brahmaputra River, to the south of the main river. In 1989, 4.1 km² of the area was declared a wildlife sanctuary by the Government of Assam. It is listed as a wetland under the Ramsar Convention which designated the lake as a Ramsar Site in November 2002 for undertaking conservation measures on the basis of its biological and environmental importance.

Considered one of the largest beels in the Brahmaputra valley of Lower Assam, it is categorised as representative of the wetland type under the Burma monsoon forest biogeographic region.

== Access ==
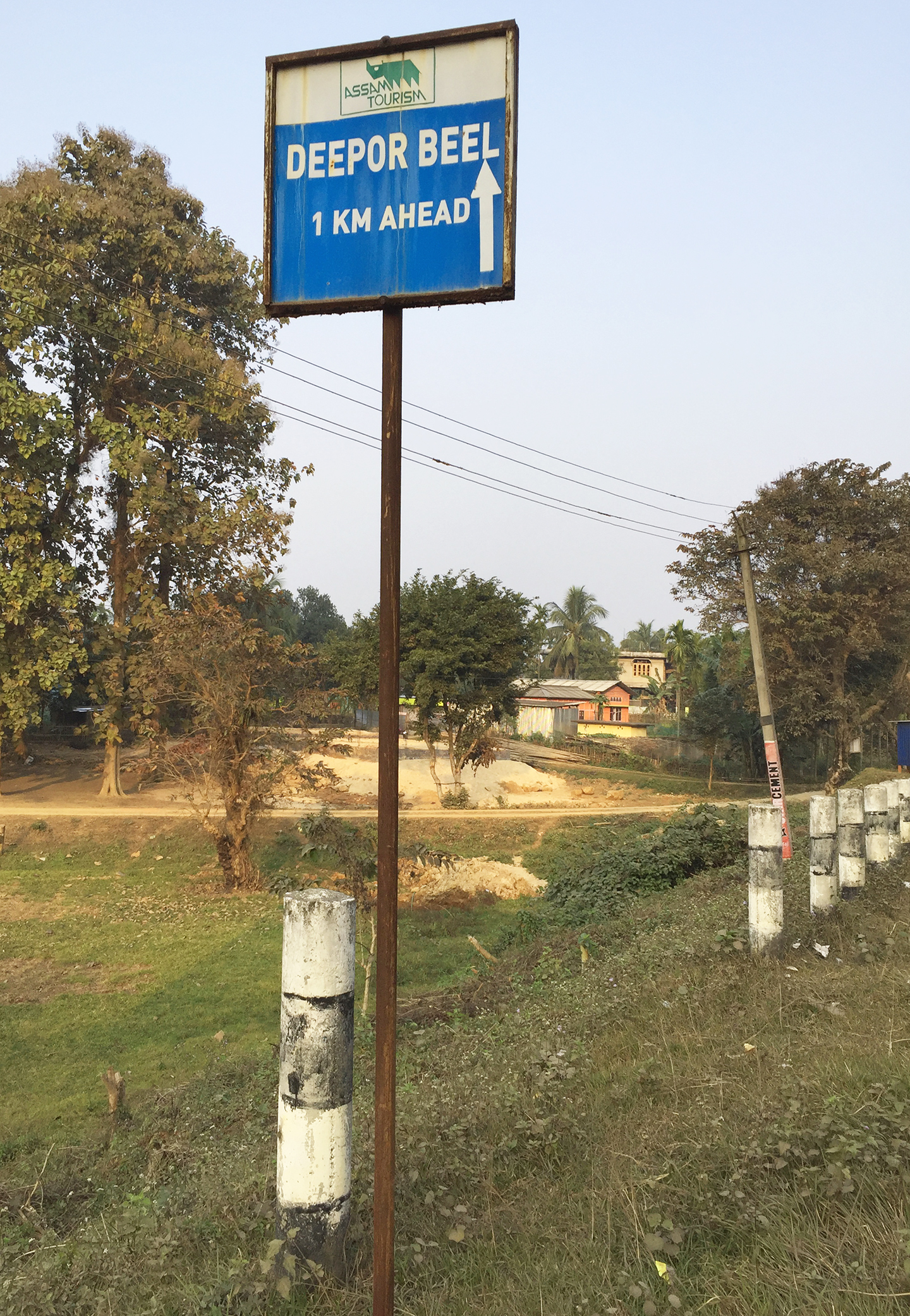
On the way to Deepor Beel in Guwahati, Assam

It is located 13 km South West of Guwahati on the National Highway (NH. 31), on the Jalukbari-Khanapara bypass, alongside its north western boundary. PWD road skirts the northern fringe of the Rani and Garbhanga Reserve Forests on the south. The National Highway 37 borders the beel on the east and north-east and the Assam Engineering College Road on the north. Also, minor roads and tracts exist in the vicinity of the beel. The beel is about 5 km from the Guwahati Airport (LGB Int. Airport). A broad gauge railway line skirts the lake.

== Topography and geology ==
The beel is bounded by the steep highlands on the north and south, and the valley formed has a broad U-shape with the Rani and Garbhanga hills forming the backdrop. The geologic and tectonic history of the region provide the links to the hydrology and channel dynamics of rivers and pattern, and intensity of land use in the area. It is commonly stated that the beel together with those adjoining it are an abandoned channel of the Brahmaputra system.

While the beel and its lowland fringe are said to be underlaid by recent alluvium consisting of clay, silt, sand and pebbles, the highlands immediately to the north and south of the beel are made up of gneisses and schists of the Archaean age.

== Hydrology ==
The Basistha and Kalmani rivers and local monsoon run-off are the main sources of water to the lake, between May and September. Khonajan channel drains the beel into the Brahmaputra river, 5 km to the north. It acts as a natural stormwater reservoir during the monsoon season for the Guwahati city (stated to be the only major storage water basin for the city's drainage, with about four metres depth of water during monsoon dropping to about one metre during the dry season.

The beel has a perennial water spread area of about 10.1 km^{2}, which extends up to 40.1 km^{2} during floods. However, an area of 414 ha has been declared as "Deepor Beel Sanctuary" by the Government of Assam. As per a Remote Sensing Study the wetland area is reported to have reduced to 14.1% (405 ha) from 1990 to 2002.

Temperatures in the beel vary from 10.6^{0} to 32^{0}C. During the winter months, when the size of the lake reduces in area by about fifty percent, the shore area (up to one kilometre) is cultivated with rice paddy when the climate is also relatively cool and dry. The tropical monsoon climate prolongs from May to September when it is humid. Pre-monsoon showers are experienced between March and May.

== Flora ==
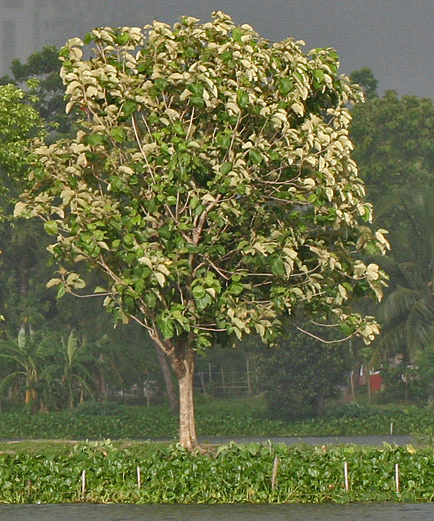
Deciduous forest within the beel basin — Tectona grandis-the common teak

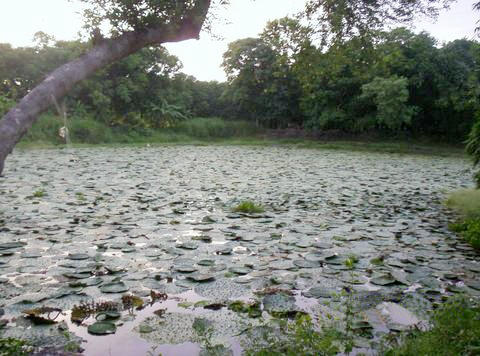
Euryale ferox — giant water lily in the beel

The hydrophytic vegetation of the beel has been classified, based on ecological adaptation, into the following categories with their floristic elements. These are:

- Aquatic vegetation like Giant Water Lily, water hyacinth, aquatic grasses, water lilies and other submerged, emergent and floating vegetation are found during the summer season.
- In the dry areas, during winter, aquatic and semi-aquatic vegetation are seen
- In deep open water area, marshy lands, mud flat, emergent vegetation, water hyacinth patches, net-grass land patches are reported
- Migratory water-fowl, residential water-fowl and terrestrial avifauna are common in paddy field areas, dry grassland areas and scattered forest areas.

A total of 18 genera of phytoplankton are reported from the core area of the beel ecosystem out of which species of Oscilatoria and Microcystis are dominant. List of aquatic plants identified in the beel are:

- Eichhornia crassipes, Pistia stratiotes, Ottelia alismoides, Lemna minor, Potamogeton crispus, Vallisneria spiralis, Hydrilla verticillata, Ipomoea aquatica (syn. I. reptans), Azolla pinnata, Spirodela polyrhiza, Eleocharis plantaginea, Nymphaea alba, Nymphaea rubra and Sagittaria sagittifolia.
- Euryale ferox, a giant water lily with edible seeds, are leased to earn revenue for the government. Other lake shore vegetation include:
- Eupatorium adoratum, Achyranthes aspera, Cyperus esculentus, Phragmites karka, Vitex trifolia, Accium basilium, Saccharum spontaneum and Imperata arundinacea.

Dominant tree species in the nearby Deciduous forests in the beel basin are species of Tectona grandis or common teak, Ficus benghalensis, Shorea robusta and Bombax malabaricum. In the surrounding forest area, aquarium plants, medicinal plant and orchids of commercial value are reported.

== Avifauna ==
The beel is a natural habitat to many varieties of birds. 219 species of birds including more than 70 migratory species are reported in the beel area. The largest congregations of aquatic birds can be seen, particularly in winter, with a reported recorded count of 19,000 water birds in a day. Some of the globally threatened species of birds like spot-billed pelican (Pelecanus philippensis), lesser adjutant stork (Leptoptilos javanicus), Baer's pochard (Aythya baeri), Pallas's sea eagle (Haliaeetus leucoryphus), greater adjutant stork (Leptoptilos dubius).

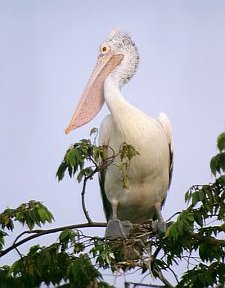
Spot-billed pelican found in beels and lakes in India

Among the large number of migratory water fowl, the Siberian crane (Grus leucogeranus) regularly migrates to this habitat during its annual journey. This is in addition to the large congregation of residential water birds seen in the lake.

In 2023, it was reported that the population of birds like the Pheasant Tailed Jacana has been declining.

Considering the richness of the bird varieties found in the beel, the BirdLife International has declared Deepor Beel as an Important Bird Area (IBA) with high priority for conservation.

== Aquatic fauna ==
Surveys have revealed 20 amphibians, 12 lizards, 18 snakes and 6 turtle and tortoise species in the beel. Over 50 commercially viable species of fish, belonging to 19 families have been identified, which supplies stock to other nearby wetlands and rivers. The beel provides food, acts as a spawning and nursery water body; some of the species breed within the beel.

== Land fauna ==
Wild Asian elephants (Elephas maximus), leopard, jungle cat and the protected barking deer, Chinese porcupine and sambar are found in the beel. Herds of elephants are reported in the beel.

== Utility of the beel ==
The inhabitants around the villages located in the periphery and the catchment of the beel use the beel for:

- Fishing
- As a waterway for transporting the villagers of the southern boundary to the N.H. 37
- Collect fodder for domestic cattle and collect aquatic seeds such as giant water lily, Nymphea sp. etc.
- Raise boro paddy – sown in December–January and harvested in April–May

The Dipor Bil is reported to provide, directly or indirectly, its natural resources for the livelihood of fourteen indigenous villages (1,200 families) located in its precincts. Freshwater fish is a vital source of protein and income for these communities; the health of these people is stated to be directly dependent on the health of this wetland ecosystem. A member of Deepor Beel Fishermen's Cooperative Society has succinctly stated: "Our forefathers protected this wetland and we are committed to do the same as we depend on the wetland for our livelihood. We will protect this wetland at any cost and against any odds".

== Deterioration of the beel ==
Natural and anthropogenic causes for the deterioration of the beel are many. For the last few years, Deepor Beel has been dealing with too many water hyacinths growing, causing trouble for the people living there, according to residents' reports. The major reasons reported in the beel ecosystem are.:

- Proliferation of human settlements, roads, and industries around the periphery (in the eastern and north-eastern sides) causing pollution problems
- Waste water from different parts of the city and the adjoining areas
- Construction of broad-gauge railway line on the periphery of the beel
- Allotment of the government vacant land to private party by Government settlement department
- Brick kilns and soil cutting
- Hunting, trapping and killing of wild birds and mammals
- Unplanned intensive fishing practices (both during day and night)
- Boragaon garbage dumping site adjoining the Dipor Bil

== Restoration activities ==
A comprehensive management plan has been set in motion and it is proposed to notify the whole beel area as a protected area.

Weeds have been removed in an area of 500 ha and the fish catch is reported to be improving. The long term measures envisaged to preserve the beel environment are:

- Encroachments and settlements around the beel periphery to be eliminated
- Train stops on the boundary of the beel to be discontinued
- To raise suitable plantations on either side of the railway line to reduce noise level
- Eco-restoration of surrounding forest area
- To preserve effectiveness of the beel as storm water detention basin for Guwahati city and creation of additional storage capacity in the naturally depressed areas within the greater metropolitan area
- Guwahati city runoff, which includes sewage, to be treated before discharging into the beel
- To discontinue land cutting, Brick Kilns and industrial development in the periphery of the beel
- Government settlements to be discontinued and the beel to be preserved to its natural state
- Encourage bird related eco-tourism and conservation education.

=== Bird sanctuary ===
Deepor Beel Bird Sanctuary covering an area of 414 ha within the larger spread of the beel to shelter several species of birds has been created by the Department of Forests, Assam, and shooting and bird-trapping are prohibited by law, but enforcement is reported to be inadequate. Over 120 species of birds have been listed in the sanctuary, including kingfishers, fishing eagles, adjutant storks and abundant varieties of ducks. A watch tower has been erected on the bank of the beel for bird watching and security purpose.

== Public participation ==
While the management authority for the beel is the Forest Department of the Government of Assam, with the Fisheries Department as the functional Authority, several public and private institutions and universities are involved in creating the awareness of the Ecological importance of the beel and the need to restore it to its original status. Some important ones are:

- The Ramsar Convention, which has recognised the Deepor Beel in its list of 1782 wetland sites, with 158 contracting parties to the convention of the world and holds seminars to create awareness of the beel's uniqueness.
- Aaranyak, a non-governmental organization set up "to foster conservation of biodiversity in Northeast India through research, environmental education, capacity building and advocacy for legal and policy reform to usher a new era of ecological security" is actively involved in Community Based Conservation Projects, which includes among other projects the "Deepar Beel Community Conservation Project". The project was designed "to reduce the anthropogenic pressure on the wetland by providing for alternative and diversified means of livelihood to the people living along the fringe villages. The purpose of the project is to set up some community run 'Self Help Groups' (SHGs) to strengthen their livelihood options through diverse means and garn their support in the conservation of Deepar Beel as wetland ecosystem."
- North Dakota State University, USA has a website created as a tool to facilitate better understanding of the concepts and practices in environmental management, and to complement the graduate course materials for the students, undertook a "Case Study of Deepor Beel Wetland Management" for the fall course of 2007.
- The Animal Ecology Laboratory in the Department of Zoology, Guwahati University has been involved in biological studies of the beel.
- Parangam Sarma Basistha, an architect and urban planner from Guwahati, have been involving in research on Impact of urbanisation in the wetland and worked for conservation of the Deepor Beel through the development of land use of the catchment areas.
- Chandan Kumar Duarah (Pratidin Group) and Mubina Akhtar, environmentalists have been studying and working for preservation of the wetland and published many reports.

=== Guwahati Water bodies (Preservation and Conservation) Bill, 2008 ===
The Guwahati Waterbodies (Preservation and Conservation) Bill, 2008 has been passed with the objective of preserving the wetland, minimising the problem of waterlogging in the city and creating an eco-friendly atmosphere. With this Bill at its command, the Government of Assam is planning to re-acquire land in the periphery of Deepor Beel, to undertake development projects, including water sports at the beel, and for this purpose a budgetary allocation of about US $3 million (Rs.12 crores) has been approved.

== See also ==
List of lakes of Assam
