= ASRA =

ASRA or Asra may refer to:

== Organizations ==
- Aberdeen Schools Rowing Association
- Alberta Science and Research Authority
- American Show Racer Association
- American Sportbike Racing Association
- Association for the Study of Reptilia and Amphibia
- Auckland Service Rifle Association
- Australasian Sound Recording Association
- Australian Sport Rotorcraft Association
- American Society of Regional Anesthesia and Pain Medicine

== Legislation ==
- Agricultural Services Reorganization Act
- American Sovereignty Restoration Act

== Other uses ==
- Austrian Sustainability Reporting Awards (founded 2000) founded by Christine Maria Jasch
- Benthophiloides turcomanus, a species of goby sometimes placed in its own genus Asra

== See also ==
- Aasra
- Asara (disambiguation)
- Azra (disambiguation)
