= Azara =

Azara may refer to:

== Places ==
- Azara, Huesca, Spain
- Azara, Misiones, Argentina
- Azara, Guwahati, Assam, India
  - Azara railway station
- Dorsum Azara, a ridge on the moon

== People ==
- Azara (name), list of people with the name

== Other uses ==
- Azara (plant), a genus of plants in the family Salicaceae
- Azara, an opera by John Knowles Paine
- El Azara (Arabic: العزارة), 3–13 February in the Berber calendar

== See also ==
- Azarah, an early Assyrian king
- Azra (disambiguation)
- Asara (disambiguation)
