= Azra (name) =

Azra is a female given name. In Turkish, Azra means untouched. The female name Azra comes from the Arabic language, from the word "ʿazrā" which means "virgin" or "pure".

Notable people with the name include:

== People ==
- Azra Aftab (born 1958), Pakistani actress
- Azra Akın (born 1981), Dutch-Turkish beauty pageant titleholder
- Azra Akıncı (born 2003), Turkish rhythmic gymnast
- Azra Aksamija, Bosnian-Austrian artist
- Azra Ali, Bangladeshi politician
- Azra Avdic (born 1998), Peruvian swimmer
- Azra Bašić (born 1959), Bosnian camp guard and war criminal
- Azra Bihorac (born 1965), Bosnian-American nephrologist and medical AI researcher
- Azra Dewan (born 2003), South African rhythmic gymnast
- Azra Duliman (born 1986), Miss Sweden of 2009
- Azra Erhat (1915–1982), Turkish author
- Azra Ghani, English epidemiologist
- Azra Hadzic (born 1994), Bosnian tennis player
- Azra Hasanbegović, Bosnian women's rights activist
- Azra Jafari (born 1978), Afghan politician
- Azra Jehan, Pakistani playback singer
- Azra Kanović (born 1993), Bosnian volleyball player
- Azra Sabir Khan (born 1945), Pakistani politician
- Azra Kolaković (1977–2017), real name of Donna Ares, Bosniak folk singer
- Azra Kohen (born 1979), Turkish writer
- Azra Mansoor, Pakistani actress
- Azra Meadows, Scottish lecturer of Pakistani descent
- Azra Mohyeddin (born 1977), Pakistani actress
- Azra Muranovic (born 1987), Swedish politician
- Azra Fazal Pechuho (born 1953), Pakistani politician
- Azra Quraishi (1945–2002), Pakistani botanist
- Azra Raza, Pakistani-American professor
- Azra Sherwani (1940–2005), Pakistani film actor
- Şule Azra Akbulut (born 2003), Turkish female karateka
