= British Show Racer =

Breed of pigeon

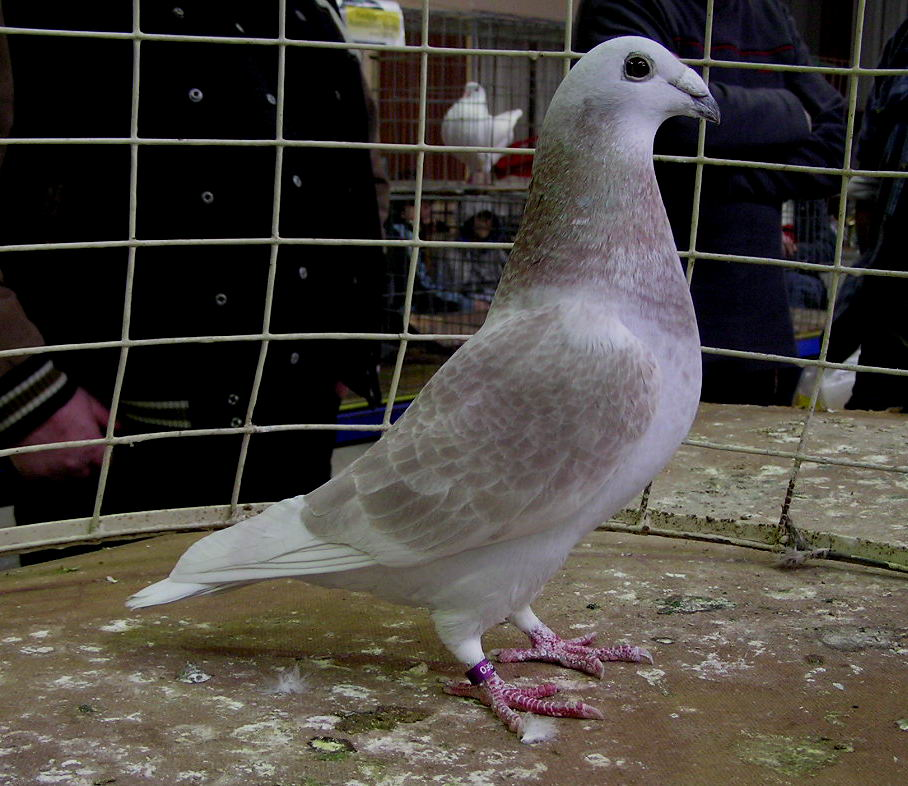
- British Show Racer
- Conservation status: Common
- Country of origin: United Kingdom

Classification
- US Breed Group: Fancy

The British Show Racer is a breed of fancy pigeon developed over many years of selective breeding. The British Show Racer along with other varieties of domesticated pigeons are all descendants from the rock pigeon (Columba livia). As the name suggests, this breed was developed as an exhibition breed in Britain from local stocks of racing pigeons. Douglas McClary in his book Pigeons for Everyone describes Show Racers as simply the "show version" of the popular racing pigeon.

== See also ==
- List of pigeon breeds
- American Show Racer
- German Beauty Homer
