= Azra =

Azra may refer to:

- Azra (band), a Yugoslav rock band popular in the 1980s
- Azra (album), the 1980 album by the band
- Azra (name), a female given name
- Azra (horse) (1889–1909), American Thoroughbred racehorse
- Azra District, a district of Logar Province, Afghanistan
- Azra (Into the Badlands), a city from the 2015–2019 American television series
- Azra, Lebanon, a village in the municipality of Azra wa el-Azr

== See also ==
- ASRA (disambiguation)
- Azara (disambiguation)
- Izra, a city in southern Syria
