= Islamic Cemetery in Altach =

Islamic cemetery in Austria

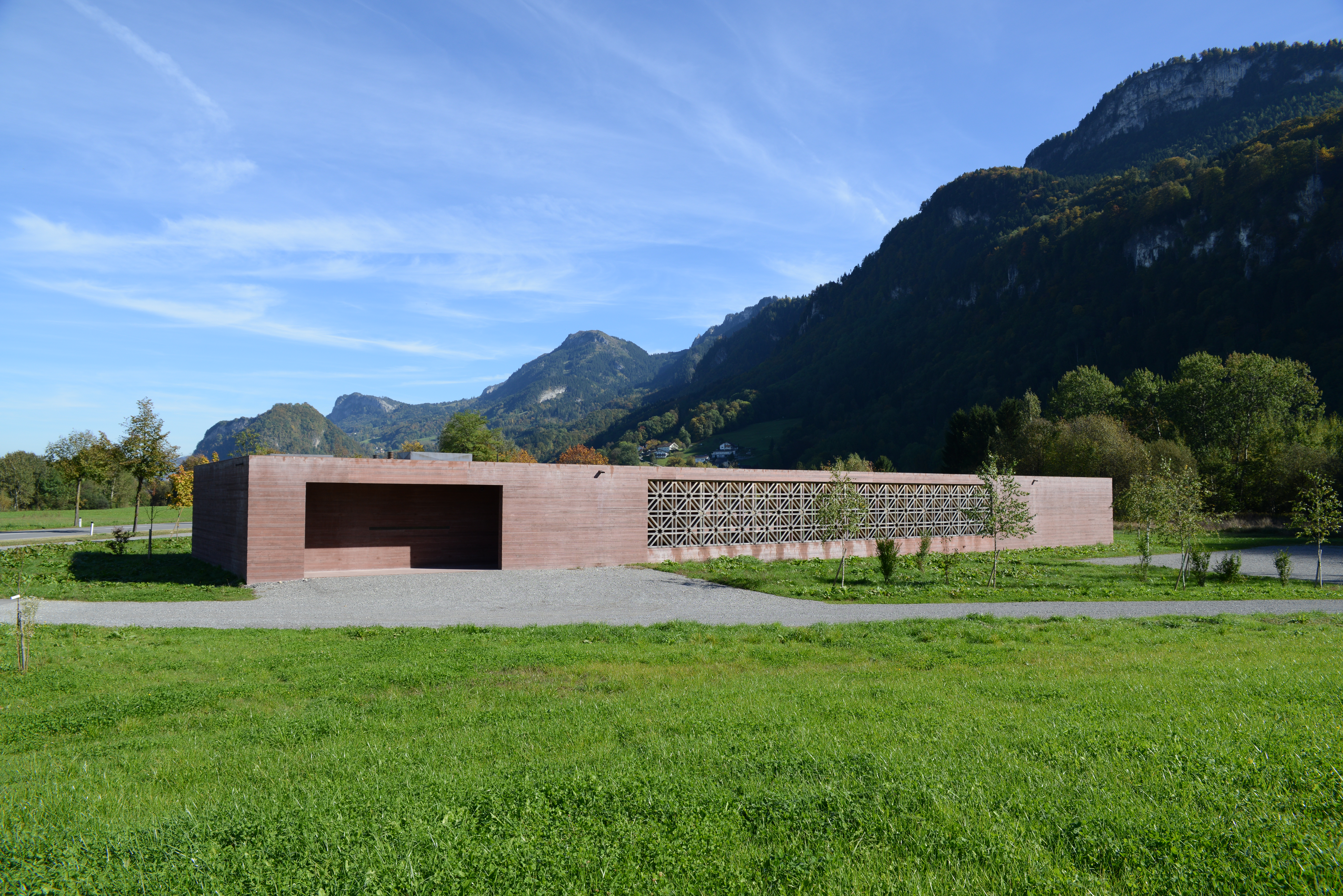
- The Islamic cemetery in Altach
- Interactive map of Islamic Cemetery in Altach

Details
- Established: 2012
- Location: Altach, Austria
- Coordinates: 47°20′45″N 9°39′50″E
- No. of graves: 728

The Islamic Cemetery in Altach is a cemetery in Altach, Austria. It has been awarded the Aga Khan Award for Architecture in 2013.

== History and construction ==
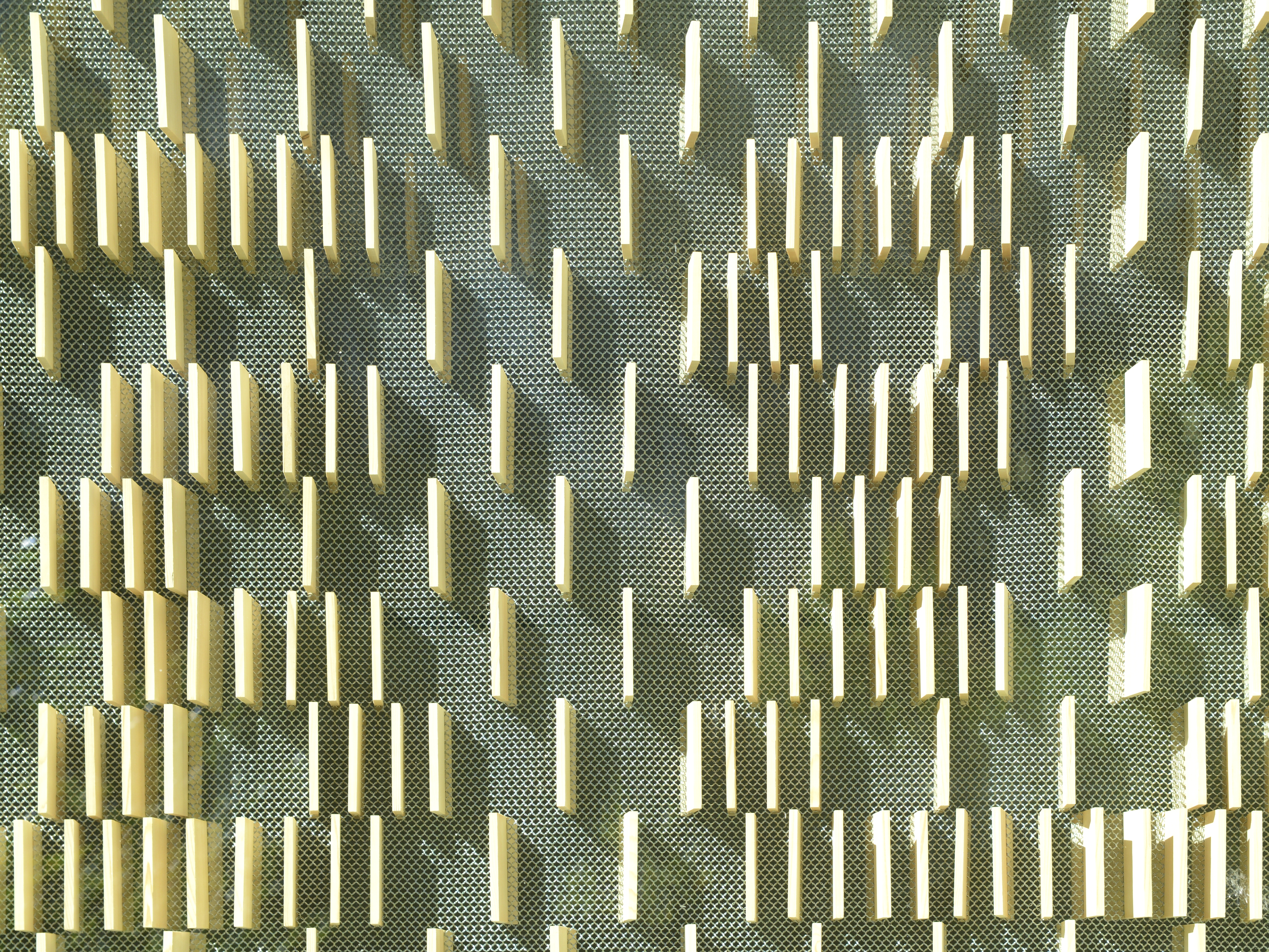
Design of the mihrab

It was designed by Austrian architect Bernardo Bader. Bader was chosen after an architectural competition was held. The project cost an estimated 2.3 million Euros. Azra Aksamija also worked on the project.

== Design ==
The qibla wall was created with a stainless steel mesh and wood shingles which create a calligraphic pattern spelling out Allah and Muhammad. The prayer rug, which extends over the entire room, was hand-woven in a weaving mill in Sarajevo.
