= Wellington Service Rifle Association =

New Zealand rifle club

- Abbreviation: WSRA
- Legal status: Sports Club
- Headquarters: Lower Hutt, New Zealand
- Location: Kaitoke, New Zealand
- Region served: Wellington, New Zealand
- Fields: Shooting Sports
- Affiliations: New Zealand Service Rifle Association
- Website: www.wsra.org.nz

The Wellington Service Rifle Association (or WSRA) is New Zealand's oldest active service rifle club. It is a member of the national New Zealand Service Rifle Association and holds shooting competitions for factory and service firearms.

== Competitions ==
WSRA holds a series of annual 'themed' competitions. The most popular attract competitors from around the country and sometimes from across the Tasman. WSRA are dedicated to the safe, competitive use of military firearms.

- Charles Upham Memorial Cavalry Champions Belt (military service rifles)
- Service Challenge (Incorporating the CU with shotgun and pistol events)
- Shotgun Special
- Best of Continental - ( FN FAL, Mauser rifles, Nagant, Swiss K31, AK-47 etc.)
- Best of Commonwealth - (Lee–Enfield, Ross rifle, L1A1 rifle)
- .22 rimfire action shoots Tactical Precision Match
- ANZAC Day
- Carbine Day
- Civilian Marksmanship Program
- Bolt Action Day
- Best of American - M1 carbine, Garand Rifle, M14 rifle, AR-15, Colt 1911 & Shotgun.
- Semi Auto day - AR-15, Steyr AUG, SKS carbine, AK-47, M14 rifle, M1 Garand
- Two Gun (Shotgun and rifle)
- Red Star day ( Nagant, SKS carbine, AK-47 rifles)
- .303 Day
- 3 Gun
- Long range steel plate shoots out to 1000 yards
- Din Collings Trophy (military service rifle with iron sights and bayonet)

== Memberships ==
WSRA is a member of the New Zealand Service Rifle Association (NZSRA). Before the establishment of NZSRA, WSRA was an active member of gun-rights lobby group the Council of Licensed Firearms Owners (COLFO). Since NZSRA's establishment WSRA members are members of COLFO via NZSRA.
