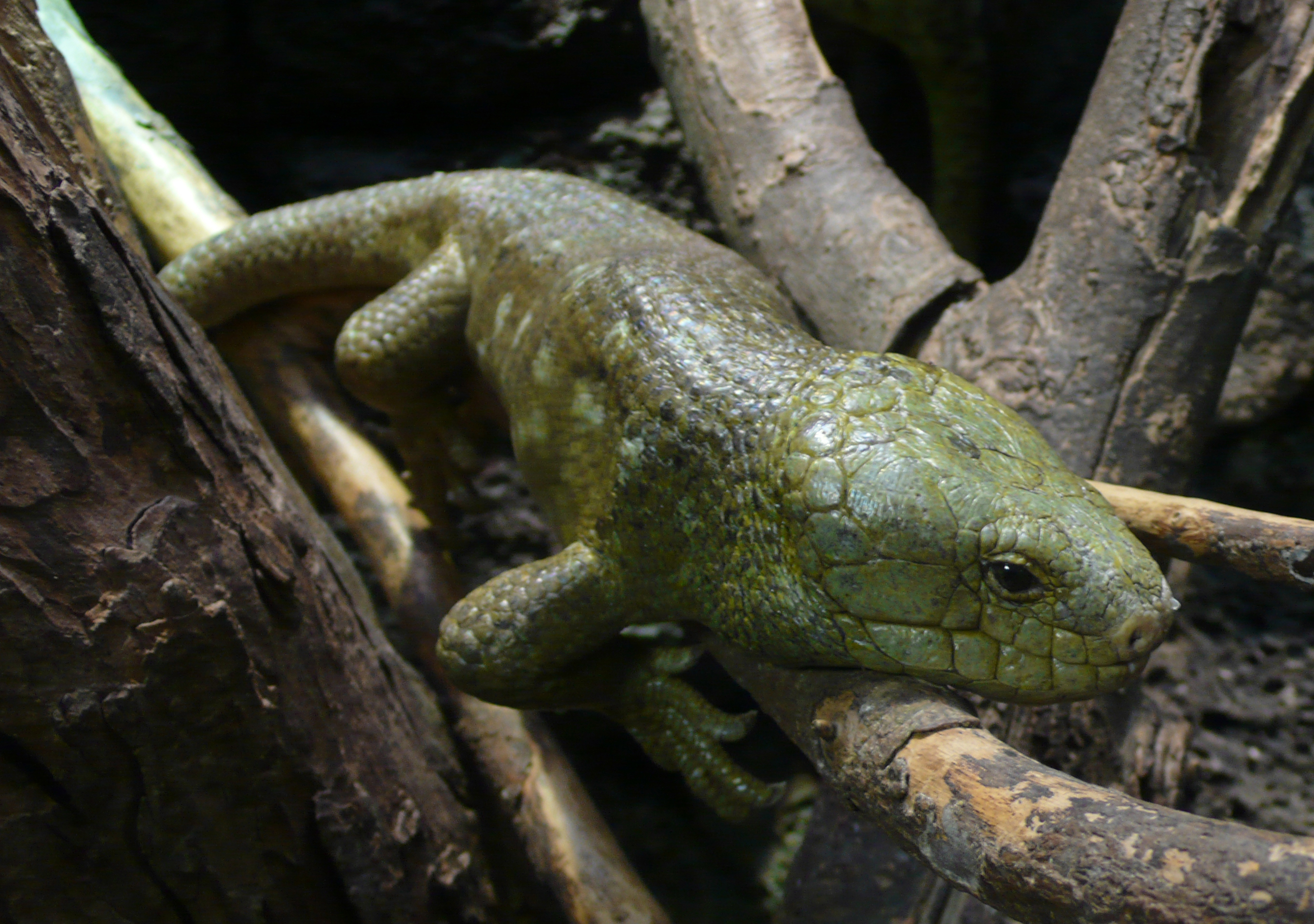

Conservation status
- Near Threatened (IUCN 3.1)
- CITES Appendix II

Scientific classification
- Kingdom: Animalia
- Phylum: Chordata
- Class: Reptilia
- Order: Squamata
- Family: Scincidae
- Genus: Corucia; Gray, 1855
- Species: C. zebrata

Binomial name
- Corucia zebrata Gray, 1855

= Solomon Islands skink =

Species of lizard

The Solomon Islands skink (Corucia zebrata), also known as prehensile-tailed skink, monkey-tailed skink, giant skink, zebra skink, and monkey skink, is an arboreal species of skink endemic to the Solomon Islands archipelago. It is the largest known extant species of skink.

The Solomon Islands skink is completely herbivorous, eating many different fruits and vegetables including the pothos plant. It is one of the few species of reptile known to function within a social group or circulus. Both male and female specimens are known to be territorial and often hostile towards members not a part of their family group.

Corucia is a monotypic genus, containing a single species. However, in 1997 it was determined that there are two subspecies of the Solomon Islands skink: the common monkey-tailed skink (Corucia zebrata zebrata) and the northern monkey-tailed skink (Corucia zebrata alfredschmidti). Among other variances, the northern skink is smaller and has darker eyes with a black sclera.

Extensive logging is a serious threat to the survival of this species. Consumption for food by indigenous Solomon Islanders and excessive pet trade exports have affected wild populations. Export of this species from the Solomon Islands is now restricted and the animal is protected under CITES appendix II.

== Taxonomy and etymology ==
The Solomon Islands skink was first described by John Edward Gray in 1855 as Corucia zebrata. The generic name Corucia derives from the Latin word coruscus meaning "shimmering". This is in reference to Gray's description of "a play of colors effect from the body scales". Its specific name zebrata is a Latinized form of the word zebra, in reference to the animal's zebra-like stripes. Some of its common names (prehensile-tailed skink, monkey-tailed skink, monkey skink) refer to its fully prehensile tail which the species uses as a fifth limb for climbing.

Although appearances of Solomon Island skinks vary from island to island, only one subspecies, from the western islands of the Solomons Archipelago, was described by Dr. Gunther Köhler in 1996 as C. z. alfredschmidti, the trinomial name of which is in honor of German amateur herpetologist Alfred A. Schmidt.

The closest living relatives of C. zebrata are the blue-tongued skinks of the genus Tiliqua and skinks of the genus Egernia of Australia, New Guinea, and Indonesia, all of which are also assigned to the subfamily Lygosominae.

== Distribution and habitat ==
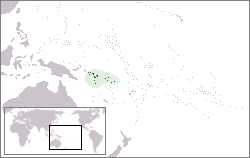
Map of the Solomon Islands archipelago

The Solomon Islands skink is native to Papua New Guinea, and the Solomon Islands archipelago, a group of islands in the south-west Pacific Ocean. The common subspecies (C. z. zebrata) is found on the islands of Choiseul, New Georgia, Santa Isabel, Guadalcanal, Nggela, Malaita, Makira, Ugi and Owaraha. The northern subspecies (C. z. alfredschmidti) is known from the islands of Bougainville and Buka and the Shortland Islands. Bougainville and Buka are geographically part of the Solomons Archipelago, though politically part of Papua New Guinea. Both subspecies of the Solomon Islands skink are strictly arboreal, usually inhabiting the upper canopy of forested areas throughout its range. The adults commonly establish a territory within the canopy of one tree. It commonly occurs in the strangler fig tree (Ficus sp.), provided the epiphytic growth of its several food plants are present. It occurs in trees in semi-cleared areas and cultivated food gardens, again provided its food plants occur there.

== Biology ==
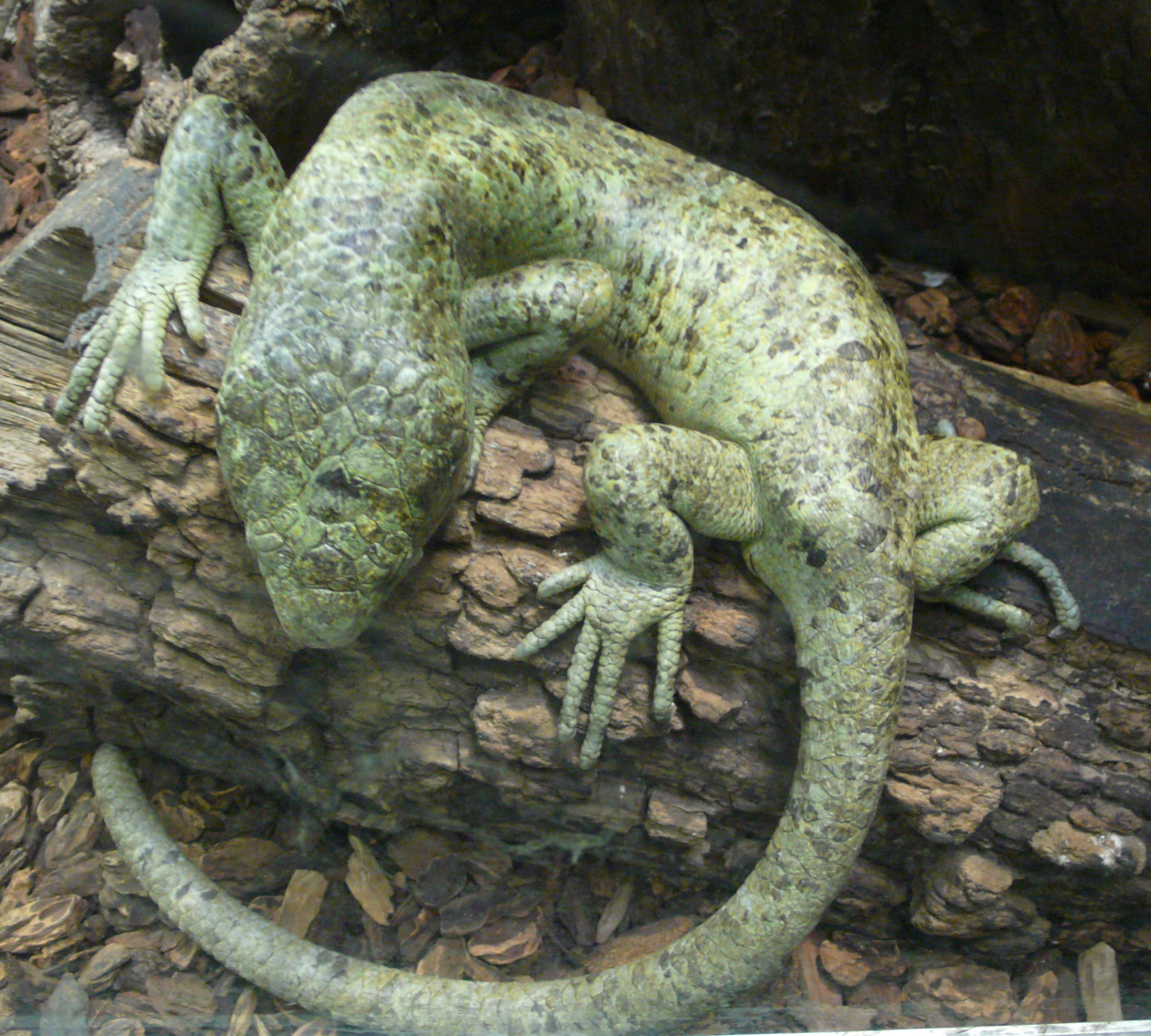
Solomon Islands skink at the St Louis Zoo

The Solomon Islands skink is the world's largest species of extant skink; adults can reach a total length (including tail) of 32 inches (81 cm) when fully grown, with the tail accounting for more than half this length.

The Solomon Islands skink has a long, slender body, strong, short legs, and a triangular shaped head with small round eyes. The skink has a strong crushing jaw but the teeth are small and used for eating plant material. Its prehensile tail helps it maneuver from branch to branch with ease and gives the skink its more common names: monkey-tailed skink, prehensile-tailed skink, or monkey skink. Male Solomon Islands skinks tend to have a broader head and a more slender body shape than female skinks. Males have a V-shaped pattern of scales just aft of the cloacal opening, which is not present in female skinks.

The scales of Solomon Islands skinks are a dark green but are often speckled with light brown or black. The scales on the underside vary from light yellow to different shades of green. The toes on all four legs have thick, curved nails used for climbing and gripping tree limbs.

As a crepuscular animal, it is most active during the dusk and dawn hours, feeding primarily at dusk. it also is active and eats during the hours of dawn, though to a lesser extent. It has quite good eyesight and relies upon it to identify threats, as well as potential food. It relies heavily on its sense of smell and uses it to identify its territory and other members of its group, called a circulus. Like snakes, the skink "smells" by flicking its tongue to gather scents and when the tongue is retracted, it touches it to the opening of a Jacobson's organ at the roof of its mouth.

=== Subspecies ===
The common Solomon Islands skink (C. z. zebrata) has a white sclera with its eyes while the northern Solomon Islands skink (C. z. alfredschmidti) has a black sclera. The iris of the northern Solomon Islands skink is a mix of green and yellow whereas the iris of the common Solomon Islands skink can vary from several different shades of green to orange to a dark black. According to Dr. Gunther Köhler, who described the northern subspecies, this subspecies possesses "larger dorsal and ventral scales" and has "seven instead of usually five parietal scales".

The northern Solomon Islands skink is the shorter of the two subspecies with males averaging 24 inches (61 cm) and females averaging 22 inches (56 cm) in total length. The common Solomon Islands skinks are slightly longer with the males averaging 28 inches (71 cm) and the females averaging 24 inches (61 cm) in total length. The common Solomon Islands skink, at 850 grams (1.87 lb), weighs more than the northern Solomon Islands skink, which weighs closer to 500 grams (1.1 lb).

=== Diet ===
Solomon Islands skinks are herbivores, feeding on the leaves, flowers, fruit, and growing shoots of several different species of plants. This includes the somewhat toxic (due to high concentrations of calcium oxalate) Epipremnum pinnatum (cf. E. aureum) plant, (Note: University of Nebraska (2006) "Plants which contain oxalate salts produce mucous membrane irritation and pain and/or swelling of mouth, lips, tongue, esophagus and stomach.") which the lizard eats without ill effect. (Note: Satter (2007) "note that it tends to turn their feces reddish in color".) Juvenile skinks often eat feces from adults in order to acquire the essential microflora to digest their food. Newborn skinks have been observed consuming their placental sac after birth and will not feed on other food for the first two days. A study done in 2000 showed that this species still exhibits a feed response based on chemical cues from insects. It is believed that this is an ancestral trait that these skinks have retained, though it is not used in the wild.

=== Reproduction ===
The Solomon Islands skink is one of the few species of reptile that lives in a communal group known as a circulus. The Solomon Islands skink reproduces by viviparous matrotrophy: (Note: "Matrotrophy is the nourishment of embryos by resources provided between fertilization and parturition.") the female provides a placenta for its young, which are born after a gestation period of six to eight months; this is a rare trait among reptiles. The newborn skink is of a large size compared to its mother; the northern Solomon Islands skinks are approximately 29 centimetres (11 in) in length and weigh 80 grams (0.18 lb), whereas the common Solomon Islands skinks are 30 centimetres (12 in) and 175 grams (0.386 lb) when they are born. This reduced size disparity led the former curator of reptiles at the Philadelphia Zoo, Dr. Kevin Wright, to compare it to "a human mother giving birth to a six year–old". Almost all births are single babies, but occasionally twins will be born. At least one instance of triplets has occurred according to herpetologist Bert Langerwerf.

The newborn skink will stay within its circulus for six to twelve months during which time it will be protected by not only its parents but other unrelated adult skinks within the group. Around one year of age, sometimes earlier, the juvenile will move off to form a new family group. Individuals have been documented to stay within the group for several births without being expelled, however. Females exhibit fierce protective behavior around the time of birth; this protectiveness of young is a rare occurrence in reptiles but is shorter in duration when compared to the protective behavior exhibited by a typical mammal.

== Conservation ==
=== Threats ===
Extensive logging is a serious ongoing threat to the survival of this species, as is consumption for food by native people, and export demand for the pet trade. Because of the large numbers of lizards that were being exported for the pet trade, the small region to which the skink is native, and its low reproductive rate, in 1992 Corucia zebrata was listed as a CITES Appendix II animal, which allows limits to be placed on the number of animals in commercial trade between countries.

Since there is no regulation on the rapid deforestation occurring in the Solomon Islands, limited export to recognized institutions may be needed to aid this species in genetic diversity for its survival via ex situ breeding programs. According to herpetologists who study the Solomon Islands skink, such as Dr. David Kirkpatrick and Dr. Kevin Wright, captive breeding alone is not practical as a sole method of species survival due to the limited number of offspring and long gestation periods.

=== In captivity ===
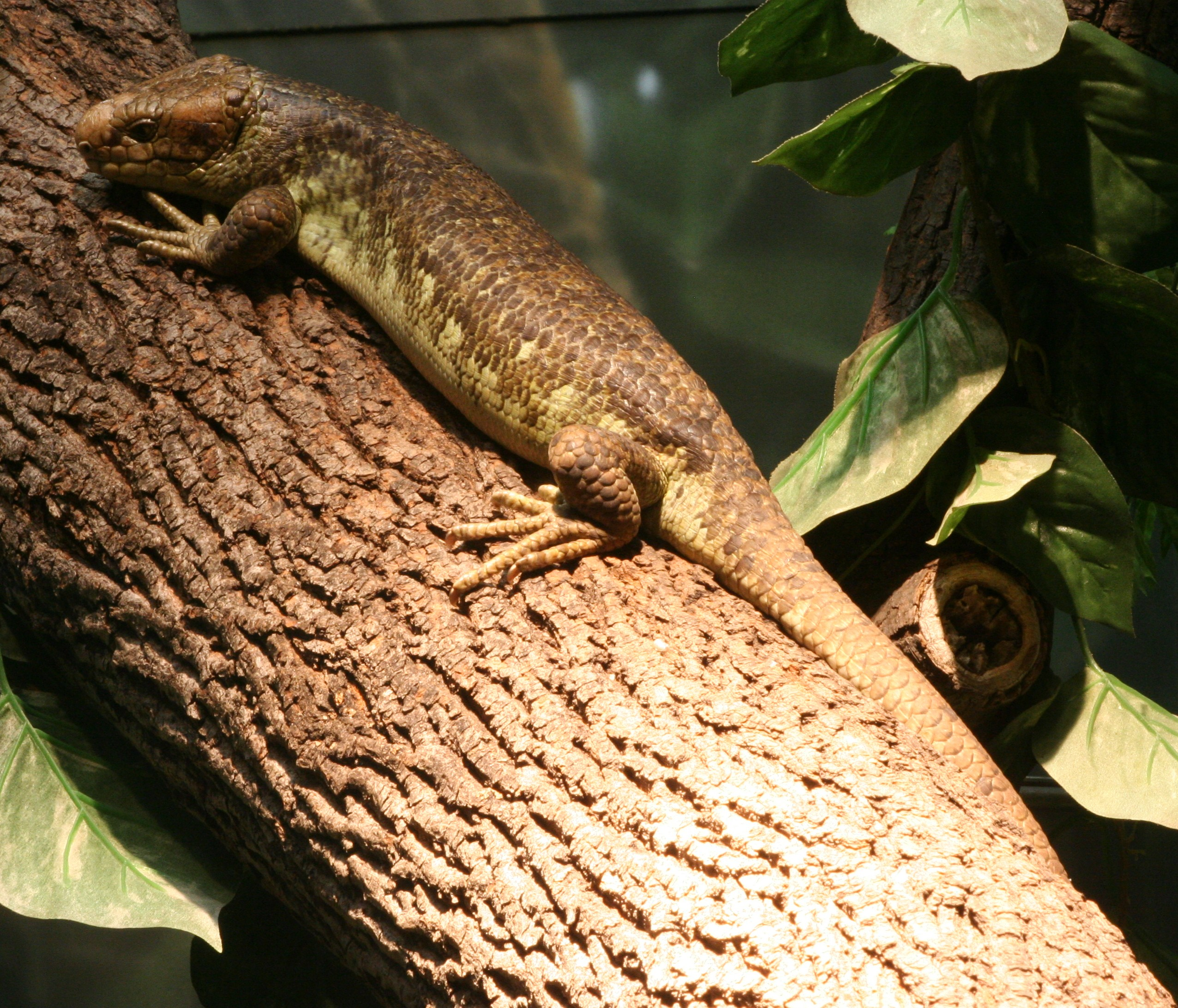
Solomon Islands skink at the Buffalo Zoo

The Solomon Islands skink is represented in both public and private collections. The Philadelphia Zoo has bred this species of skink over multiple generations for the past 40 years. The keeping of the Solomon Islands skink in captivity is not without its challenges: as it is a large arboreal tropical animal. It requires a large arboreal enclosure, with a constant temperature between 75–80 degrees Fahrenheit (24–27 degrees Celsius), with heat being provided from above as well as below, allowing the skink to bask in the heat from above as it would during dusk, while providing a radiant heat from below to aid digestion. The dynamics of the skink's circulus means that not all groups do well when new animals are introduced. Despite successful breeding programs, its somewhat unusual nature of single births and slow growth has made these programs challenging.

Biologist Michael Balsai of Temple University has noted a significant number of breedings between skinks from different islands has resulted in non-productive unions. Balsai's theory is that there are enough differences between animals from different islands that pairing of lizards from different locales will be unproductive, further frustrating many captive breeding attempts.
