= Palasbari =

- town
- Location in Assam, India Palasbari (India)
- Coordinates: 26.13°N 91.5°E
- Country: India
- State: Assam
- District: Kamrup

Government
  - Body: Palasbari Municipality Board
- Elevation: 46 m (151 ft)

Population (2001)
  - Total: 4,741

Languages
  - Official: Assamese
- Time zone: UTC+5:30 (IST)
- Postal code: 781128
- ISO 3166 code: IN-AS
- Vehicle registration: AS

Palasbari (Pron:ˌpəlæsˈbɑːrɪ) is a town and a municipal board in Kamrup district in the Indian state of Assam. There was a small Kachari kingdom near Palasbari Heramdoi.

== Demographics ==
As of 2001 India census, Palasbari had a population of 4741. Males constitute 51% of the population and females 49%. Palasbari has an average literacy rate of 80%, higher than the national average of 59.5%: male literacy is 85%, and female literacy is 75%. In Palasbari, 9% of the population is under 6 years of age. Palasbari is The 3rd town of Assam state. Currently, industrialization is taking place in and around Palasbari which has given a new impetus to this old town.

== Geography ==
Palasbari is located at 26.13°N 91.5°E. It has an average elevation of 46 metres (150 feet).

== Politics ==
Palasbari is part of Gauhati (Lok Sabha constituency). The people of Palasbari are traditionally well known for their political consciousness. Rationality is a major trait among the folk of this town.

== See also ==
- Chaygaon
- Jalukbari
- Dharapur
- Mirza
