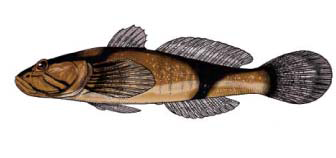
- B. brauneri

Scientific classification
- Kingdom: Animalia
- Phylum: Chordata
- Class: Actinopterygii
- Order: Gobiiformes
- Family: Gobiidae
- Subfamily: Gobiinae
- Genus: Benthophiloides; Beling & Iljin, 1927

Type species
- Benthophiloides brauneri Beling & Iljin, 1927

Synonyms
- Asra Iljin, 1941

= Benthophiloides =

Genus of fishes

Benthophiloides is a genus of gobies widespread in the basins of the Black Sea and the Caspian Sea.

== Species ==
There are currently two recognized species in this genus:

- Benthophiloides brauneri Beling & Iljin, 1927
- Benthophiloides turcomanus (Iljin, 1941)
