= Charles Upham Memorial Cavalry Champions Belt =

New Zealand rifle target shooting competition

The Charles Upham Memorial Cavalry Champions Belt is a rifle target shooting competition for Military Issue rifles. It dates back to at least 1871. The competition is hosted by the Wellington Service Rifle Association. It is New Zealand's second oldest competition, the oldest being the Ballinger Belt, also a shooting competition.

Tradition has the winner of the belt carried around the range by a group of his/her peers in the NRA Cavalry Champions Chair. This honour is considered an exceptional part of being a belt winner.

Popular rifles used are the 1896 Swedish Mauser, the entire range of Lee–Enfield .303 rifles, and the American AR-15 family of rifles.

Strict rules govern not only the firearm, but also ammunition specifications. An OPEN class division allows competitors to compete with any sporting or modified military rifles and open class is essentially, anything is allowed. The competition comprises both precision and rapid fire events at distances from 100–500 yards (91–457 m).

The belt itself is a leather belt, approximately 2 meters long by 100mm wide and is covered with silver buckles and badges dating from the 1870s to the present.

== List of winners ==
- 1872. Won by Sargt. T.D. Cummins, Wanganui Cavalry Volunteers.
- 1873. Won by Capt. Arch Douglas, Waiuku Cavalry Volunteers.
- 1874. Won by Sun Lieut. Barriball, Waiuku Cavalry Volunteers.
- 1875. Won by Arthur Von Poellnitz, Mounted Constable, Auckland Constabulary.
- 1876. Won by Gunner Thomas Bell, Auckland Battery, Artillery Volunteers.
- 1877. Won by Seaman John McJean, Auckland Naval Brigade.
- 1878. Won by Petty Officer J.A. Gordon, Thames Naval Brigade.
- 1879. Won by Petty Officer J.A.Gordon, Thames Naval Brigade.
- 1880. Won by Petty Officer A.Thomas, Thames Naval Brigade.
- 1881. Won by Petty Officer W. Armstrong, Thames Naval Brigade.
- 1882. Won by Lieut. J.A. Gordon, Thames Naval Brigade.

At this point the belt was presented to Lieutenant Gordon and was kept by his family until, following the death of Captain Charles Upham, VC and Bar, the belt was renamed the 'Charles Upham Memorial Cavalry Champions Belt' and was formally put back into competition.

- 1985. Won by Chester Burt, Ashhurst.
- 1986. Won by M. Buchanan, NSW.
- 1987. Won by Diane Collins, Te Puke.
- 1988. Won by John R. Whiteman, Upper Hutt.
- 1989. Won by K. T. Meade, Petone.
- 1990. Won by G.Hahn, Australia.
- 1991. Won by G.W. Berman, Mossman Neutral Bay, Australia.
- 1992. Won by M. Sweet, Tasmania, Australia.
- 1993. Won by R.A.G. Collings, Karori.
- 1994. Won by A.J. Luckman, Great Britain.
- 1995. Won by S.Regan, Cheltenam.
- 1996. Won by Staff Sergeant N.G. Podovinsky, 1RNZIR
- 1997. Won by Gordon Fund, National Rifle Association, Australia.
- 1998. Won by Warrant Officer Phil Chalmers, 1BLB, RNZALR.
- 1999. Won by Staff Sergeant Greg Beer, RNZALR.
- 2000. Won by Jason Davis, Wellington Service Rifle Association.
- 2001. Won by Peter Miles, NZ Service Rifle Association.
- 2002. Won by Enrico Hoover, WSRA, NZPA, NZSRA. NZMSC.
- 2003. Won by Enrico Hoover, WSRA, NZPA, NZSRA. NZMSC.
- 2004. Won by Enrico Hoover, WSRA, NZPA, NZSRA. NZMSC.
- 2005. Won by Frank Boysens, ASRA.
- 2006. Won by Frank Boysens, ASRA.
- 2007. Won by Colin Welch, WSRA.
- 2008. Won by Jamie Falconer, WSRA.
- 2009. Won by Matt Shelton, WSRA.
- 2010. Won by Jamie Falconer, WSRA.
- 2011. Won by Matt Shelton, WSRA.
- 2012.
- 2013.
- 2014.
- 2015. Won by Jamie Falconer. WSRA.
- 2016.
- 2017.
- 2018. Won by Jason Davis, WSRA.
- 2019. Won by Ralph Cerecke, WSRA.
- 2020. Won by Kevin Haskell.
- 2021. Won by Kevin Haskell.
- 2022.
- 2023. Won by G. Jordan.
- 2024. Won by G. Jordan.
- 2025. Won by Kevin Haskell.
- 2026. Won by C. Bailey.
- 2027.

Open Class winners. 2000. Jason Davis, WSRA. 2001. 2002. 2003. 2004. T. Ryan. 2005. 2006. Matt Shelton. 2007. Jason Davis. 2008. Enrico Hoover. WSRA, PNZ. NZSRA. NZMSC. 2009. Enrico Hoover. WSRA, PNZ. NZSRA. NZMSC. 2010. Enrico Hoover. WSRA, PNZ. NZSRA. NZMSC. 2011. 2012. 2013. 2014. 2015. Don Wood. 2016. 2017. 2018. 2019. Adam Bowers. 2020. Matt Shelton. 2021. Nicholas H. 2022. 2023. Nicholas H. 2024. 2025. Richard Cleghorn. 2026. Richard Cleghorn.

Classic Class. 2020. Malcolm Gillice. 2021. Jason Davis. 2022. 2023. Jamie Falconer. 2024. Carrington. 2025. 2026. B. Carrington.
