= Dharapur =

- city
- Location in Assam, India Dharapur (India)
- Coordinates: 26°08′14″N 91°37′40″E
- Country: India
- State: Assam
- District: Kamrup Metropolitan

Population (2001)
  - Total: 7,668

Languages
  - Official: Assamese
- Time zone: UTC+5:30 (IST)
- ISO 3166 code: IN-AS
- Vehicle registration: AS

Dharapur is a census town in Kamrup Metropolitan district in the state of Assam, India.

== Demographics ==
As of the 2001 India census, Dharapur had a population of 7668. Males constitute 54% of the population and females 46%. Dharapur has an average literacy rate of 71%, which is higher than the national average of 59.5%; male literacy is 74% and female literacy is 67%. In Dharapur, 10% of the population is under 6 years of age.

== See also ==
- Jalukbari
- Azara
- Pandu
- Palasbari
