= Asara (disambiguation) =

Asara may refer to:

- Asara, a town in Iran
  - Asara Rural District
  - Asara District
- Asara, India, a village in Uttar Pradesh, India
- Asara, a river cruise ship involved in a COVID-19 outbreak on the Nile River in Egypt, see 2020 coronavirus outbreak on cruise ships

== See also ==
- Aasara
- Aasra
- ASRA (disambiguation)
- Azara (disambiguation)
