= Christine Maria Jasch =

Austrian economist, author and non-fiction writer

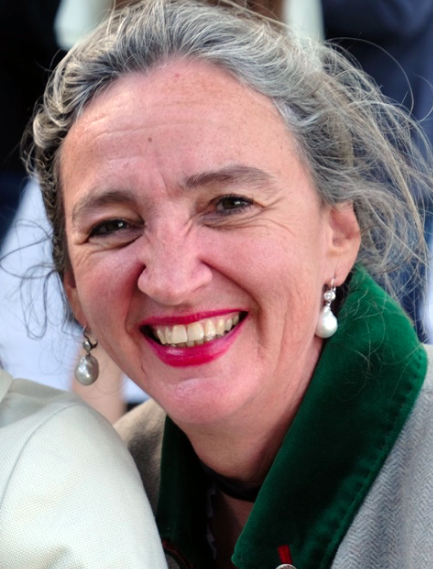
Christine Jasch (2015)

Christine Maria Jasch (born 7 November 1960 in Vienna) is an Austrian economist, author and accountant.

== Life and career ==
Christine Jasch completed secondary school in Vienna, where she matriculated in 1979 to study at the University of Vienna's Department of Economics, and at the University of Natural Resources and Life Sciences, Vienna. In 1984 she applied for a Studium Irregulare for Ecological Economics. She became a certified public accountant in 1989 and a lead verifier according to the EU EMAS Regulation in 1995. In 1989 she founded the Vienna Institute for Environmental Management and Economics, IÖW. In 1999, she habilitated (qualified for professorship) in Environmental Management and Economics at the Austrian University for Agriculture. Since 2011 she has been responsible for the auditing of sustainability reports and certification of environmental management systems for Ernst & Young Climate Change and Sustainability Services, Vienna.

== Research and teaching ==
Jasch's work focuses on the combination of environmental and sustainability issues with economic instruments, including environmental cost accounting and sustainability reporting. Her IÖW work has included methodological development as well as practical implementation guidelines for environmental management tools.

Working areas include environmental and sustainability accounting, material flow cost accounting, ISO standardization for environmental management, and sustainability reporting.

On behalf of the Austrian environmental ministry since 1993 she negotiated the ISO standards ISO 14001 environmental management systems, ISO 14031 Environmental Performance Evaluation and ISO 14041 Material Flow Cost Accounting.

In 2000, she founded the Austrian Sustainability Reporting Awards (ASRA).

From 2000 to 2006 she was a member of the United Nations Working Group on Environmental Management Accounting. For them she wrote a book on principles and procedures for environmental management accounting, which was the basis for her later work on the IFAC Guidance document on environmental management accounting, released in 2005. UNIDO has adopted this approach in combination with cleaner technologies and environmental management systems.. In Austria the national law for the implementation of the EU emission trading scheme requests a separately qualified accounting expert for data monitoring in the audit team, in addition to a process engineer and a chemist. Christine Jasch qualified as such in 2005 and works on CO_{2} audits with TUEV Austria. In April 2008 she was voted into the board of directors of oekostrom AG where she served until 2013.

She has lectured at several Austrian universities and universities of applied sciences.

== Books ==
- "Environmental Management Accounting for Cleaner Production", Schaltegger, S., Bennett, M., Burritt, R.L., Jasch, C.M. (Eds.) Springer 2008, ISBN 978-1-4020-8913-8
- "Life Cycle Design A Manual for Small and Medium-Sized Enterprises", Behrendt, S., Jasch, C., Peneda, M.C., Weenen, H. van (Eds.), Springer 1997, ISBN 978-3-642-64551-8
