= Azra Ali =

Bangladeshi politician

Member of Bangladesh Parliament
- In office 7 March 1973 – 6 November 1976

Personal details
- Political party: Awami League

Azra Ali (Bengali: আজরা আলী) is a Awami League politician and the former member of the Bangladesh Parliament for a women's reserved seat.

== Career ==
Ali was elected to parliament from a women's reserved seat as an Awami League candidate in 1973.
