= Azara, Huesca =

Coordinates: 42°04′N 0°02′W

Azara
- Municipality
- Flag Coat of arms

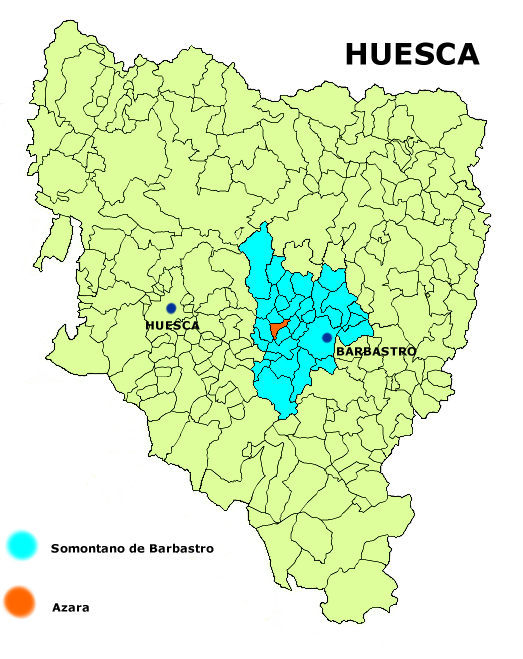
- Country: ESP
- Comarca: Somontano de Barbastro
- Province: Huesca

Government
  - Mayor: Jerónimo Santos Larroya Domper ( PSOE-Aragón )

Area
  - Total: 14.49 km^{2} (5.59 sq mi)
- Elevation: 429 m (1,407 ft)

Population (2025-01-01)
  - Total: 167
- Postal code: 22311

Azara is a municipality in the province of Huesca, Spain. In 2018, it had a population of 174 inhabitants. It is located in the middle of a valley named after Alferche, to the right of the La Clamor Canyon, surrounded by sandstone the highest among which is Peña de Santa Margarita, 40 km away from Huesca.

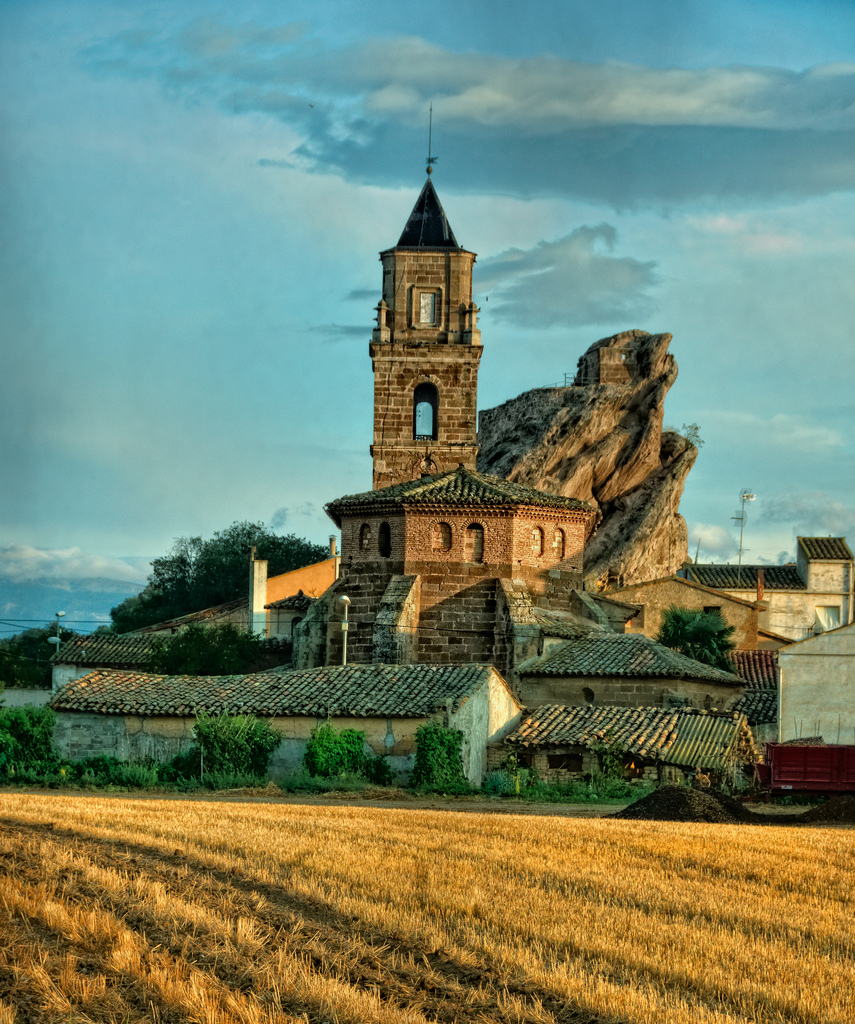
Church in Azara

== Administration ==
=== Recent Mayors of Azara ===
Period	Mayor	Party
1979-1983		
1983-1987		
1987-1991		
1991-1995		
1995-1999		
1999-2003		
2003-2007	Santos Larroya Domper	PSOE-Aragón
2007-2011		PSOE-Aragón
2011-2015	Jerónimo Santos Larroya Domper	PSOE-Aragón

=== Electoral results ===
Municipal Elections
Party	2003	2007	2011
Partido de los Socialistas de Aragón	4	3	3
Partido Popular de Aragón (PP)	1	2	2
PAR			-
CHA	-	-	
Total	5	5	5

== Demography ==
Demographic evolution
1900	1910	1930	1940	1950	1960	1970	1981	1986	1992	1999	2004
491	441	441	380	308	363	310	269	237	225	224	200

== Monuments ==
- The Santa Lucia Church
- Peña/Piedra Santa Margarita (Azara) was an old castle belonging to Arabs. For lieutenant it had to Barbatuerta immediately after the reconquista (1101-4), and in times of Labaña (1610) it belonged to Sanjuanistas de Barbastro.

== Feasts ==
- Major feast is celebrated from 13 December to 16 December in honour of Santa Lucía.
- Easter Monday.
- Cultural Days of June.

== See also ==
- List of municipalities in Huesca
