= Azara railway station =

Railway station in Assam, India

Azara

General information
- Location: Guwahati, Assam; India
- Coordinates: 26.1021°N 91.6166°E
- Elevation: 52 metres (171 ft)
- System: Indian Railways station
- Owner: Indian Railways
- Platforms: 2
- Tracks: 4
- Connections: Auto stand

Construction
- Structure type: Standard (on-ground station)
- Parking: No
- Cycle facilities: No

Other information
- Status: Active
- Station code: AZA
- Zone(s): Northeast Frontier Railways
- Division(s): Rangiya
Location
- Location within Assam Location within India

Azara Railway Station is a small railway station in Azara, Guwahati, Assam. Its code is AZA. It serves Guwahati City. The station consists of 2 platforms.
