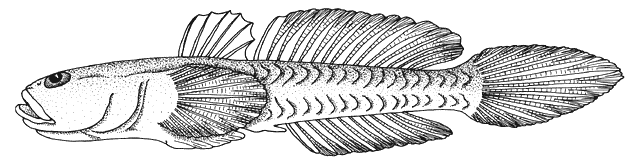

Scientific classification
- Kingdom: Animalia
- Phylum: Chordata
- Class: Actinopterygii
- Order: Gobiiformes
- Family: Gobiidae
- Genus: Benthophiloides
- Species: B. turcomanus

Binomial name
- Benthophiloides turcomanus (Iljin, 1941)

Synonyms
- Asra turcomanus Iljin, 1941

= Benthophiloides turcomanus =

Species of fish

Benthophiloides turcomanus is a tiny species of gobiid fish native to the Caspian Sea. It is only known from two specimens collected from the waters of Turkmenistan at a depth of 27 metres (89 ft). The specimens, no longer than 3 centimetres (1.2 in) TL, have since been lost.
