= New Zealand Service Rifle Association =

Sports governing body in New Zealand

The New Zealand Service Rifle Association (NZSRA) is New Zealand's national organising body of service rifle competition. NZSRA promotes service rifle shooting, sets rules for service rifle competition, holds annual national championships, and supports the ownership of service rifles.

== History ==
People have been shooting military rifles at targets for at least 150 years. Much of this activity ended up as the strictly deliberate target shooting of the NRA. Those who wanted to shoot authentically configured military rifles at targets but with more action than NRA shooting initiated Service Rifle shooting. Several clubs in NZ were doing this in an uncoordinated way. In late 1997, the International Military Arms Society Inc, based in Auckland and Wellington Service Rifle Association formed the New Zealand Service Rifle Association Inc. A joint set of rules and matches was written and called the Service Match Code, now in its fourth edition. Currently the main clubs running exclusively Service Rifle matches are Wellington Service Rifle Association Inc (WSRA) and Auckland Service Rifle Association Inc (ASRA). Other clubs (BOPSRA, Waikato Rifle, Bruce Rifle Club, Canterbury group) also run SR matches as part of their overall program.

== Service Match Code ==
The Service Match Code (SMC v 4.0) sets out the rules for service rifle competition.

== Member clubs ==
The following clubs are members of the NZSRA:

- Auckland Service Rifle Association (ASRA).
- Wellington Service Rifle Association (WSRA).
- Central North Island Gun Club Association (CNIGC).

== Memberships ==
NZSRA is a member of the Council of Licensed Firearms Owners (COLFO).
