= Azara, Guwahati =

Azara
- Neighbourhood
- Location in Assam Location in India
- Coordinates: 26.123515°N 91.617078°E
- Country: India
- State: Assam
- District: Kamrup Metropolitan district
- City: Guwahati
- Time zone: UTC+5:30 (IST)
- PIN: 781 XXX
- Vehicle registration: AS-01
- Lok Sabha constituency: Gauhati
- Vidhan Sabha constituency: Gauhati West

Azara is a locality in the western part of Guwahati.

== Geography ==
Located about 5 kilometres (3.1 mi) from Guwahati Airport, it is surrounded by the localities of Borjhar and Jalukbari, and bounded by Dipor Bil to its east.

== Location ==
Azara Post Office (established in the oldest building of the locality) covers the area up to Chakardeo towards the east, Greenland Nursing Home towards the south, Dharapur towards the north and Garal-Bhattapara towards the west.

The Air Force Colony is situated in Mountain Shadow. The Air Force Colony provides residence to families of defence personnel. Accoland, an amusement park is located in the nearby Patgaon village.

== Amenities ==
Azara houses the Azara railway station, which is accessible by the city-wide bus system. The Azara godhuli bazar is famous for its antique system of buying/selling (prices are determined by the volume) of local fishes.

A Decathlon big-box store is located near the Azara railway station. The Grocer Supermarket and Urmi Super Mart are the major grocery departmental stores in the area.

Hari Gayatri Das College is also in Azara area.

== See also ==
- Noonmati
- Panjabari
