= Azra Bihorac =

Bosnian-American nephrologist and medical AI researcher (born 1965)

- Born: April 1, 1965 (age 61); Brčko, Yugoslavia
- Citizenship: Bosnian-American

Academic background
- Education: University of Florida, MS; University of Sarajevo, MD

Academic work
- Discipline: Internal Medicine
- Sub-discipline: Nephrology
- Institutions: UF Health Shands Hospital; University of Florida College of Medicine; UF Intelligent Clinical Care Center (IC3)
- Website: ic3.center.ufl.edu

Azra Bihorac, MD, MS (born April 2, 1965) is a Bosnian-American professor, nephrologist, and critical care intensivist who is the senior associate dean of research at the University of Florida College of Medicine and the R. Glenn Davis Professor of Medicine, Surgery, Anesthesiology, and Physiology & Functional Genomics. She co-founded the Intelligent Clinical Care Center (IC3) research center at the University of Florida in 2021 with Parisa Rashidi.

== Early life and education ==
Bihorac grew up near Brčko and earned her medical degree from the University of Sarajevo in 1990 (a year before the Yugoslav Wars began) and started working at a hospital in Brčko. On April 29, 1992, weeks after the start of the Bosnian War, Bihorac fled the Bosnian genocide by escaping across the Sava river with her son, her medical degree, and 2,000 deutschmarks "sown in the underlining of [her] trench coat." At 5 a.m. the following morning, the Brčko bridge massacre occurred and killed 100 civilians crossing the bridge.

== Residencies and fellowships in Turkey and the United States ==
At Marmara University in Istanbul, Turkey, Bihorac was an internal medicine resident and a nephrology fellow.

In 2000, Bihorac came to the United States as a research fellow of the International Society of Nephrology and began a nephrology training fellowship at the University of Florida College of Medicine. After completing her fellowship at the University of Florida, she remained in the United States. "I got political asylum because I couldn't go back to Turkey, couldn't go back to Bosnia," Bihorac said, "so in order to practice medicine, I had to repeat all of my training."

At the University of Florida, Bihorac began a residency in internal medicine in 2003 and a fellowship in critical care medicine in 2006. She completed a Master of Science for Health Sciences in Clinical Research in 2011.

== Research and writing ==
Since 2010, Bihorac's labs have received continuous funding from the National Institutes of Health (NIH). Her research focuses on using artificial intelligence, machine learning, and deep learning to augment patient diagnostics and monitoring in intensive care medicine. Some of her most well-known work involves identifying biomarkers for acute kidney injury (AKI), treatment of AKI, and AI and machine learning techniques for predicting health outcomes for critically ill patients. As of May 2023, Bihorac's most cited publication is a 2013 study on AKI biomarkers, which has 812 citations.

Under Bihorac's direction, the (IC^{3}) at the University of Florida has gained attention for developments involving the use of AI to

- monitor and sense patient pain levels through cameras and sensors,
- predict postoperative complications for surgical patients, and
- continuously monitor ICU patients and provide a more accurate assessment of "illness severity at any point during an ICU stay."

Bihorac has edited or contributed chapters to the following textbooks:

- Encyclopedia of Sensors and Biosensors, 2023, Elsevier, chapter "Sensors in Hospitals"
- Evidence-Based Critical Care, 2020, Springer, chapter "Renal Disease: Rhabdomyolysis"
- Critical Care Nephrology, 3rd edition, 2017, Elsevier, chapter "AKI after Major Surgery"
- Current Concepts in Adult Critical Care, 3rd edition, 2014, editor and chapter "Complications after Surgery: The Perspective of the Injured Kidney"
- Textbook of Neurointensive Care, 2013, Springer, chapters "Acute Kidney Injury and Renal Replacement Therapy in the Neurologically Injured Patient" and "Water and Electrolyte Management in Neurological Disease"

Bihorac's work at the University of Florida has yielded more than 200 peer-reviewed scientific articles—including Scientific Reports, Nature Reviews Nephrology, Critical Care, PLOS ONE, IEEE Journal of Biomedical and Health Informatics, Annals of Surgery, and JAMA Surgery—and over 10,000 citations in other articles.

== Professional organizations ==
Bihorac is a Fellow of the American College of Critical Care Medicine (FCCM), a designation given to "practitioners, researchers, administrators, and educators who have made outstanding contributions to the collaborative field of critical care." She is also a Fellow of the American Society of Nephrology (FASN), a designation given to members of the American Society of Nephrology "who have distinguished themselves through excellence in practice or research."

== Awards and honors ==
- American Society of Nephrology Fellow (2007)
- Teaching Award, University of Florida (2008)
- Faculty Research Award, University of Florida College of Medicine (2010)
- American College of Critical Care Medicine Fellow (2012)
- Society of Critical Care Medicine, Vision Grant Award and President Citation (2013)
- Society of Critical Care Medicine, President Citation Award for Outstanding Contribution to SCCM (2018, 2019)
- Alpha Omega Alpha Honor Medical Society (2022)

== Personal life ==
Bihorac is married to surgeon Charles Hobson and lives in Gainesville, Florida, with their children.

== Innovations ==
- Biomarkers of acute kidney injury (AKI)
- Intensive Intelligent Care Unit (I2CU)
- MySurgeryRisk
- DeepSOFA
