= Azara (name) =

Azara is a surname. It is widely used in the north of Sardinia. In a linguistic study dated 2006 it was found to be the tenth most common surname in the island. Notable people with the surname are as follows:

- Antonio Azara (1883–1967), Italian jurist and politician
- Antonio María Cascajares y Azara (1834–1901), Spanish Roman Catholic cardinal
- Bachir Sid Azara (born 1996), Algerian wrestler
- Eusebio Bardají y Azara (1776–1842), Spanish politician and diplomat
- Félix de Azara (1746–1821), a naturalist, brother of José
- José Nicolás de Azara (1730–1804), a Spanish diplomat
- Nancy Azara (born 1939), an American sculptor

== Others ==
- Jo-El Azara, the pen name of Joseph Loeckx (born 1937), a Belgian comic writer and artist
- Azara Nasir, fictional character in 24 TV series
