= Azra Kanović =

Bosnia and Herzegovina volleyball player

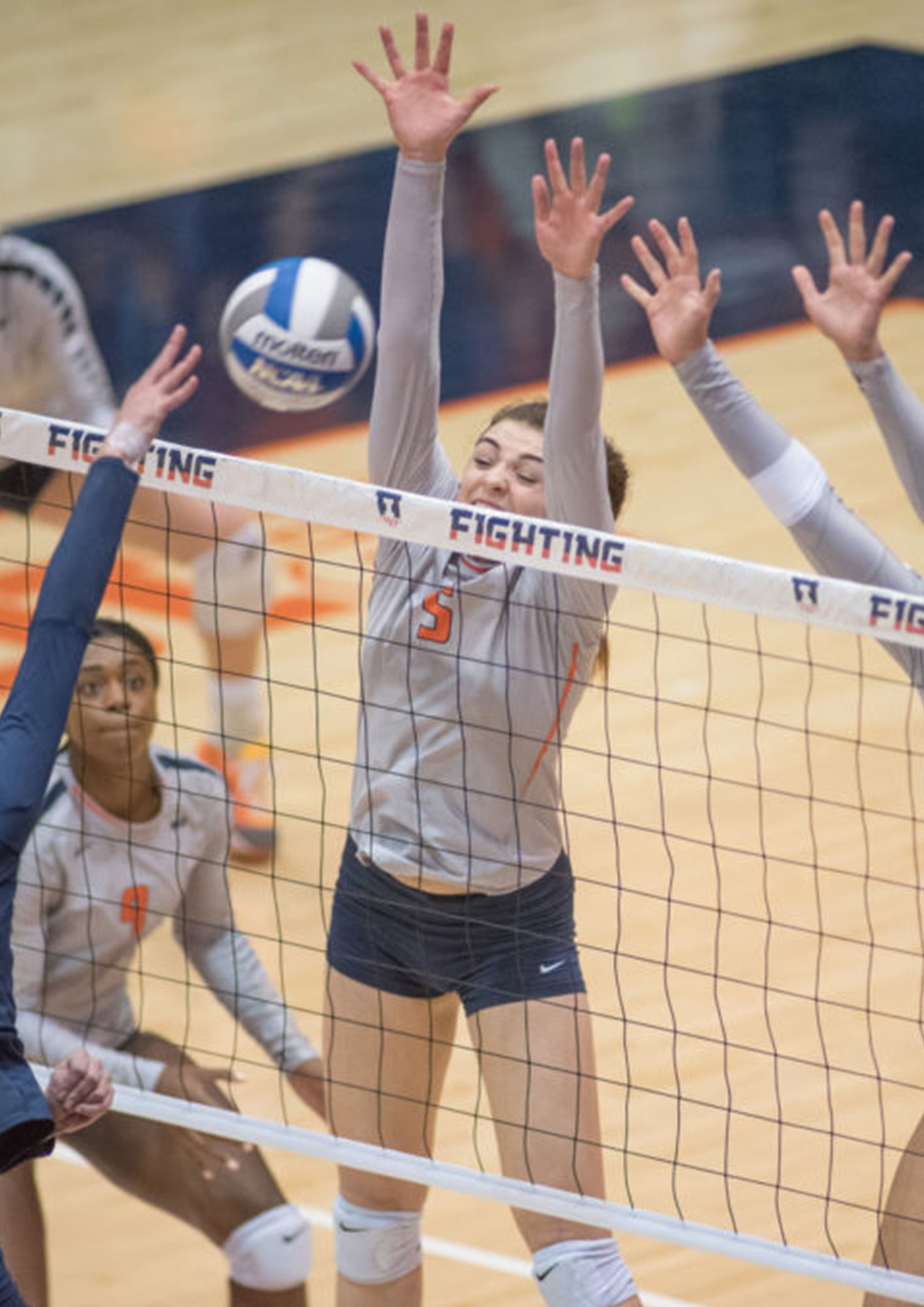

Personal information
- Full name: Azra Edina Kanović
- Nickname: Zoey
- Born: September 9, 1993 (age 33); Bosnia and Herzegovina
- Height: 1.84 m (6 ft 0 in)
- Weight: 64 kg (141 lb)

Volleyball information
- Position: Middle Blocker
- Current club: OK Bosna
- Number: 4

Azra Kanović (Azra Edina Kanović; born September 9, 1993) is a female volleyball player from Bosnia and Herzegovina, playing as a middle-blocker.

Playing for Bosnia's most successful volleyball club OK Bosna, she was a member of the Premier League of Volleyball of Bosnia and Herzegovina national championship winning team 2 times (2013, 2014) and the National Cup of Bosnia and Herzegovina winning team on 3 occasions (2012, 2013, 2014).
