= German Beauty Homer =

Breed of pigeon

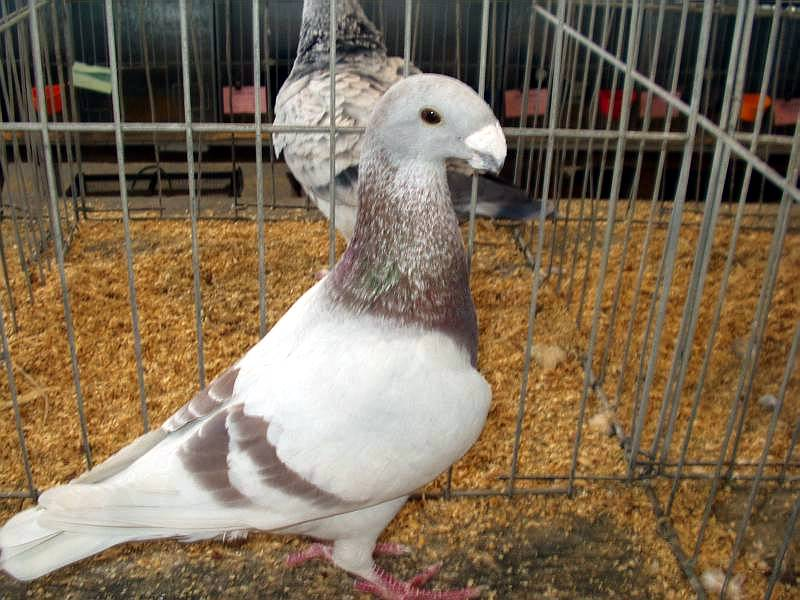
- German Beauty Homer
- Conservation status: Common
- Country of origin: Germany

Classification
- Australian Breed Group: Homers & Hens Group 4
- US Breed Group: Form
- EE Breed Group: Utility Pigeons (Form)

The German Beauty Homer is a breed of fancy pigeon developed over many years of selective breeding, from German racing pigeons. German Beauty Homers along with other varieties of domesticated pigeons are all descendants of the rock dove (Columba livia). The breed was first developed around one hundred years ago.

== Gallery ==
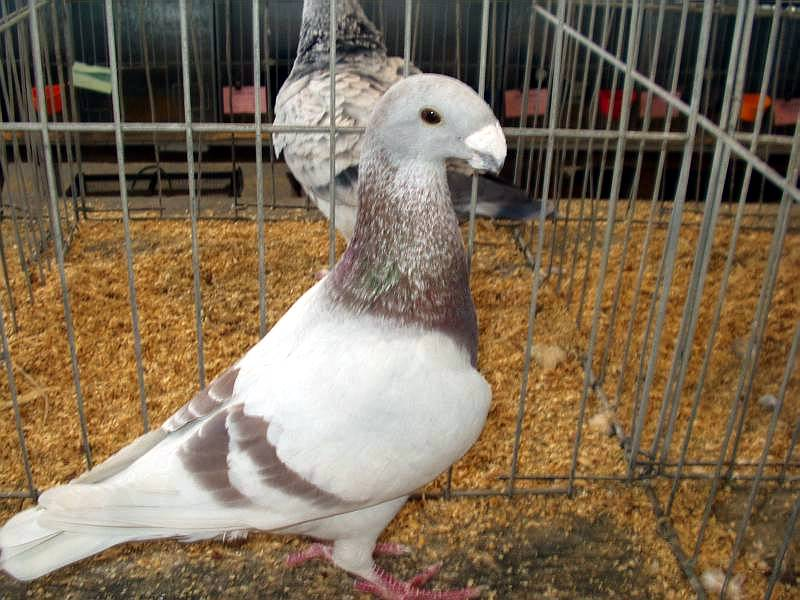
Red bar

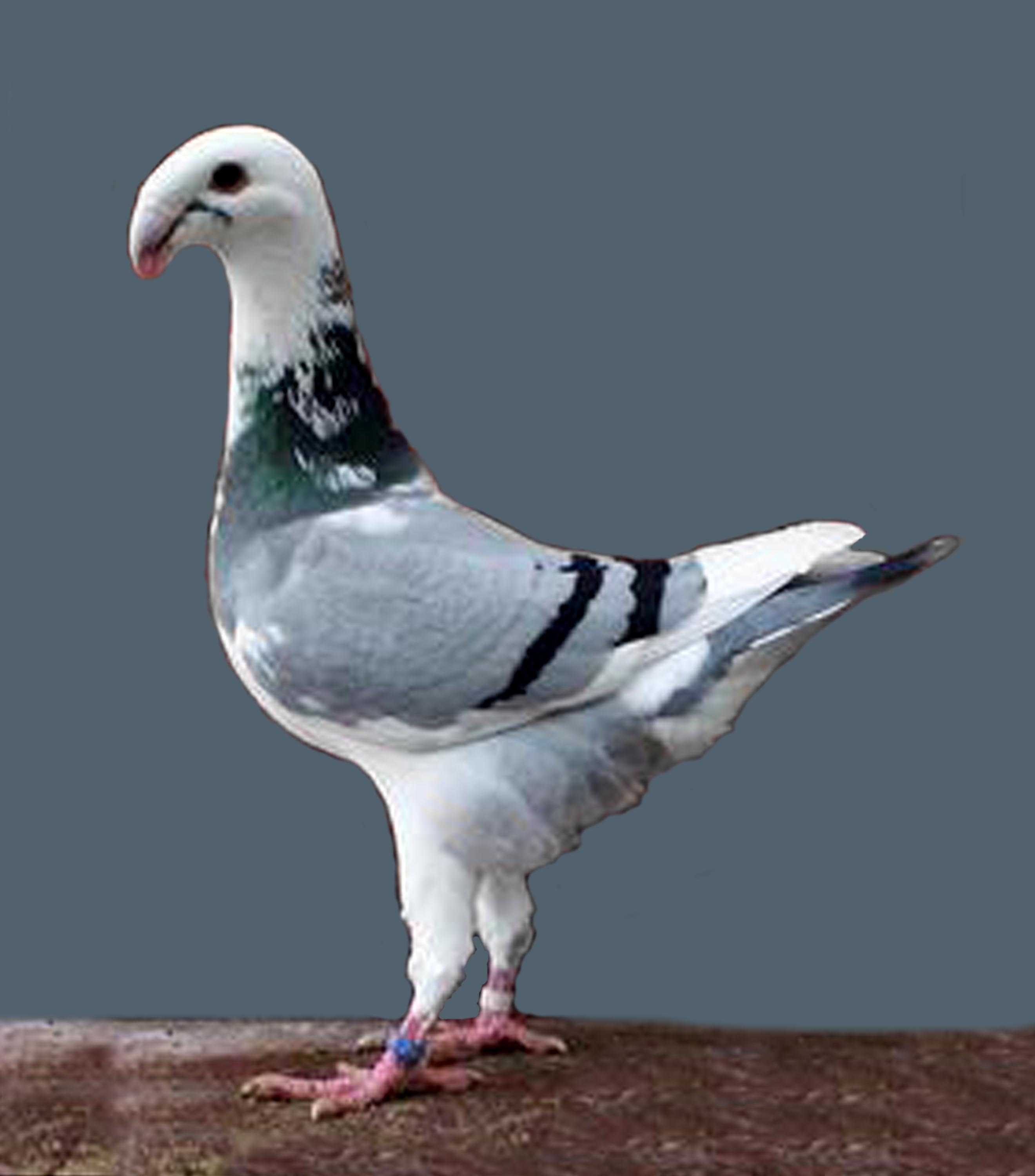
Blue bar pied

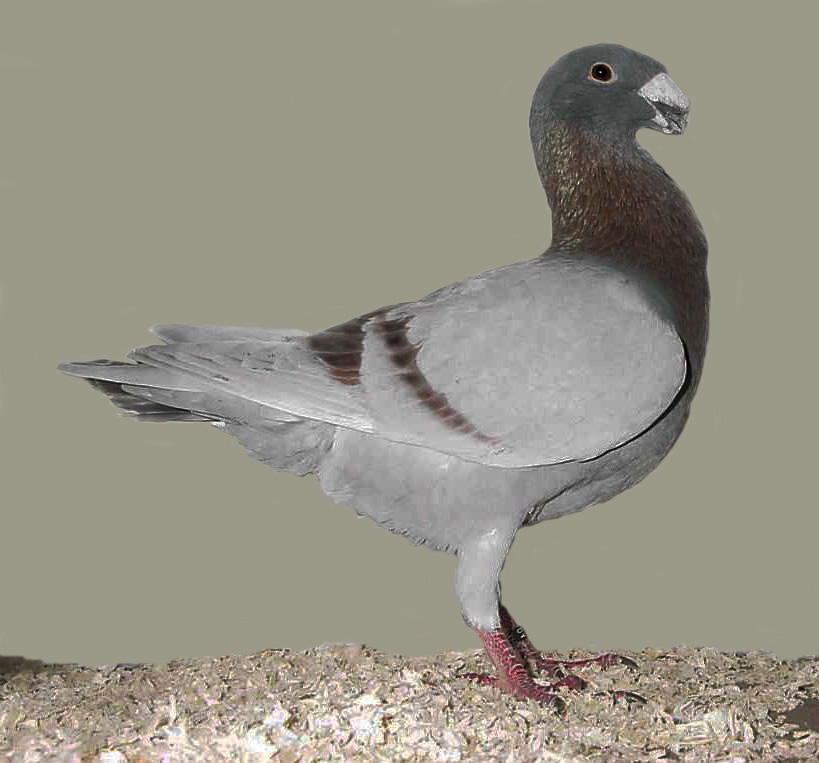
Mealie

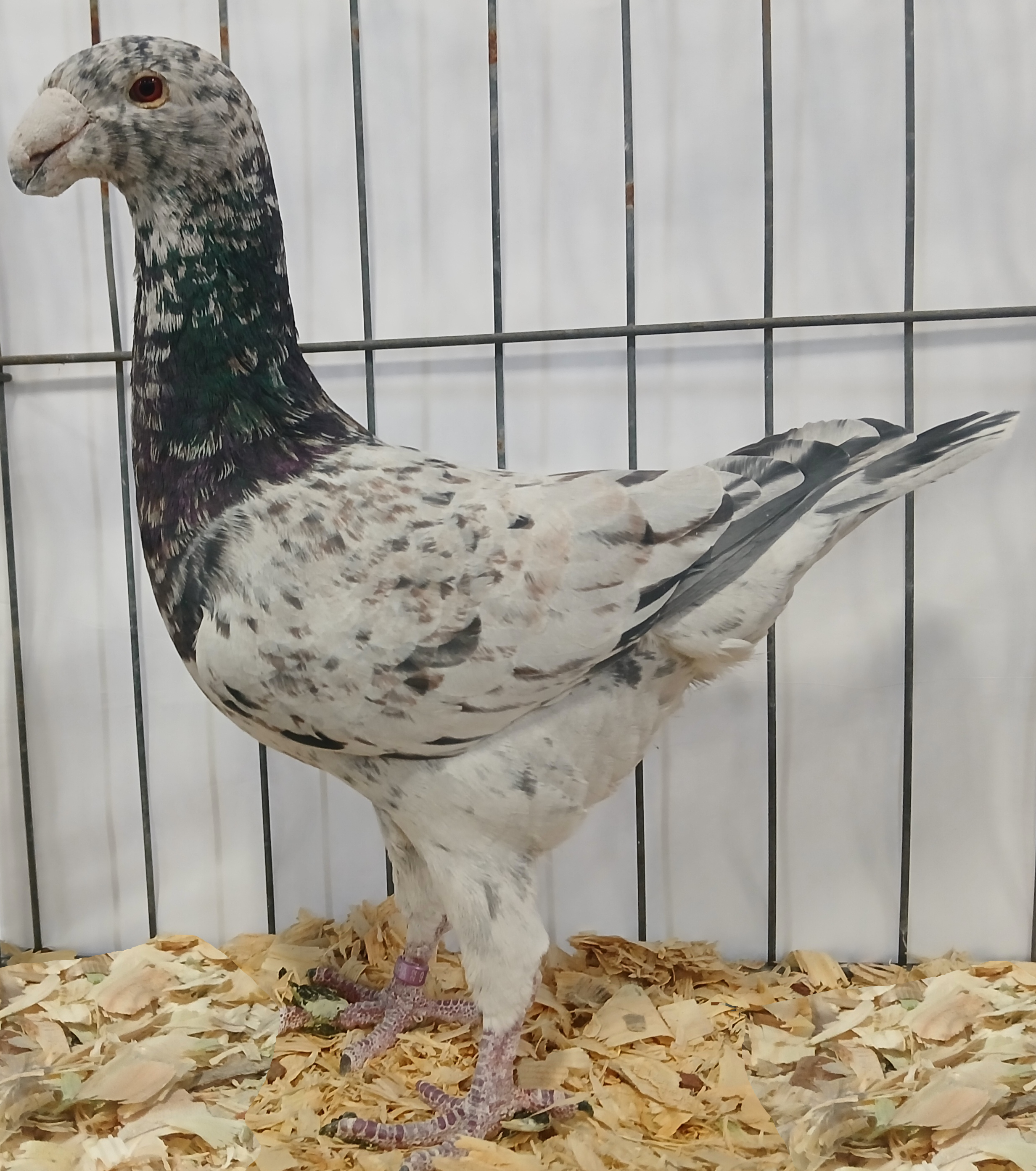
Almond

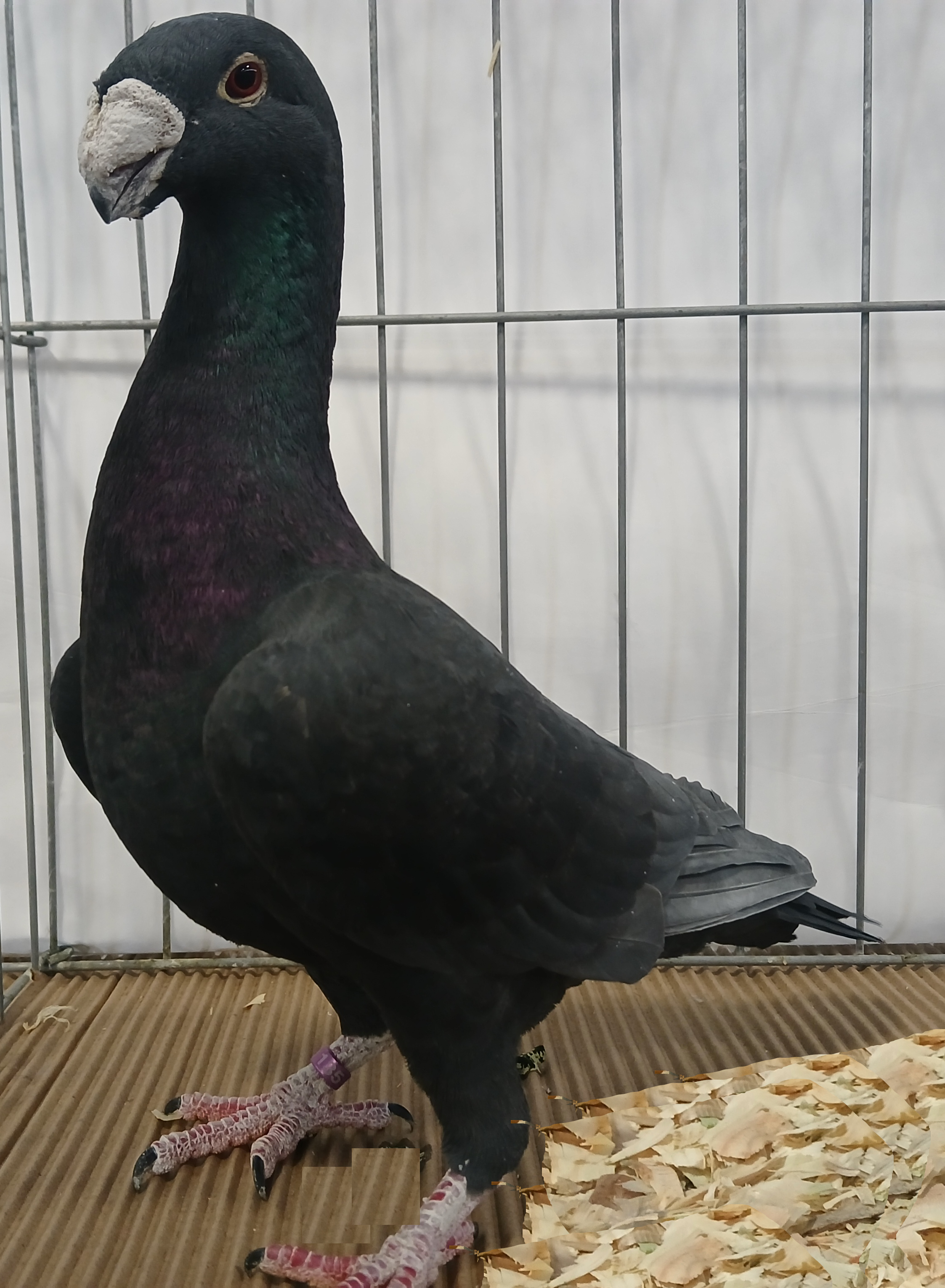
Black

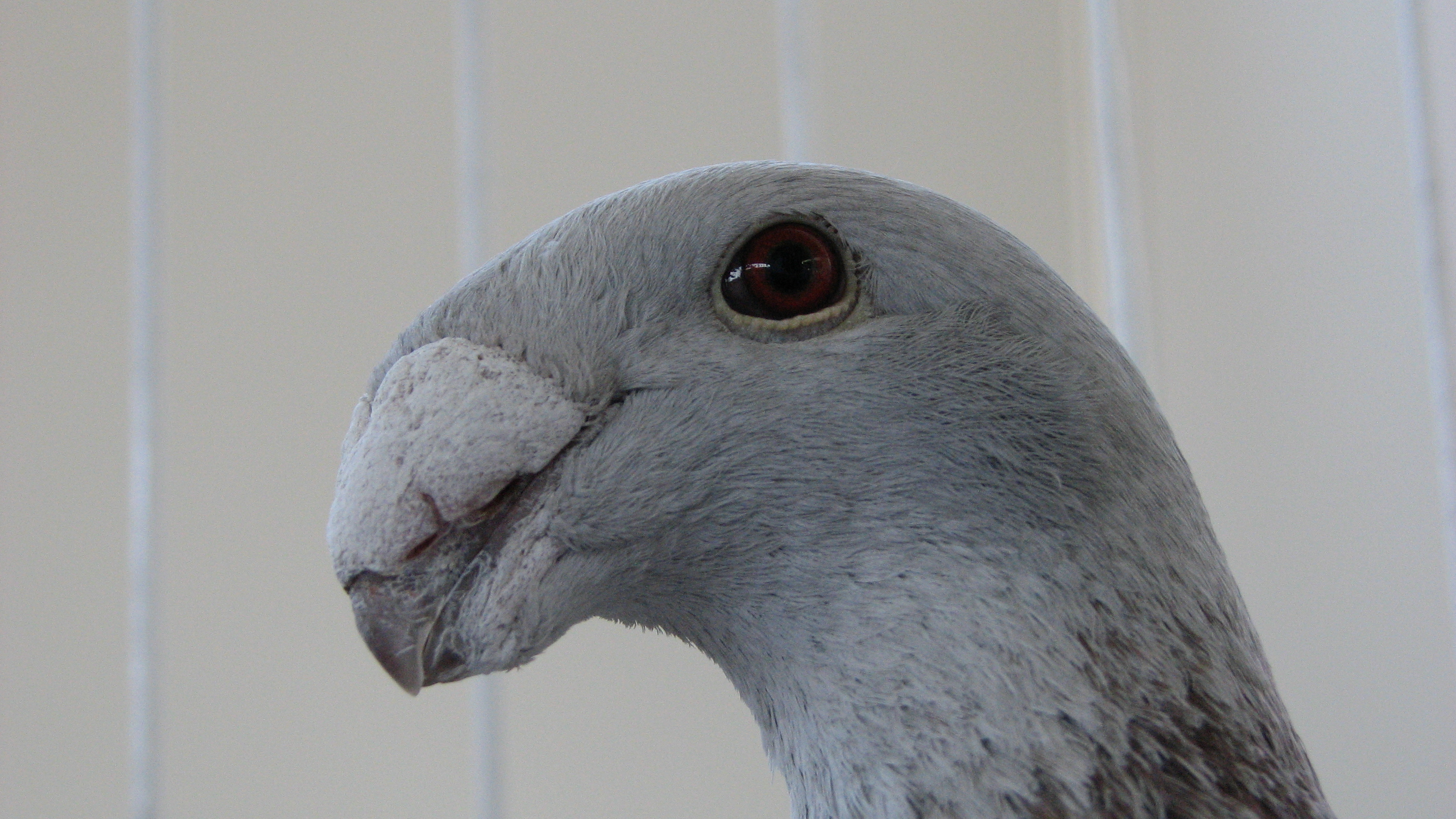
Head view

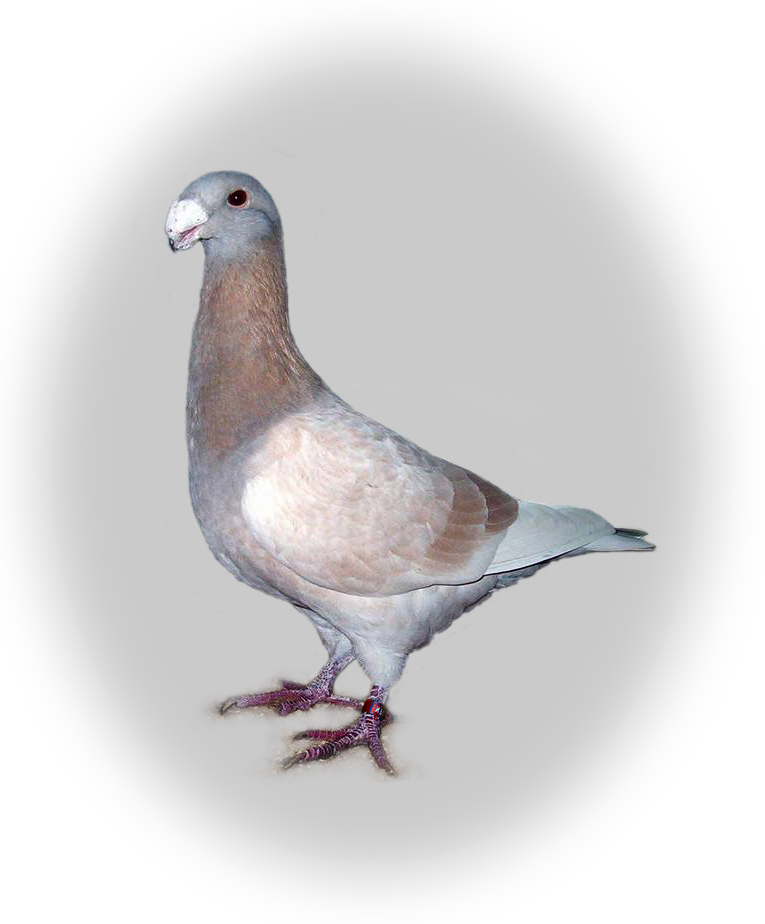
Cream bar

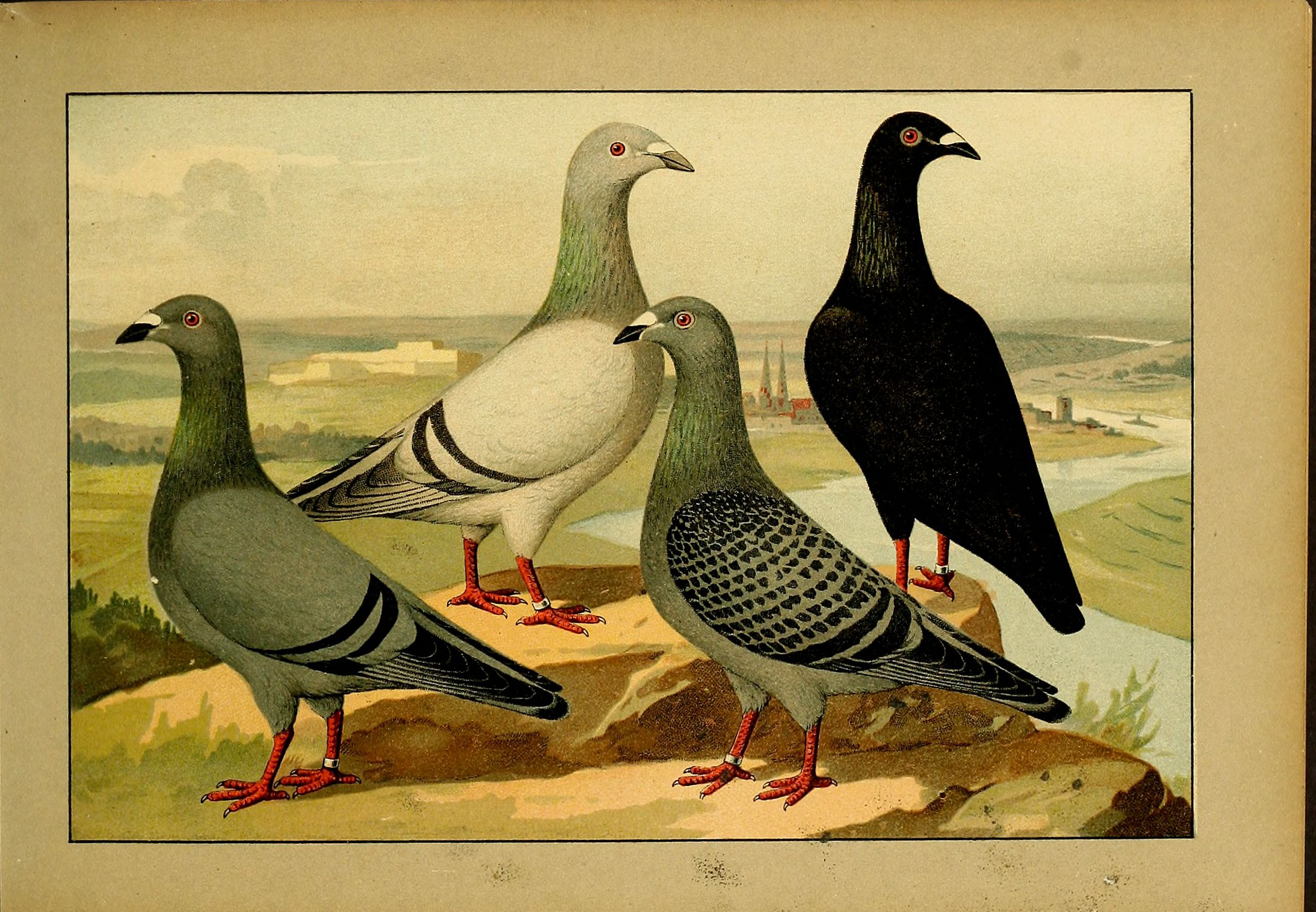
Schachtzabel 1906 Tafel 17

== See also ==
- Pigeon Diet
- Pigeon Housing
- List of pigeon breeds
