= Circulus (zoology) =

Reptilian social group

A circulus is a rarely occurring reptilian social group where there is interaction and personal exchange between individuals. Members will often protect and defend young, even if not of direct genetic linkage. Circulus is a Latin-based term; one definition of the word is "a social gathering or circle company". Most reptiles are indifferent socially to each other as adults or to offspring.

== Behaviours ==
Among crocodilians and certain lizards, there is a much greater interaction between members compared to other reptiles. Young will be guarded and defended for a considerable period of time. Crocodilians of both sexes may carry and assist young hatchlings to the water and guard them. The gharial (Gavialis gangeticus) has to nudge young to the water because their teeth are too sharp to carry them. Sub-adult members of a crocodilian social group will often stand by a female laying eggs or retrieving young from a nest to keep predators away. The female Asian forest tortoise (Manouria emys) has been reported to guard a nest site for a short period after egg laying but this instinct is very short lived.

The social bond and parental attention of reptiles appears equal in circulus containing egg-laying reptiles compared to those with live bearing reptiles. In stump-tailed skinks (Tiliqua rugosa) and Solomon Islands skinks (Corucia zebrata), long term bonding of pairs with each other and other members has been recorded. In the case of Corucia, orphaned young have been observed being adopted into the circulus. Another case of egg-laying lizards with a circulus is the red-eyed crocodile skink (Tribolonotus gracilis). The female will sit on the egg and guard the young. As in the case of Corucia, the young tend to stay close to the parents, especially the mother who guards the neonates. The young skink will often climb on the abaxial area of the female or male for protection and security, just as in the case of the Solomon Islands skink.

== See also ==
- Sociality
- Aggregation (ethology)
