= American Show Racer =

Breed of pigeon

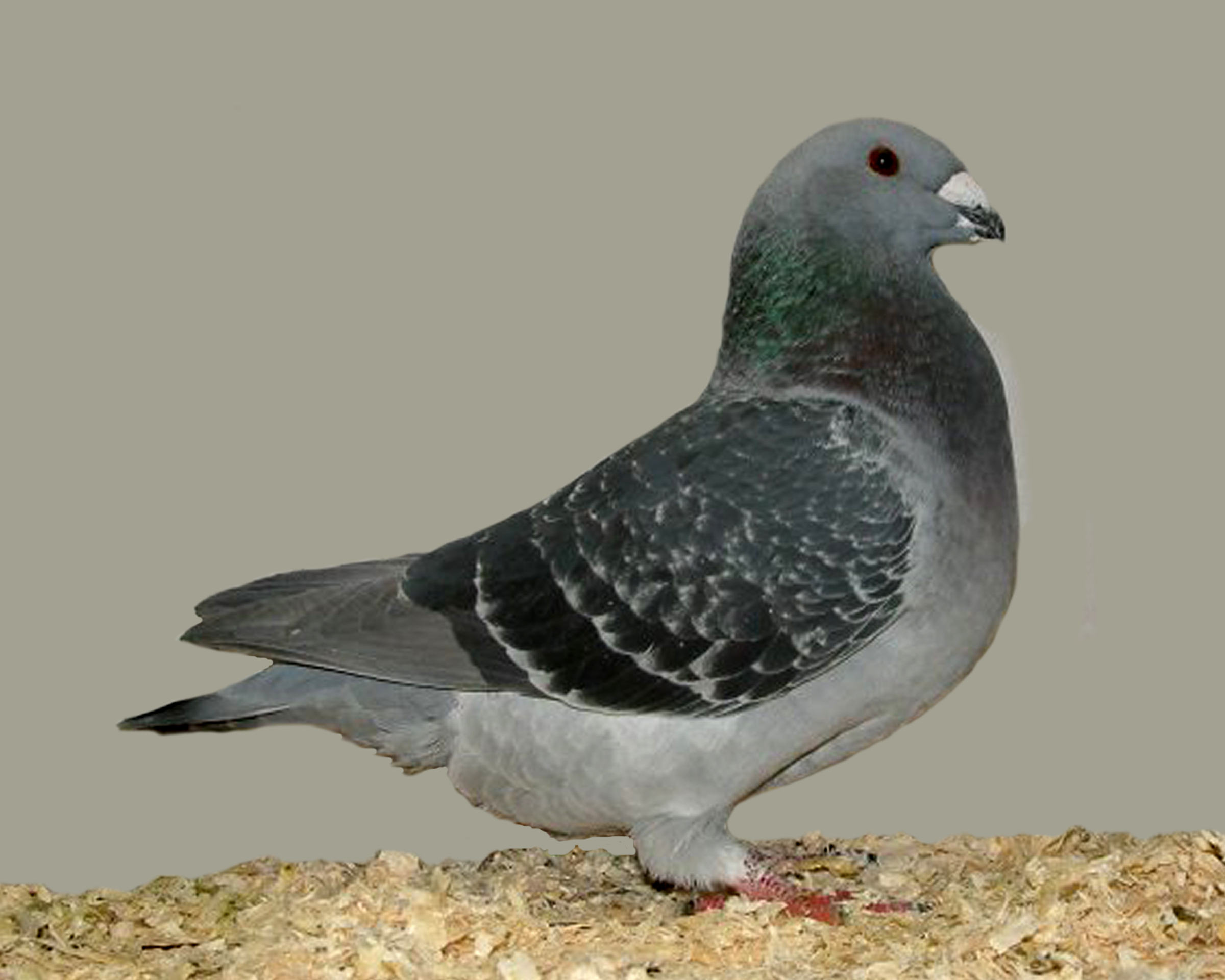
- American Show Racer
- Conservation status: Common
- Other names: Show Pen Racer
- Nicknames: Bird of Dignity
- Country of origin: United States

Traits
- Crest type: none
- Feather ornamentation: none

Classification
- Australian Breed Group: Group 4 Homers and Hens
- US Breed Group: Form
- EE Breed Group: Formentauben

Notes
- This breeds development included several names from Show Pen Racer, Show Racing Homers, and the now accepted Show Racer

The American Show Racer (also known as the Show Pen Racer, and nicknamed the "Bird of Dignity") is a breed of fancy pigeon. It began being crafted over 100 years ago in the United States with selective breeding. It is primarily considered a show breed of form rather than racing. The Show racer along with other varieties of domesticated pigeons are all direct descendants of the rock dove (Columba livia). Pigeon historian Wendell Levi mentions Show Pen Racers in his book The Pigeon. He describes the early development of the breed in the United States and early breeders of the variety.

== History ==
From the very beginning, the ordinary flying Homer was crossed with an Antwerp to get the substance, a Scandaroon to get the length of head and curve of the top of' the skull, and with the Cumulet to get the delicate cere The American Pigeon Journal displayed the Show Homer, bred by Neuerburg on its cover in May 1927. Showing began during the late 1920s and 1930s, on the east coast but it was not until the early 40s that a standard was drawn to guide the breed's development. Breeders on the west coast, including Twombly, also began developing the breed and by the early 1950s they were being shown at the famous Pageant of Pigeons show. The breeds further development had firmly become national in scope. By the 60's with the aid of established standard the breed, breeders in the Northwest began outcrossing with other breeds to incorporate new colors without changing form. Earl Dean of Wichita, however, is credited with establishing the rare colors now found in the breed.In 1952, The American Show Pen Racer Club was formed at the National Show held in Des Moines, Iowa. As years passed, the word “pen” was removed from the club name and it was officially changed to The American Show Racer Association (ASRA). As the breed developed, the standard was updated and in the year 2000, a new standard drawing was created and accepted by vote of the membership. Emphasis is placed on "station" (which includes an upright posture) and a powerful head. The bird should be very smooth-feathered.

== Status ==
The ASRA currently has approximately 150 members in 37 US states and seven other countries. It is an affiliate club of the National Pigeon Association. The breed is popular at shows. In November 2007, at the Pageant of Pigeons held in San Bernardino, California, approximately 150 were entered by 15 exhibitors.

== Characteristics ==
The entire pigeon is wedge-shaped from head to toe, standing around nine inches tall, and weighing just over a pound. The cocks are slightly larger than the hens by an once or two. There is no feather ornamentation of any kind, the breed relying completely on form and condition. The head is smooth, broad, and stout, in an unbroken curved oval. It measures about 1.5 inches in length, without a prominent forehead or stop above the nose wattle. The wattle is heart shaped on a medium length and thickness of beak, smooth in texture and free from coarseness. The eyes are a dark red chestnut color, with small, smooth, neat, and finely laced, dark or plum colored cere. The tail is rather short, having the usual 12 tail feathers but lying so tightly on one another as to appear as a single feather. The legs are short to medium length, dark in color, and have no feathering below the hocks. The bird stands rather horizontally, keeping the tail well off the ground Bill Schlieper nicknamed the it "Bird of Dignity.")

=== Colors ===
Colors now run the full range from the original of blue/black and ash reds, to Dun, Silver, Splashes, Grizzles, Opal, Andalusian, Almond, Recessive Reds and Yellow, Yellow bar and check, Indigo bar and check, and White bar.

== Gallery ==
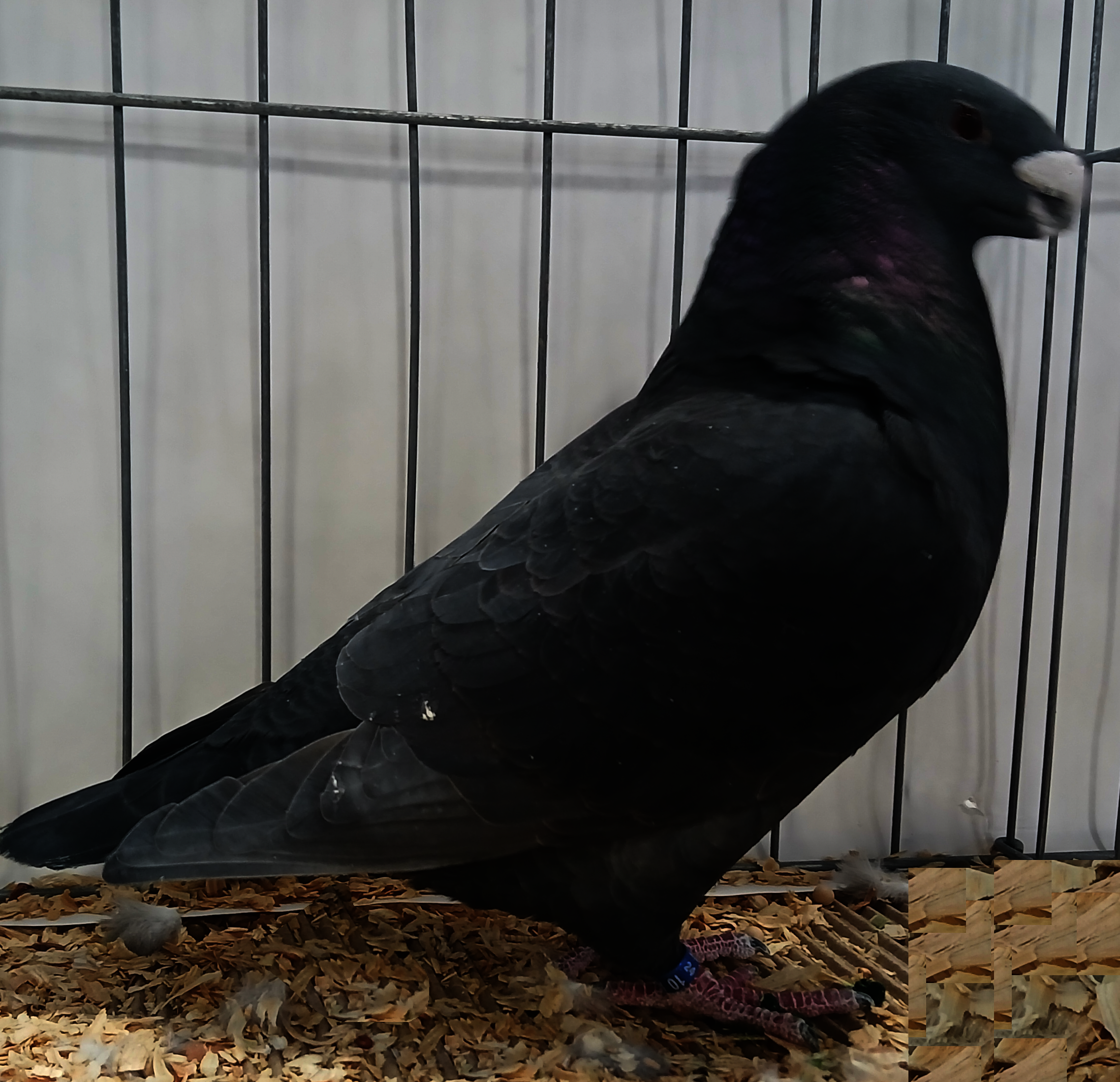
Black

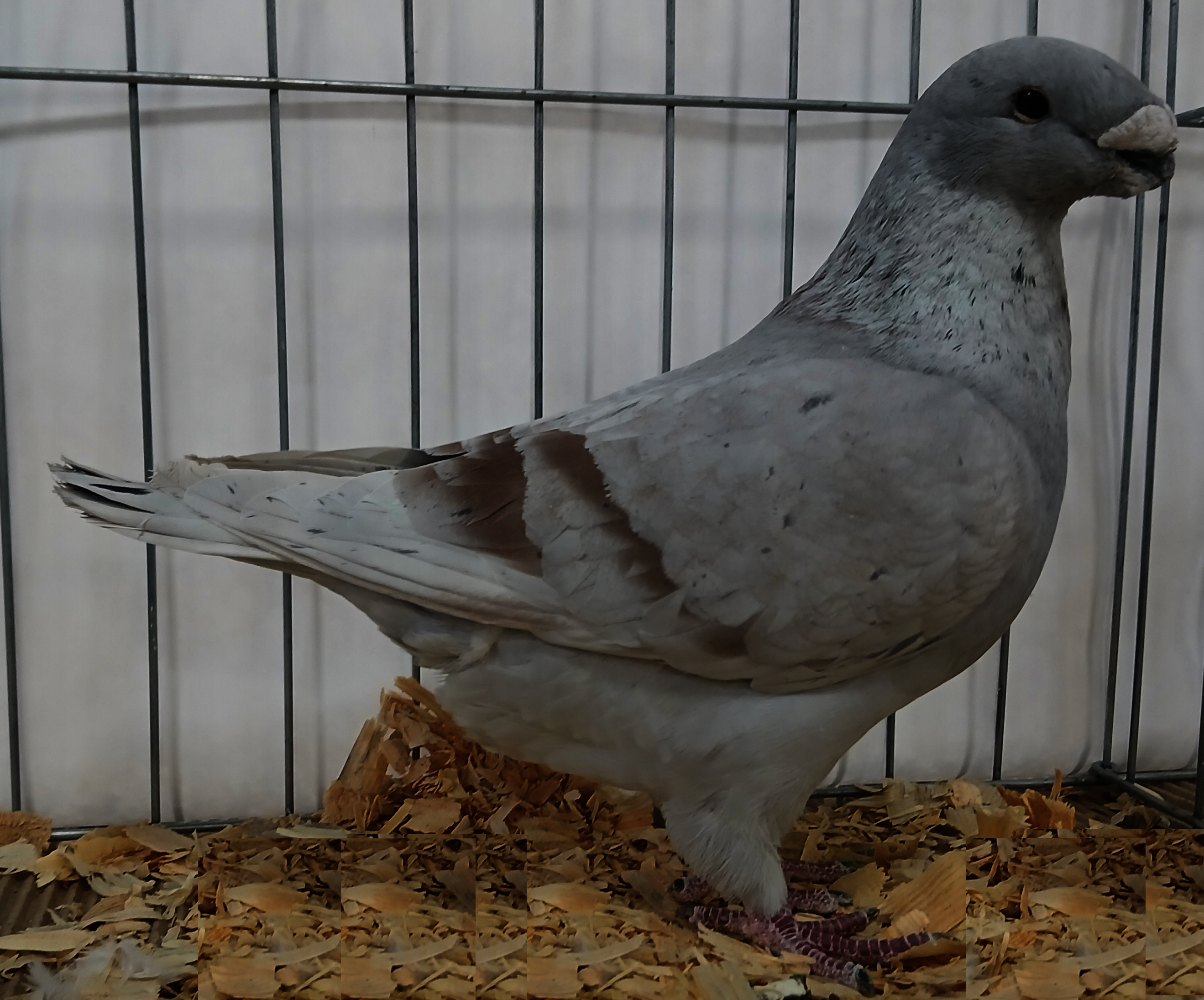
Flecked red bar

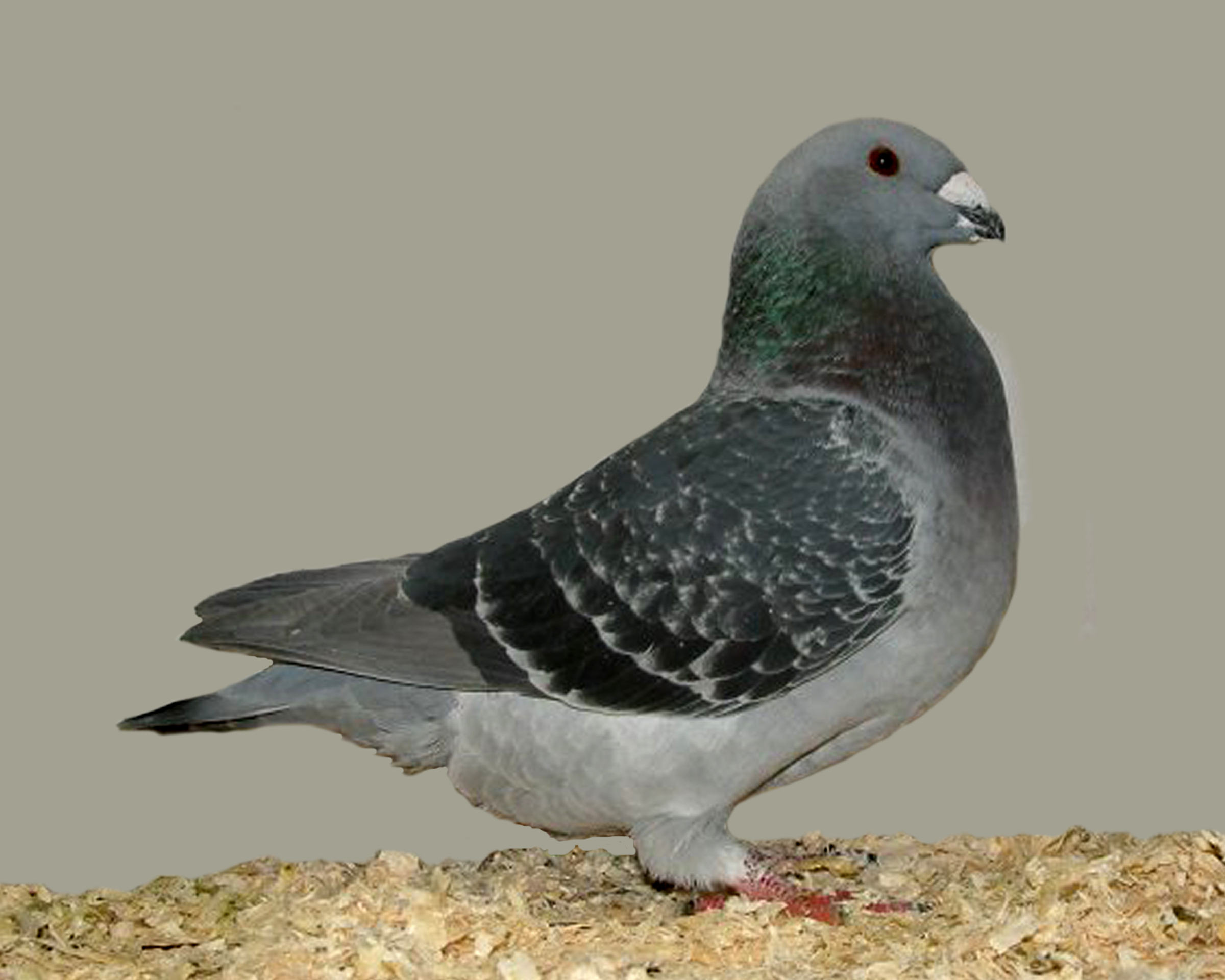
Blue Check

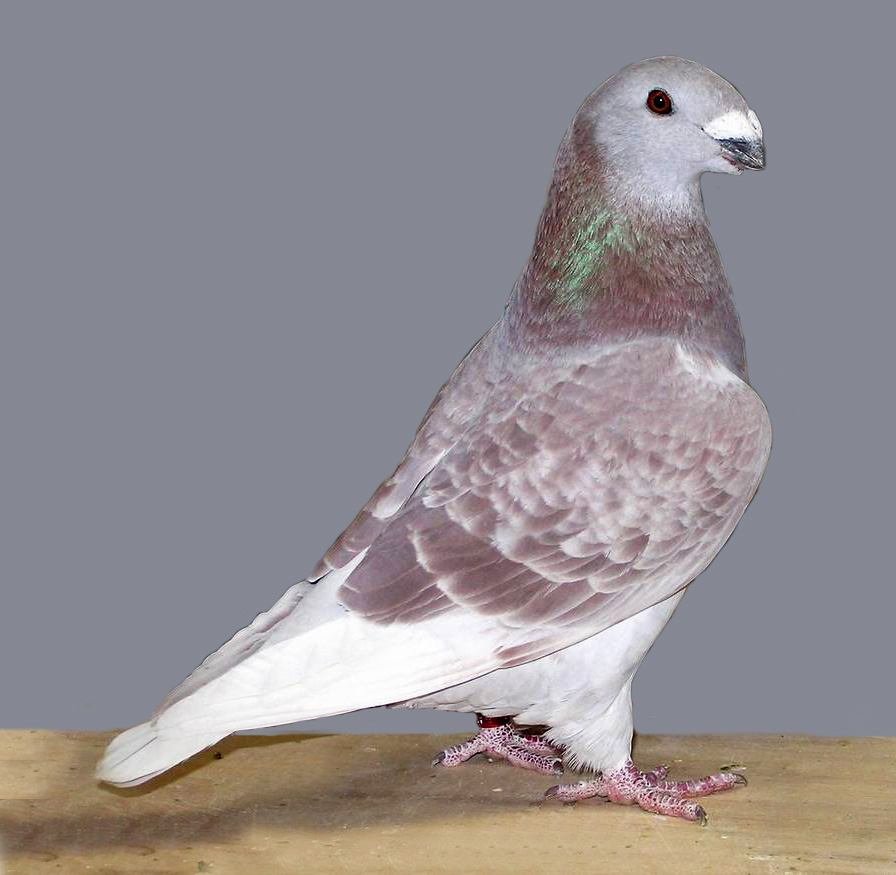
Red check

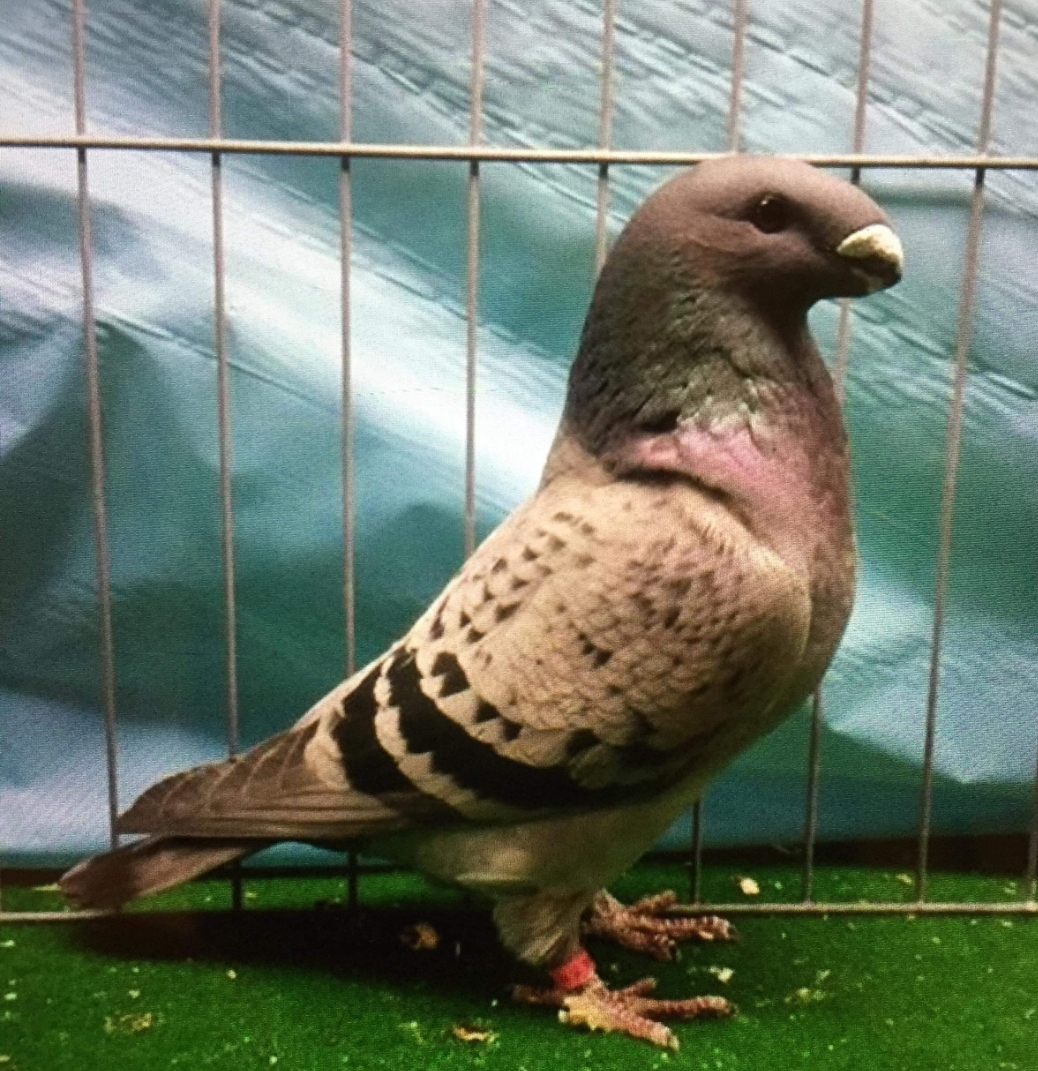
Blue Check

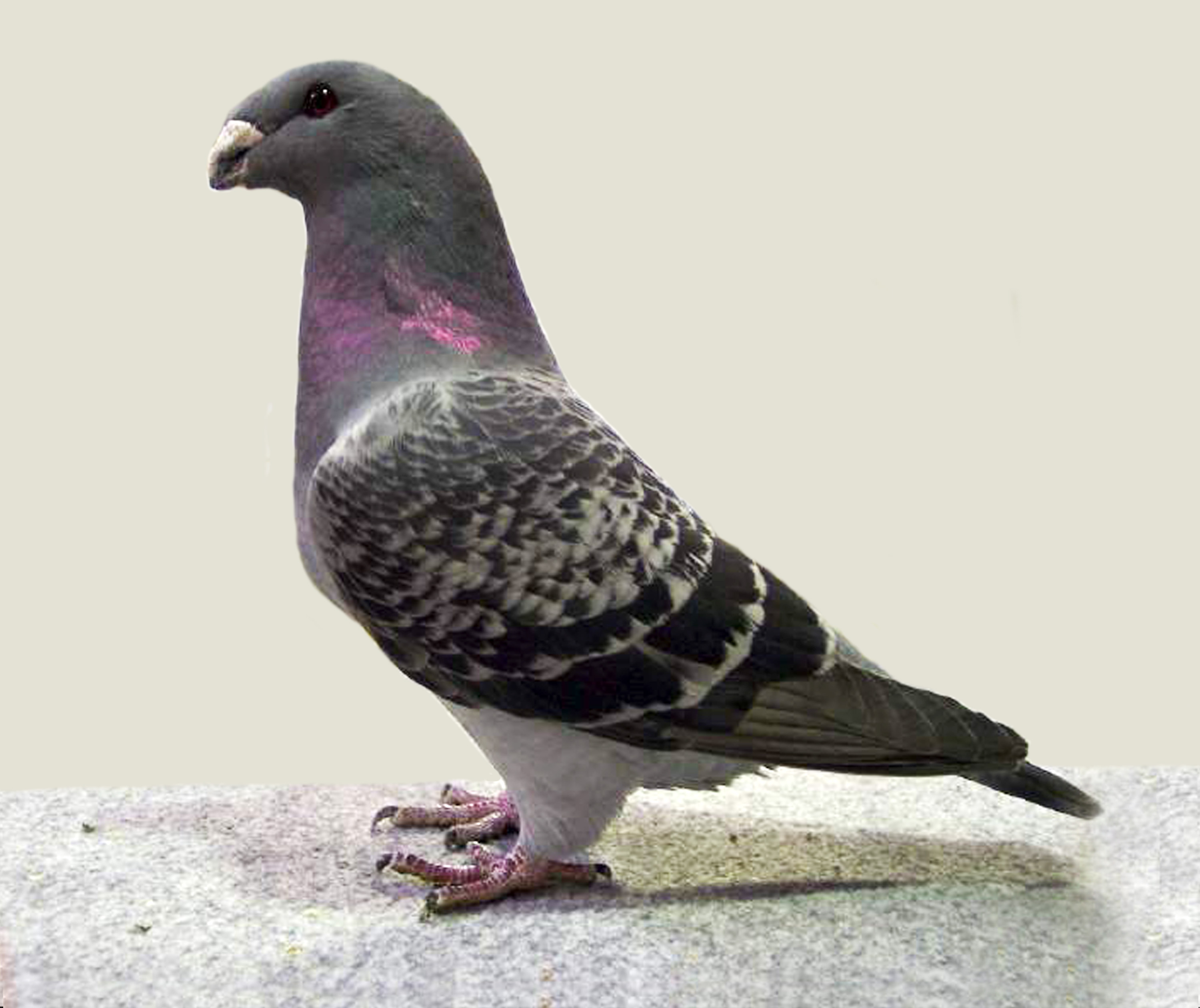
Blue Check

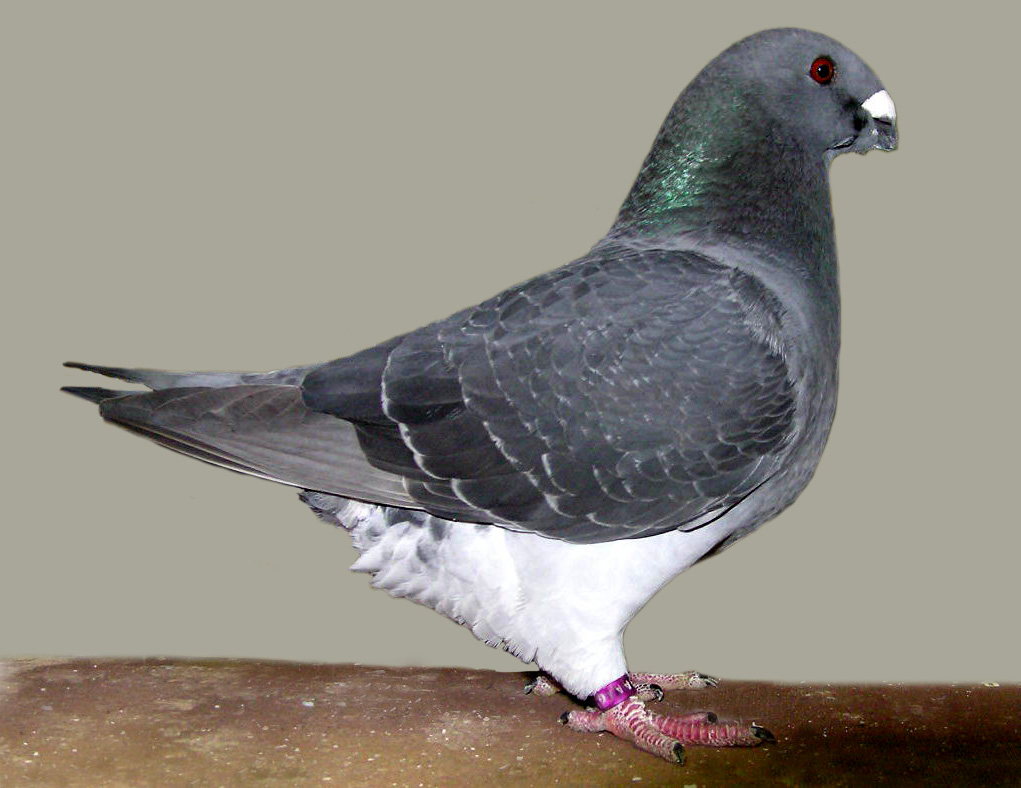
Dark Blue Check

== See also ==
- Pigeon racing
- Homing pigeon
- List of pigeon breeds
- Pigeon keeping
  - Pigeon Diet
  - Pigeon Housing
