= Azra Aksamija =

Bosnian artist

Azra Akšamija
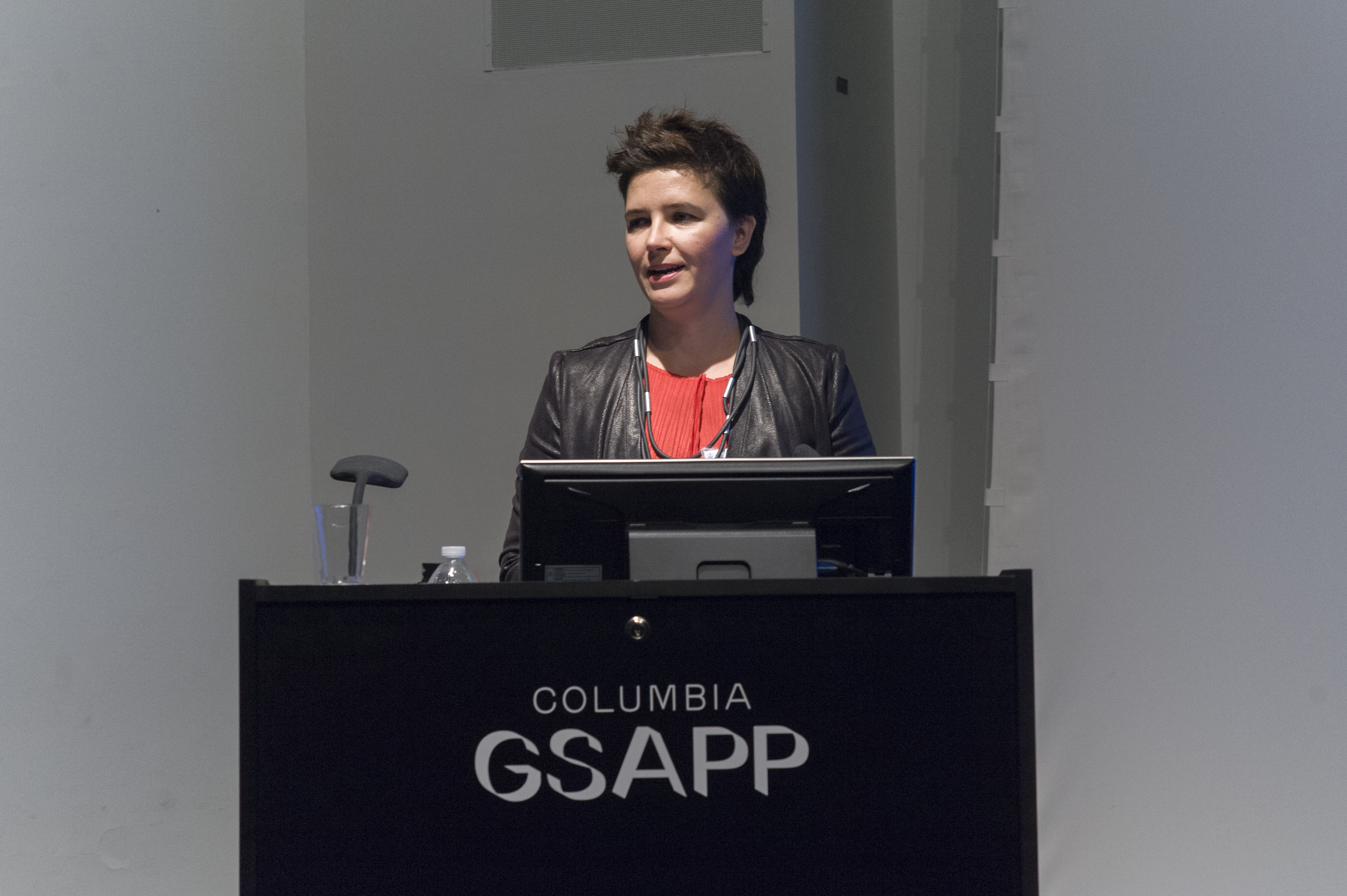
- Born: Sarajevo, Bosnia and Herzegovina
- Education: Princeton University, MIT
- Occupations: Associate Professor at the Arts, Culture and Technology program at MIT

Azra Akšamija is a Bosnian-Austrian artist and architectural historian. Her work focuses on the role of cultural and religious identity in conflicts, especially in the recent history of the Bosnian War and its aftermath. Akšamija is currently a professor at the Art, Culture and Technology program at the Massachusetts Institute of Technology (MIT).

== Artwork ==
=== Wearable Mosques ===
A series of Akšamija's projects translate the codes of religious architecture into clothing and contextualize them into a specific cultural setting. Aksamija argues that the concept of the mosque transcends architectural styles and typologies and can be even extended to clothing. Her "wearable mosques" fulfill all formal requirements of a mosque and are conceptualized by the artist as tools for inter-cultural communication.

The Nomadic Mosque project explores various ways of negotiating spatial relationships between Islamic traditions and modernity in the US and Western Europe. Through the design of wearable mosques, clothes that can be transformed into prayer-rugs, the project examines the notion of the mosque space and investigates its formal limits.

The Survival Mosque addresses issues of Muslims living in the contemporary USA. The survival kit contains elements for self-protection such as the American-flag façade that communicates patriotism, gas-masque, nose filters and an umbrella that surveys one’s back.

The Frontier Vest hybridizes different religious equipment and a contemporary vest design. This wearable prototype lends itself for different purposes, both sacred and secular. Pointing at the shared histories and belief systems of Judaism and Islam, the Frontier Vest can be transformed either into a tallit, a Jewish prayer shawl, or into an Islamic prayer rug. Originating in the nomadic life of Bedouins, and informed by the historic experience of exodus, the Frontier Vest also represents a minimal wear useful for a contemporary refugee.

Based on the concept of the Nomadic Mosque, the premise the Dirndlmoschee is based on the Dirndl, a traditional Austrian dress, is still worn in the everyday life in some places in Austria, such as in the little town of Strobl at the Wolfgang Lake. The Dirndlmoschee can be transformed into an Islamic prayer environment that provides a prayer space for three people.

=== Projects on the Balkan Context ===
Monument in Waiting is a collective testimony of the ‘ethnic cleansing’ in Bosnia-Herzegovina, carried out by nationalist extremists during the war of 1992-95, in form of a Kilim, a Bosnian prayer rug. The pattern of this hand-woven kilim tells the story of the systematic devastation of Islamic cultural heritage during the war and points at the impact of this erasure of memory on the Bosniaks’ religious, ethnic, and national identities today.

The project Arizona Road examines the informal urban phenomena of the Arizona Market in northern Bosnia-Herzegovina, the largest black market in the Balkans at the time. The market emerged along the federal highway called “Arizona Road” during the recent war in the region.

The Lost Highway Expedition is a tour to explore the unknown future of Europe. A massive joint movement of over 200 artists and individuals traveled through nine cities in the Western Balkan (Ljubljana, Zagreb, Novi Sad, Belgrade, Skopje, Priština, Tirana, Podgorica and Sarajevo) from July 30 to August 24 of 2006.

=== Other works ===
Akšamija created the Qibla Wall for the prayer room of the Islamic Cemetery in Altach, Austria, by architect Bernardo Bader (inaugurated in 2012; recipient of the Aga Khan Award for Architecture, 2013 cycle). Created with a stainless steel mesh and wood shingles which create a calligraphic pattern spelling out Allah and Muhammad.

== Publications ==
- Akšamija, Azra. “Generative Design Principles for the Contemporary Mosque.” In: The Mosque. Political, Architectural and Social Transformations, edited by Ergün Erkoçu and Cihan Bugdaci, 129 -139. Rotterdam: NAi Publishers, 2009. https://web.archive.org/web/20110925042951/http://www.naipublishers.nl/architecture/de_moskee_e.html
- Akšamija, Azra. “Echo of Islam in the West: Reactions to the Wearable Mosque.” ArteEast Online, edited by Diana Allan. (March 1, 2009). http://www.arteeast.org
- Akšamija, Azra. “A-national Heroes.” In: Lexicon of Provisional Futures, edited by Centrala – Foundation for Future Cities. http://www.provisionalfutures.net/?author=30
- Akšamija, Azra. “(Re)Constructing History: Post-Socialist Mosque Architecture in Bosnia and Herzegovina.” In: Divided God And Intercultural Dialog, edited by Tomislabv Žigmanov, 106 – 133. Ljubljana: Dijaški Dom Ivana Cankara (DIC) and KUD Pozitiv, 2008. https://web.archive.org/web/20100820032544/http://www.pozitiv.si/dividedgod/
- Akšamija, Azra. “The World as a Mosque” and “Kunstmoschee.” In: Exhibition catalogue published on the occasion of the exhibition Kunstmoschee by Azra Aksamija, edited by Secession Vienna, 7-29. Vienna: Secession Vienna, 2007.
- Akšamija, Azra and Khadija Z. Carroll. “Living Monument.” In: Memoshpere. Rethinking Monuments, edited by Mihnea Mircan and Meta Haven: Design Research. Published on the occasion of the exhibition “Low-Budget Monuments” in the Romanian pavilion at the 52nd Venice Biennial. Frankfurt: Revolver, 2007. http://plan-b.ro/index.php?/publications/memosphere/
- Akšamija, Azra and Deniz Turker. “Islamic Architecture.” In: Encyclopedia of Islam in the United States. Vol.1., edited by Jocelyne Cesari. Westport, CT: Greenwood Press, 2007.
- Akšamija, Azra. “The Generic Mosque. Design Principles for Mosque Design.” Elisava TdD. Critical Design 24, (2007): 51 – 61.
- Akšamija, Azra. “Urban Navigation.” In: Urban Ecology: Detroit and Beyond, edited by Kyong Park, 40-43. Hong Kong: Map Book Publishers, 2005.
- Akšamija, Azra. “The Bosnian Chronicle.“ In: On the Political Power of Cultural Territories, edited by Gallerie für Zeitgenössische Kunst Leipzig in cooperation with Kulturstiftung des Bundes, 364 – 391. Köln: Verlag der Buchhandlung Walter König, 2003/2004.
- Akšamija, Azra. “Arizona Road. The Discovery of the Urban Phenomenon: Arizona Road in Bosnia,” Arterlier. Contemporary Art Magazine 8, (2003): 139-145.
- Akšamija, Azra. “The Fallen Angel. The building of Oslobodjenje in the context of post-war reconstruction of Bosnia and Herzegovina,”Arterlier. Contemporary Art Magazine 8, (2003): 146-154.
- Akšamija, Azra. “Arizona Road.” In: Designs für die wirkliche Welt. Designs for the Real World, edited by Sabine Breitwieser, Generali Foundation, 36-79. Vienna/ Cologne: Verlag der Buchhandlung Walter König, 2002.
