= COVID-19 pandemic in Assam =

Ongoing COVID-19 viral pandemic in Assam, India

- Location of Assam in India

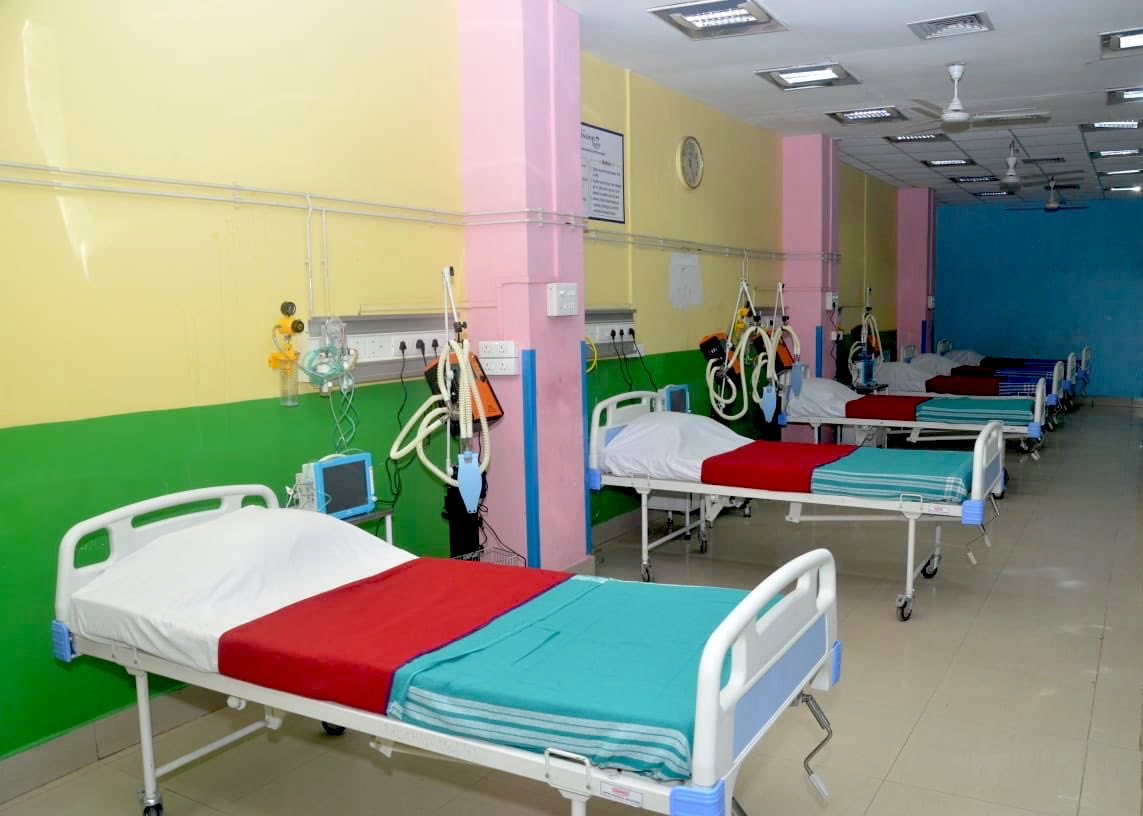
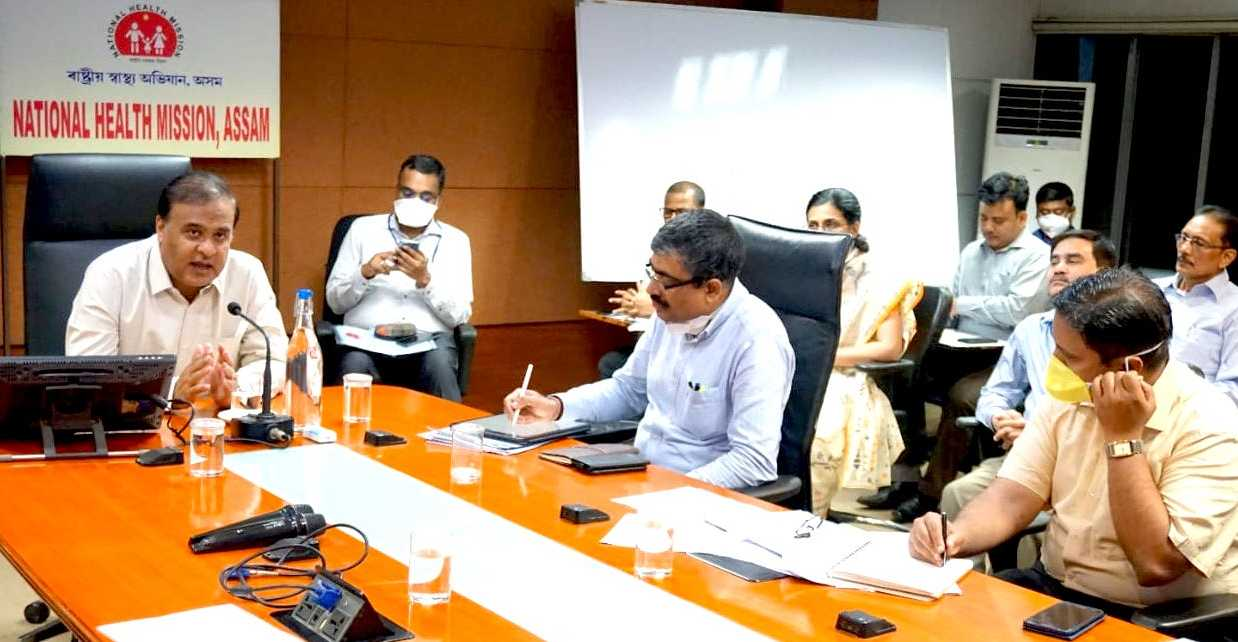
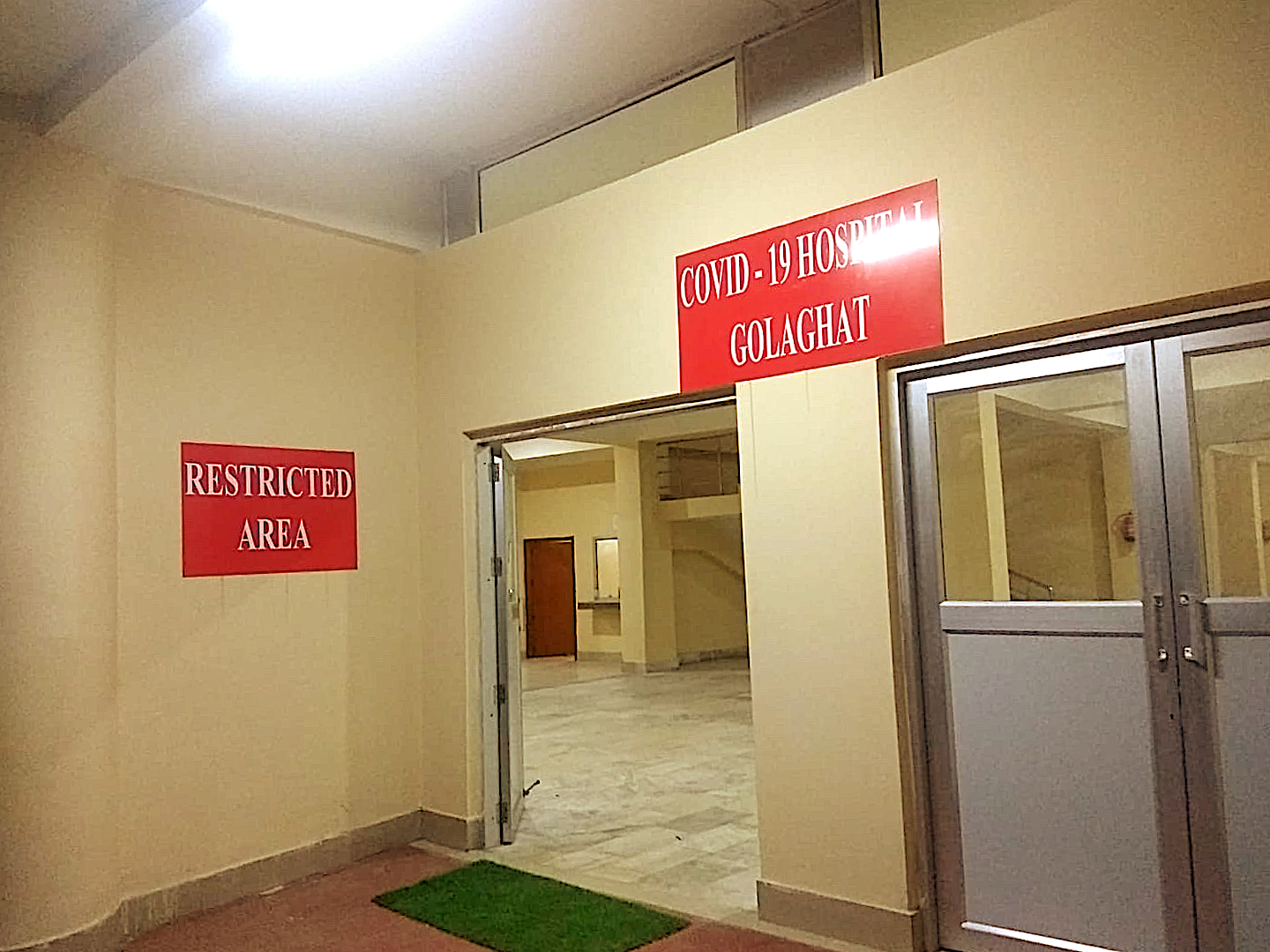
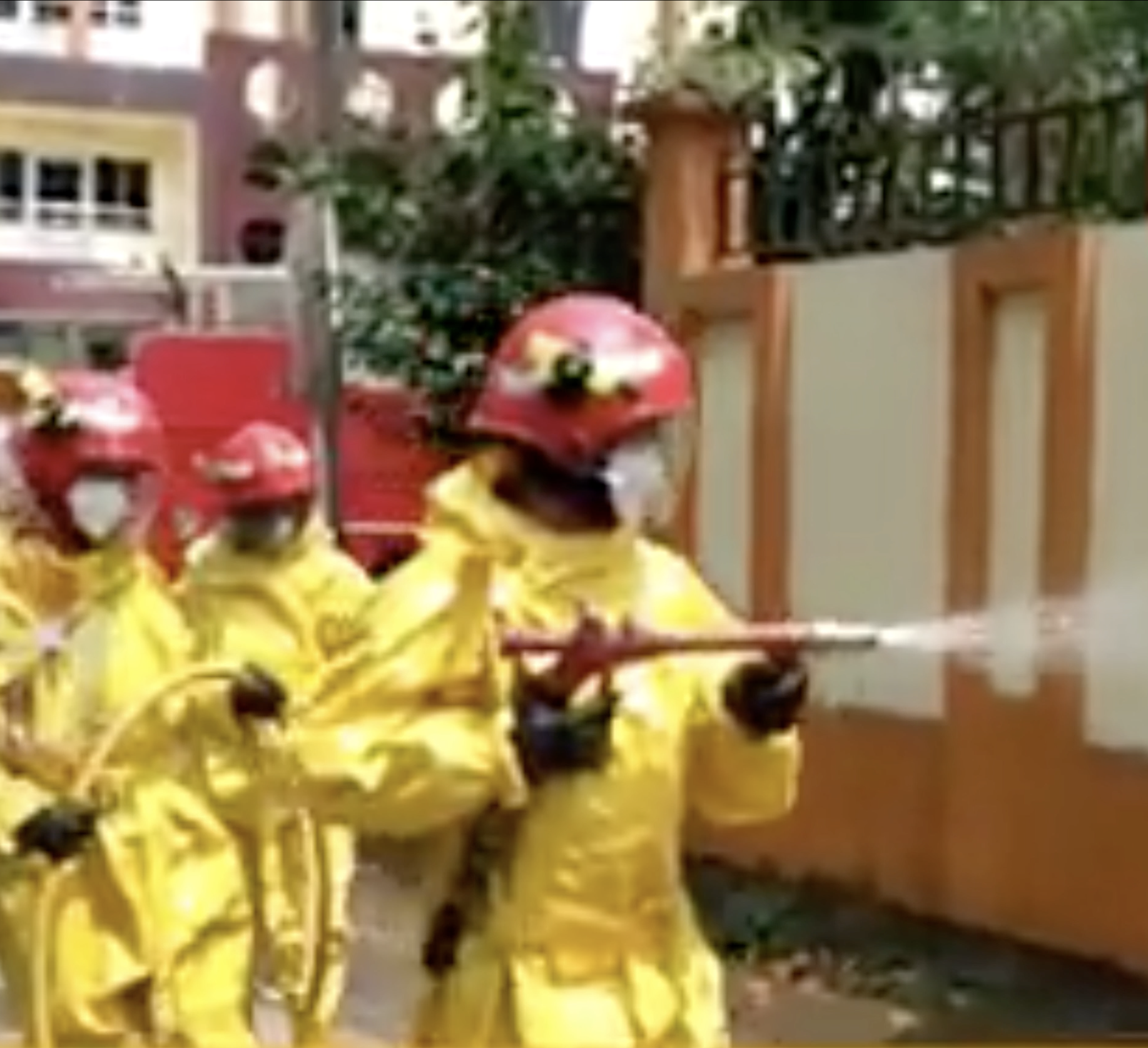
- Clockwise from top: A hospital ward in Guwahati in response to the 2020 COVID-19 pandemic; COVID-19 pandemic emergency response meeting in Assam; Sanitization of an apartment complex in Golaghat in response to COVID-19; COVID-19 Emergency and especial care hospital in Golaghat
- Disease: COVID-19
- Pathogen: SARS-CoV-2
- Location: Assam, India
- First outbreak: Wuhan, Hubei, China
- Index case: Srigouri, Badarpur, Dist. Karimganj; 24°51′35″N 92°31′51″E
- Date: 31 March 2020 – ongoing (6 years, 7 months and 2 days)
- Confirmed cases: ▲ (Note: 4 confirmed cases of Uttar Pradesh native, 2 confirmed cases of Tripura native, 1 confirmed case of Karnataka native and 1 confirmed case of Maharashtra native who have been tested positive for coronavirus in Assam are also included here)
- Territories: All 33 districts

Government website
- Assam COVID-19 Dashboard

The first case of the COVID-19 pandemic in the Indian state of Assam was reported on 31 March 2020. As of 2 November 2026, the Government of Assam has confirmed a total of (Note: 1 confirmed case of Nagaland native who was shifted from his native state to Assam for treatment in GMCH is not included here) positive cases of COVID-19 including recoveries, three migrations and deaths in the state. The state's as well as northeast's largest city, Guwahati, has been worst affected by coronavirus.

The COVID-19 outbreak in Assam has been traced to persons who attended the conference of the Tablighi Jamaat religious organisation at Nizamuddin Markaz (Delhi) and did not report to the authorities after their return to Assam. Out of the total patients of COVID-19 in Assam – 37 are either attendees or contacts of Tablighi Jamaat. The COVID-19 tally in Assam also shoots up due to some pilgrims of Ajmer Sharif Dargah (Rajasthan), who arrived in the Silchar city of Cachar district by bus on 6 May. Later on, 10 pilgrims tested positive for coronavirus and the others were sent to quarantine as per guidelines. The state witness spike in number of COVID-19 cases as migrant workers and many people of Assam stranded in other parts of the country returned to Assam. Many of them tested positive for coronavirus when they were in quarantine in the respective quarantine centres of the state.

In the fight against coronavirus, many frontline warriors of COVID-19 have also tested positive in Assam. Though many of them have later recovered, a very few have died. So far, the Assam Police has registered 3,005 COVID-19 cases among its personnel. Of them, 2,274 have recovered, 723 are undergoing treatment, while eight have died to the virus.

== Government Response ==
Though several people in the state have been found COVID-19 positive, there is no need to panic as the health department is prepared to deal with the situation and all patients are being provided with the best medical treatment.

— Assam Chief Minister Sarbananda Sonowal during interaction with the media, 7 April 2020.

Assam's fight against the novel coronavirus has been largely spearheaded by the state's Health Minister Himanta Biswa Sarma.

=== Health services and Quarantine strategy ===
The Government of Assam makes compulsory quarantine of 14 days for people coming from outside the state or country. Quarantine centre with 700 beds were set up at the Sarusojai Sports Complex and an apartment had been rented nearby by the government where at least 200 doctors can stay. Isolation wards of 200 beds in Sonapur Hospital, ICU ward of 30 beds in GMCH, 150 beds at MMCH and 50 beds in JMCH were set up by the government of Assam. A fully-functional, air-conditioned 236-bedded COVID-19 unit at GMCH, including 50 ICUs and 186 wards was also set up by the government. The government also upgraded Jalukbari Ayurvedic College (Guwahati) into a full-fledged COVID-19 hospital of 110-bed, Patanjali Yogpeeth (Mirza) into a full-fledged COVID-19 hospital of 250-bed and many more like those. Quarantine wards of 1500 beds were also set up for Assam Police Personnel. 30 doctors and around 200 nurses have also been kept exclusively for the police personnel. Nearly 10 lakh people have been screened across Assam, of which 72,957 passengers have been screened at six airports in the state.

On 15 April, the government imported 50,000 PPE kits from China and became the first and only state who has independently imported the kits from China.

In order to show gratitude towards the frontline warriors of COVID-19, the state government provided 14-days quarantine to all the doctors and nurses working round the clock attending COVID-19 positive patients at Taj Vivanta 5-star hotel. On 29 June, the government also recruited 3000 nurses in GMCH on regular basis in order to strengthen the nursing workforce in the fight against the rising no. of COVID-19 cases in Guwahati.

=== Containment strategy ===
On 15 March, the government of Assam shut down all educational institutions, cinema halls, multiplexes, gyms and swimming pools.

==== Quarantine ====
The following table shows the no. of persons who had completed their respective quarantine periods

Quarantine period	No. of peoples
28 days	143,705
14 days	151,398
Total	295,103
As of 12 June 2020

After the second wave of cases started with the entry of large no. of peoples in Assam from different parts of the country and abroad, home and institutional quarantine system started in the state. The given chart shows the status of quarantine persons

Home quarantine
Institutional quarantine

View source data.

==== Screening ====
The following table shows the no. of persons screened at different places in Assam

Places	No. of peoples
Airport (6)	72,957
Land Port (3)	61,673
Railway Station	207,156
Zonal Screening Point(5)	93,065
random	608,480
Total	10,43,331
As of 12 June 2020

==== Public awareness ====
The Government of Assam has started a YouTube channel for spreading awareness among public regarding the precautions to be taken against COVID-19. Also, the government has launched a mobile application called COVAAS for users to get information and updates regarding the COVID-19 in Assam. The app also incorporates application of lockdown epass, live help desk and many more. The government with the help of National Informatics Centre (NIC) of Assam, has launched an app called COVID Suraksha to monitor the status of each home quarantined persons.

=== Educational measures ===
The Assam government has directed the schools to provide students with course materials and short video lectures on topics in the syllabi through WhatsApp to prevent learning gaps during the closure of educational institutes. Even all the students of Higher Secondary first year of 2019–20 academic year have been promoted to second year without conducting any examination. The Assam government also directed private schools to waive 50 per cent of fees for the month of April. The schools have also been directed not to increase fees during lockdown and to pay teaching and non-teaching staff without a pay cut. The government also launched a local educational television channel Gyan Brikshya for classes I to XII, to cover the learning loss due to the COVID-19 pandemic and lockdown. The government is also going to waive all fees relating to admission and other categories like examinations, sports, registration, laboratory etc. for all students in all educational institutions under the Assam education board.

On 29 June, the government has decided to change the academic calendar for the schools of the state from January–December to April–March. The decision has been taken in order to compensate the loss of academic days due to COVID-19 lockdown.

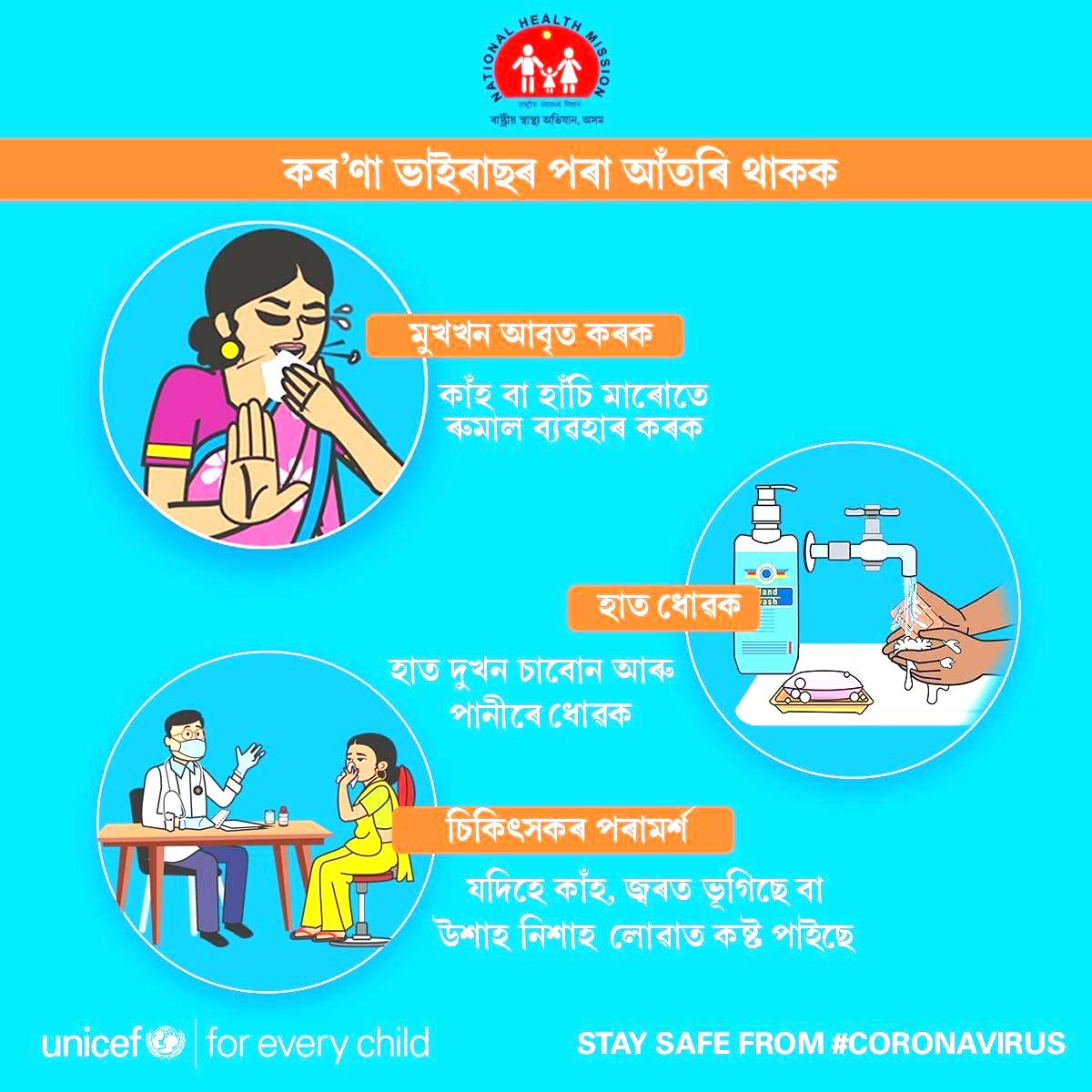
Coronavirus information poster in Assamese

=== Schemes and programmes launched ===
On 27 April, Chief minister Sarbananda Sonowal announced a life insurance cover of Rs 50 lakh to journalists. The state government also ensured to provide free COVID-19 testing for reporters. The government is also going to give Rs. 2000/month for three months to those people of Assam who are not returning to the state during lockdown. The government also gave $2000 in two installments to Assamese people stranded abroad. The government also gave Rs. 25000 to each cancer, kidney & heart patients in first installment and also gave another Rs. 25000 in second installment to the same patients stranded outside the state during the COVID-19 lockdown. To support the folk artistes/Lok Silpis of Assam in these challenging times, the government has decided to provide Rs. 2000 per month to each folk artistes for 3 months.

The CM also ordered to issue job cards to all the migrant workers returning to the state from different parts of the country. Along with jobs, the government is also going to give free food grains for 3 months to migrant workers returning to the state. Further, the state government increases the daily wage from Rs. 182 to Rs. 202 of the workers under MGNREGA in order to provide relief to the migrant labourers who are returning to their home state. The Assam government further decided to provide 5 kg rice per month to all those poor families who do not have a ration card.

The government has also launched a scheme called Dhanwantari to make home delivery of locally unavailable medicines amid lockdown restrictions but later limited to quarantined people only due to relaxations in Lockdown rules. The government has also allocated Rs. 20,000 towards the expenditure in quarantining each person arriving from outside the state.

=== Lockdown 3.0 ===
During Lockdown 3.0, the Assam government has barred people above 65 years and children below 12 years from venturing out of their homes except for medical reasons. Female employees, both in private and public sectors, with children below 5 years of age, are also barred by the government not to attend office. Also the Government strictly imposed curfew across all zones in the state from 6 pm to 6 am and all movement have been restricted during this period except emergency services like medical services, fire services and many more.

=== Community surveillance programme ===
The government of Assam also deployed 1,000 medical teams including doctors, nurses, medical staffs and health workers to around 25000 villages across the state to check people with seasonal fever and other COVID-19 like symptoms. The government also deployed Asha workers and MPW to monitor the home quarantine patients. In an effort to map and understand the spreading of the novel Coronavirus in Assam a non-governmental organization, has launched the first-ever serological survey in the state.

==== COVID-19 counseling/screening centers ====
In order to flatten the increasing curve of COVID-19 in Guwahati city, counseling centers have been set up in each of the wards in the city. Altogether 33 such centers have been activated including the ones in GMCH and MMCH. The centers will provide voluntary testing to the peoples and instant test results. All these centres will function from schools and will have ambulances, doctors, nurses and paramedics along with lab technicians. On July 27, the government set up 60 more COVID-19 screening centres in Guwahati, taking the total strength to 103.

=== Lockdown extensions ===
In view of the rising number of COVID-19 cases in many parts of Guwahati, the government imposed 14-days lockdown in 11 wards of Guwahati from 9 pm on June 23 onwards. The wards covers areas like Kamakhya, Maligaon, Fatasil, Panbazar and Fancy Bazaar. The order strictly prohibited the movement of individuals in those wards along with suspension of all activities in the areas excluding medical and fire services. The government though allowed opening of grocery shops, petrol pumps, medicine shops etc. from 10 am to 5 pm on the respective days. The government strictly warned people to follow lockdown norms, otherwise legal action under Section 188 will be taken against those violators.

On 26 June, the government announced a complete lockdown in Guwahati from June 28 midnight until July 12 due to the rapid increase in the number of COVID-19 cases in the city. On July 11, the government announced further extension of lockdown by a week until July 19 in Guwahati.

==== Weekend lockdown ====
The government also enforced weekend lockdown from June 27 in all town committees and municipalities across Assam until further orders. The lockdown will be enforced on all Saturdays and Sundays every week.

Besides lockdown, the government also imposed night curfew across the state from 7 pm to 7 am.

=== Evacuation ===
The Government evacuated 391 students of Assam, who were stranded at Kota, Rajasthan. All the students have been kept under quarantine for 14 days. The govt with the help of government of Gujarat, also brought 104 students of Assam stranded in different parts of Gujarat.

=== Legal actions ===
The government strictly warned people not to violate quarantine rules otherwise a criminal case of non-bailable offence will be filed against those violators. The government of Assam makes it mandatory to wear mask in public and strongly warned people to follow the order otherwise a fine of Rs 500 ($6.60 ) will be charged from the violators.

As of 29 June, 3,444 cases have been registered, 4,609 persons have been arrested, 30,256 vehicles have been seized and more than Rs 4.35 crore have been collected as fines in the state for defying lockdown rules.

== Repatriation of expats ==
Under the Vande Bharat Mission of massive repatriation operation that have been planned by the Indian government to bring back stranded Indians in different parts of the world in the wake of the coronavirus crisis, Assam also witnessed five repatriation from different countries.

Date	Airport/Int. check post	Arrived from	Passengers	Confirmed positive
28 May 2020	Sutarkandi Int. check post	Bangladesh	100	0
29 May 2020	Guwahati airport	Kuwait	155	30
3 June 2020	Guwahati airport	Moscow	37	0
4 June 2020	Guwahati airport	Kyiv	69	0
4 July 2020	Guwahati airport	Dubai	189	0
Total			550	30

On 28 May, 100 Indians stranded in different parts of Bangladesh returned to Assam via Karimganj's Sutarkandi international check post.

On 29 May, a flight carrying 155 passengers arrived from Kuwait at the Lokpriya Gopinath Bordoloi International Airport, Guwahati. Later, out of the total passengers, 30 tested positive for coronavirus.

On 3 June, another flight carrying 37 passengers arrived from Moscow at the LGBI Airport, Guwahati.

On 4 June, another flight carrying 69 passengers arrived from Ukraine's Kyiv at the LGBI Airport, Guwahati.

On 4 July, another flight carrying 189 passengers arrived from Dubai at the LGBI Airport, Guwahati.

== Sample testing and treatment ==
As of 17 November 2020, 5,018,957 COVID-19 tests have been conducted in the 17 laboratories and some screening centres in Assam along with some outsourced (private) labs.

Initially, the labs tested samples only from those with a history of travel to other countries or areas outside Assam designated as high risk, those who had come into contact with anyone testing positive for coronavirus, and those who were showing the symptoms specified in government guidelines. Moreover, 1,421 out of the total tests were conducted on people linked with Nizamuddin Markaz in which 37 tested positive.

On July 1, the government launched a website where people would be able to get their test results after entering their Specimen Referral Form (SRF) ID.

On July 3, the state begins antigen testing for coronavirus, which produced results within an hour.

On July 7, the state healthcare authorities have launched door-to-door COVID-19 tests in Ward-2 (Pandu), following a spike in the viral outbreak cases in Guwahati. On July 21, the government started random COVID-19 testing in Kamrup Metro district, especially in Guwahati city.

=== Targeted surveillance programme ===
On 17 June, the government launched a surveillance programme, under which swab samples of various people were collected and tested, which includes workers of truck parking areas and dhabas, staffs of hotels used as institutional quarantine, police personnels and the family members, co-residents of homes of people released from the institutional quarantine.

As of 2 August, 166,309 persons have been tested under this programme.

=== Graphs ===
Total samples tested

View source data.

New tests per day

View source data.

=== Treatment ===
After the city witnessed sharp increase in COVID-19 cases, the government set up plasma bank in Guwahati and started collection of blood plasma from the patients who have been cured of COVID-19. On July 9, the state started plasma therapy at GMCH on a serious patient admitted in ICU. So far, 155 people have donated their plasma. Remdesivir, an antiviral drug has been given to serious patients, which showed positive results.

Assam also became the first state to procure Itolizumab for the treatment of COVID-19 patients.

== Impact ==
=== Economy ===
The state's economy has been hit hard due to COVID-19 pandemic and lockdown. As a result, the Goods and Services Tax (GST) collection in Assam dropped by around 80 per cent in the month of April. The state collected only Rs 193 crore as GST collection, which is only around 20 per cent as compared to previous year. The collection though increased to Rs 360 crore in the month of May, it is still 40 percent compared to the previous year. Further, the state government had collected Rs 6.33 crore in April as foreign liquor tax which is just 10 percent as compared to March this year. Moreover, the monthly collection from the cess of petrol and diesel has also dropped from an average of Rs 340 crore to only just Rs 60 crore.

On account of the COVID-19 lockdown, normal operations in tea gardens were under shutdown from 25 March until 14 April, due to which the tea industry has incurred a loss of around Rs 1,059 crore in revenue. Along with tea industry, the tourism industry also suffered a great loss due to COVID-19 lockdown. According to sources, the industry suffers an estimated loss of around 60 crores of income. The government further estimates a loss of revenue of around Rs 500 crore from the state tourism industry.

According to the Advisory Committee for Revitalization of the Economy of Assam, the total loss in gross state domestic product in Assam due to the COVID-19 lockdown was estimated at Rs 32,167 crore.

=== Education ===
On July 9, the Tezpur University has cancelled its entrance examination for all programs. Earlier, it had to postponed the examination due to Lockdown and now had to cancel it due to spike in COVID-19 cases across the state. The Cotton University also decided to call off the exams for several courses. The university has cancelled the 2nd and 4th semester examination of graduation due to coronavirus. A preliminary decision, the Assam government is planning to reopen the schools and colleges in the state from September 1.

=== Religion and culture ===
Bohag Bihu celebrations, the state's biggest festival which marks the onset of spring and the beginning of the Assamese new year, was called off. Most rituals, except ceremonial flag hoisting, will be restricted with the social distancing norms amid COVID-19. The famous Kamakhya temple which host the biggest Ambubachi Mela, has called off all celebrations this year amid COVID-19. The temple authorities has decided that only religious rituals will be performed by the priests of the temple. Moreover, the Basistha temple and Sukreswar temple which hosts the month long Bolbom Celebration, has also decided to call off the celebration this year. The Ugratara Devalaya which hosts the Naga Panchami (Manasa Puja) every year, will not observe the Puja this year due to COVID-19.

== Relief funds and supplies ==
=== State relief fund ===
Assam Arogya Nidhi
Amount Received	109.41 crore (US$14.63 million)
No. of Donor	50,142
Date of Commencing	26-03-2020
Status	open
As of 6 May 2020

On 26 March 2020, Assam State Government launched the Assam Arogya Nidhi Fund for COVID-19 relief, and it is now seeking contributions to the fund from the public. The purpose of the fund is to help the state government in its efforts to combat the spread of coronavirus in Assam. As of 6 May 2020, over 50,000 people had donated around Rs 110 cr (1.1 billion rupees) to the Assam Arogya Nidhi fund.

The Income Tax Department and the Finance Ministry have declared that all donations to the fund are 100 per cent tax-deductible, being donations to a fund set up by a state government to provide medical relief to the poor under Sec 80G (1) of the Income tax Act.

Many well-known businessmen, social activists, government employees, sports personalities, religious trusts and even ordinary members of the public have contributed to the Assam Arogya Nidhi fund. Guwahati-based businessman and social activist Anand Kumar Jain donated over Rs 2 crore (20 million rupees) to support the fight against coronavirus. Three other businessmen from Assam also contributed sizable amounts to the fund: Anil Das donated Rs 50 lakh (5 million rupees), Anupam Sarma Rs 25 lakh (2.5 million rupees) and Aditya Goswami Rs 21 lakh (2.1 million rupees). The Kamakhya Temple contributed Rs. 5 lakh (500,000 rupees). Asian Games gold medallist Hima Das donated one month's salary. Reema Ghosh, a college student from Assam's Rangia area, gave Rs 1.93 lakh (193,000 rupees) that her parents had been saving for her marriage. All the government employees of Assam have donated their one-day salary to the Chief Minister's Relief Fund.

=== Masks and supplies ===
On 5 April, Akshaya Patra Foundation, Assam has donated 5000 essential groceries kits, each weighing 12.06 kg, for 21 days.

On 13 April, Mukesh Ambani, chairman of Reliance Industries Limited has donated 10 thousand PPE kits to Assam. On 20 April, Assam received a total of 9,600 COVID-19 rapid testing kits from the Government of India, which can detect the virus in a person's body within 15 minutes.

On 28 April, Pernod Ricard India Foundation has donated 20,000 three-layered masks and 20,500 litres of sanitizers to the Assam. On 29 April, Ratan Tata has contributed 45,000 COVID-19 protective masks to Assam. On the same day, Apollo Hospital, Guwahati has donated 5,000 pieces of facemasks as a support to the Assam Government's fight against COVID-19.

On 3 June, the Circle Chief General Manager and General Managers of SBI has donated PPE kits, in order to boost up the strength of Assam's COVID-19 frontline warriors.

In order to boost testing capabilities, Indian Institute of Technology (IIT) Guwahati has developed several low-cost and high-quality 'Made in Assam' COVID-19 kits including VTM kits, RT-PCR kits and RNA isolation kits, which was finally handed over to Assam government on June 17.

== Statistics ==
COVID-19 pandemic in Assam by districts
S.No.	District	Active Cases	Recovered cases	Deaths	Total Cases
1	Kamrup Metropolitan	6,008 (Note: The figure doesn't includes three migrations.)	14,599	54	23,125
2	Dibrugarh	1,501	2,409	30	5,690
3	Tinsukia	1,551	1,798	18	5,059
4	Kamrup Rural	820	2,074	15	4,508
5	Cachar	1,794	1,498	18	4,469
6	Jorhat	1,576	1,752	10	4,338
7	Nagaon	1,385	2,506	6	4,175
8	Dhubri	507	1,215	2	3,209
9	Golaghat	729	1,656	4	3,056
10	Sonitpur	621	1,727	3	2,927
11	Darrang	232	1,730	8	2,619
12	Hojai	184	1,160	1	2,100
13	Lakhimpur	131	1,135	1	2,009
14	Barpeta	96	1,024	2	1,989
15	Hailakandi	269	1,116	5	1,782
16	Bongaigaon	279	834	2	1,709
17	Karimganj	62	955	14	1,525
18	Nalbari	117	828	3	1,248
19	Kokrajhar	51	353	5	1,107
20	Goalpara	90	568	1	1,058
21	Morigaon	79	557	2	1,038
22	Udalguri	91	666	3	938
23	Sivasagar	54	473	3	758
24	Dhemaji	61	440	1	709
25	Karbi Anglong	76	552	7	638
26	Biswanath	70	397	0	597
27	Baksa	39	447	2	586
28	Chirang	61	219	0	359
29	Dima Hasao	38	199	0	313
30	Majuli	85	80	0	248
31	Charaideo	7	105	1	192
32	South Salmara- Mankachar	4	47	0	79
33	West Karbi Anglong	2	37	0	48
	Unknown	—	—	—	—
Total		23,753*	60,348	221	84,317
*Excluding migrations
As of 2 November 2026

=== Total confirmed cases, active cases, recoveries and deaths ===
Total confirmed cases
Active Cases
Recoveries
Deaths

==== Linear scale ====
View source data.

==== Logarithmic scale ====
View source data.

=== Active cases ===
Active Cases

View source data.

=== Daily new cases ===
New cases per day

View source data.

=== Daily new recoveries ===
Recoveries per day

View source data.

=== Daily new deaths ===
New deaths per day

View source data.

=== Fatality rate ===
Fatality rate per day

View source data.

== Confirmed deaths ==
Age-wise COVID-19 deaths in Assam
Age group	Percent
0-17	0.45%
18-40	12.22%
41-59	40.72%
60+	46.61%

Age group	Deaths	Male	Female
0-17	1	0	1
18-40	27	17	10
41-59	90	76	14
60+	103	80	23
Total	221	173	48

Details for Assam's COVID-19 cases who died outside Assam
Case order	Age	Gender	Native	Hospital admitted to	Place of Death	Status	Note
1	55	Male	Barpeta	Safdarjung Hospital	New Delhi, India	Died on 28 April	A CRPF personnel who was a Sub-Inspector from the 31 battalions died in Delhi's Safdarjung Hospital due to COVID-19. He tested coronavirus positive a week before his death.
2	—	Male	Hojai	Saint George Hospital	Mumbai, India	Died on 3 May	A youth from Assam's Hojai district died in Mumbai's Saint George Hospital due to COVID-19. He was admitted to Hospital three days before his death after he developed abdominal pain and diarrhea.
3	—	Male	Golaghat	—	Delhi, India	Died on 16 May	A man from Assam's Bokakhat died in Delhi due to COVID-19. The man went to Delhi for the cancer treatment of his wife, but both of them tested positive for COVID-19 later on. Though his wife survived, he died while he was under treatment.
4	36	Female	Lakhimpur	AIIMS	New Delhi, India	Died on 17 June	The deceased was first admitted to two private hospitals due to the unavailability of beds in government hospitals but due to lack of testing facilities there, she was later admitted to AIIMS where she tested positive and later died from COVID-19 as the infection had already spread in her respiratory tract, which lead to allegations of medical negligence at both private hospitals.
5	53	Male	Nagaon	AIIMS, Jhajjar	Haryana, India	Died on 28 June	A CRPF personnel who was a Sub-Inspector from the 9th battalion died due to COVID-19 on Sunday. The deceased undergone plasma therapy at Jhajjar AIIMS, where he was admitted.

=== COVID-19 related deaths ===
On 11 April, a 30-year-old migrant worker from Assam's Nagaon district reportedly committed suicide by cutting his throat at a government hospital in the city of Akola in Maharashtra, where he was undergoing treatment for COVID-19. The man had tested positive for coronavirus after returning from the Tablighi Jamaat conference at Nizamuddin Markaz.

On 18 June, A COVID-19 patient died at Fakhruddin Ali Ahmed Medical College and Hospital (Barpeta) after he was critically injured while trying to abscond from the hospital. The deceased hails from Jogighopa in Bongaigaon district. The man was admitted to the hospital and was in ventilator after he got serious injuries in his head while escaping.

=== Under reportation of death related to COVID-19 ===
Official death from COVID-19 virus stand at 234 (as of 17-06-2021). These report are as per Urban death. Death related to rural Assam are sparse to unavailable.

== COVID-19 Vaccines with Approval for Emergency or Conditional Usage ==
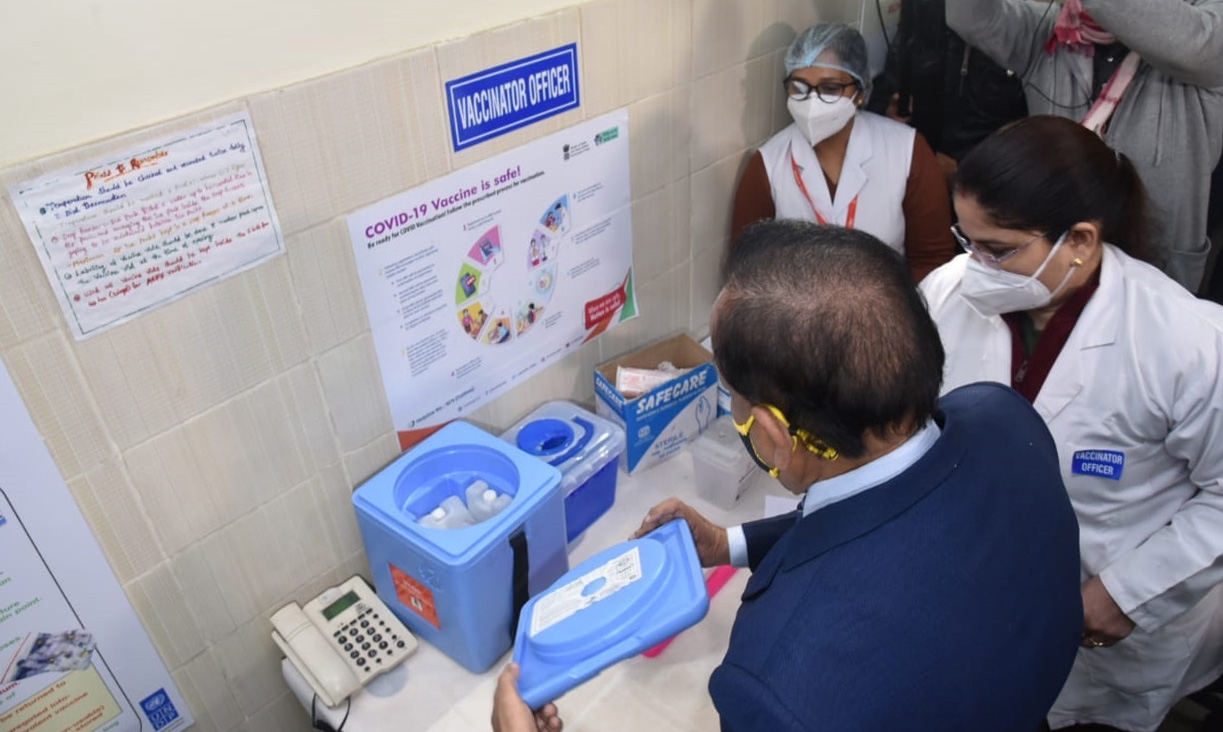
Union Minister for Health & Family Welfare, Dr. Harsh Vardhan visiting the GTB Hospital, Shahdara to review the preparedness of Dry Run of COVID-19 vaccine, in Delhi on January 02, 2021.

=== Covishield ===
On January 1, 2021, the Drug Controller General of India, approved the emergency or conditional use of AstraZeneca's COVID-19 vaccine AZD1222 (marketed as Covishield). Covishield is developed by the University of Oxford and its spin-out company, Vaccitech. It's a viral vector vaccine based on replication-deficient Adenovirus that causes cold in Chimpanzees. It can be stored, transported and handled at normal refrigerated conditions (two-eight degrees Celsius/ 36-46 degrees Fahrenheit). It has a shelf-life of at least six months.

On 12 January 2021 first batches of Covishield vaccine was despatched from the Serum Institute of India.

=== Covaxin ===
On January 2, 2021, BBV152 (marketed as Covaxin), first indigenous vaccine, developed by Bharat Biotech in association with the Indian Council of Medical Research and National Institute of Virology received approval from the Drug Controller General of India for its emergency or conditional usage.

On 14 January 2021 first batches of Covaxin vaccine was despatched from the Bharat Biotech, albeit it was still in the third phase of testing.

=== Others ===
On 19 May 2021, Dr Reddy's Labs received Emergency Use Authorisation for anti-COVID drug 2-DG. On 21 February 2022, Drugs Controller General of India granted approval to Biological E's COVID-19 vaccine Corbevax, that can be used for children between 12 and 18 years of age.

On 21 October 2021, India completed administering of one billion Covid vaccines in the country.

On 8 January 2022, India crossed 1.5 billion Covid vaccines milestone in the country.

On 19 February 2022, India crossed 1.75 billion Covid vaccines milestone in the country.

== Timeline of cases ==
=== March 2020 ===
Major events of COVID-19 pandemic in March
31 March	First confirmed case

The first confirmed case and coronavirus in Assam was reported on 31 March 2020 in Srigouri village of Badarpur, Karimganj, after a 52-year-old man returning from Nizamuddin Markaz tested positive at Silchar Medical College.

=== April 2020 ===
Major events of COVID-19 pandemic in April
10 April	First death reported

- On 1 April, four more people, three from Jagiroad and one from Nalbari, tested positive for coronavirus at Gauhati Medical College and Hospital (GMCH), increasing the number of cases to 5. All five patients had attended the Tablighi Jamaat conference at Nizamuddin Markaz. The same day, eight more patients from Golaghat tested positive, bringing the total number to 13, all of whom had attended the Nizamuddin Markaz event.
- On 2 April, three new coronavirus cases were detected in Assam. Three persons from Goalpara who had attended the Tablighi Jamat conference at Nizamuddin Markaz were diagnosed with coronavirus. The total number of coronavirus cases in Assam now numbered 16.
- On 3 April, four new coronavirus cases were detected in Assam's Nalbari and South Salmara. All had attended the conference at Nizamuddin Markaz. The same day, three more positive cases were confirmed, including the first case in Guwahati, the state capital. Two of these cases were connected with the event at Nizamuddin Markaz.
- On 4 April, a coronavirus case was confirmed in each of the following locations in Assam: Golaghat, the town of North Lakhimpur and Cachar district. In all three cases, the patient had attended the conference at Nizamuddin Markaz.
- On 7 April, a person linked to the same conference was diagnosed coronavirus-positive in Chapar, Dhubri district. The same day, one more COVID-19 case, in a person with a history of travel to Saudi Arabia who had also attended the Tablighi Jamaat conference, was detected in Assam's Hailakandi district. This was the first case in Assam of COVID-19 in a person who had travelled outside India.
- On 9 April, a person was diagnosed coronavirus positive in Bilasipara at Dhubri district. The person had been in contact with a coronavirus patient from the same district, so this was a case of infection indirectly related to the Tablighi Jamaat conference.
- On 10 April, Assam reported its first COVID-19-linked death in Hailakandi district. A 65-year-old man with pneumonia who had been to Saudi Arabia and then visited Nizamuddin Markaz died in the early morning at Silchar Medical College and Hospital.
- On 13 April, another person linked to Nizamuddin Markaz tested positive for COVID-19 at Barpeta Medical College in Assam's Dhubri district. On the same day, a patient from Assam's Goalpara district tested positive for COVID-19 after coming into contact with a person associated with Nizamuddin Markaz.
- On 14 April, another person tested positive for COVID-19 in Dhubri district. The patient was the wife of a COVID-19-positive patient who had attended the Tablighi Jamaat conference and then travelled to an event at the Athgaon Kabristhan mosque which became a COVID-19 hotspot in Assam.
- On 15 April, two COVID-19 patients from Morigaon district with links to the Tablighi Jamaat conference were reported recovered from the disease. They were released from Sonapur district hospital after their samples were found to be negative in repeated tests.
- On 16 April, two people from Lahorighat in Morigaon district tested positive for COVID-19. The patients had come into contact with a COVID-19-positive person who attended the Tablighi Jamaat conference. The same day, three COVID-19 patients from Goalpara district who had recovered from the disease were discharged from Goalpara Civil Hospital.
- On 17 April, four more COVID-19 patients were reported recovered from the disease after their samples were found negative in four successive tests. All were from Golaghat district and were linked with the Tablighi Jamaat conference. They were released from Swahid Kushal Konwar Civil Hospital.
- On 18 April, Three more COVID-19 patients were discharged from two different hospitals. Two patients from Mahendra Mohan Choudhury Hospital in Guwahati and one patient from Silchar Medical College and Hospital were released after their results of 3-4 successive tests came negative.
- On 19 April, Five more COVID-19 patients were discharged from two different hospitals. Four patients from Mahendra Mohan Choudhury Hospital in Guwahati and one patient from Gauhati Medical College and Hospital were released after their results of 3-4 successive tests came negative.
- On 20 April, two more COVID-19 patients were discharged from two different hospitals. One patient from Sonapur Civil Hospital and one patient from Telahi Model Hospital in Lakhimpur district were released after their results of 2-3 successive tests came negative.
- On 23 April, another person tested positive for COVID-19 in Bilasipara at Dhubri district. The patient came in contact with a COVID-19-positive patient who had attended the Athgaon Kabristhan mosque event which became a COVID-19 hotspot in Assam.
- On 26 April, Eight more COVID-19 patients were discharged from two different hospitals. Four patients from Mahendra Mohan Choudhury Hospital in Guwahati and the other four from Golaghat Hospital were released after their results of 3-4 successive tests came negative.
- On 28 April, A 16-year-old girl from Salmara in Bongaigaon district has tested positive for coronavirus. The girl is the secondary contact of a Nizamuddin Markaz attendee and also the youngest patient as of now. On the same day, a patient from Assam's Goalpara district has tested positive for COVID-19 who is also the secondary contact of a Nizamuddin Markaz attendee in Delhi.
- On 29 April 2020, two COVID-19 patients, one from Dhubri district and another from Goalpara district were reported recovered from the disease. They have been discharged from Mahendra Mohan Chourdhury Hospital in Guwahati after their samples were found to be negative in repeated tests.
- On 30 April, four new COVID-19 positive cases detected in Bongaigaon district. On the same day, one more COVID-19 positive case was detected in Karimganj district, making the state tally to 42. The patient came in contact with a COVID-19 positive patient from the same district, who was an attendee of the Nizamuddin Markaz event.

=== May 2020 ===
Major events of COVID-19 pandemic in May
17 May	100 confirmed cases
25 May	500 confirmed cases
28 May	100 reported recoveries
29 May	1000 confirmed cases

- On 1 May, three more COVID-19 patients were reported recovered from the disease. Two patients from Mahendra Mohan Choudhury Hospital and one patient from Golaghat Hospital have been discharged after their samples were found to be negative in repeated tests.
- On 5 May, another person tested positive for COVID-19 in Goalpara district, taking the state tally to 43. The person who tested positive was under containment zone. On the same day, one more person tested positive for coronavirus in Kokrajhar district, taking the state tally to 44. The person who tested positive have a travel history of Cooch Behar in West Bengal.
- On 6 May, two more COVID-19 patients were reported recovered from the disease, including the first COVID-19 patient of Assam. One patient from Mahendra Mohan Choudhury Hospital and one patient from Silchar Medical College and Hospital have been discharged after their samples were found to be negative in repeated tests. On the same day, a person tested positive for COVID-19 in Cachar district, taking the state tally to 45. The person who tested positive is a dreaded criminal against whom there are several cases. The person came to Silchar by bus from Ajmer where he visited the Ajmer Sharif. The person is a resident of Sonitpur district.
- On 7 May, four people from Cachar district tested positive for coronavirus, increasing the number of cases to 49. All the positive patients came to Silchar from Ajmer by bus. They came in contact with another person tested positive yesterday, who was travelling on the same bus with them. On the same day, four more people from Guwahati tested positive for coronavirus, increasing the number of cases to 53. One patient from the four tested positive, came from outside Assam and was in home quarantine. Another patient is a doctor of GMCH who is also a PG student of GMCH. Late night, Assam reported its second COVID-19 death in Guwahati. A 16-year-old girl who had cancer died due to coronavirus on that day. Her swab tested positive for the virus after her death which was a serious mistake committed by the doctors by not testing her samples before her death.
- On 8 May, three more people from Cachar district tested positive for coronavirus, increasing the number of cases to 56. All the positive patients also came to Silchar from Ajmer by bus. They came in contact with another person tested positive a day before yesterday, who was travelling on the same bus with them. On the same day, two more people from Cachar district tested positive for coronavirus, increasing the number of cases to 58. The patients tested positive have also came from Ajmer Sharif Dargah in Rajasthan. At the end of the day, one more people from Guwahati tested positive for coronavirus, increasing the number of cases to 59. The person who tested positive is a student of Regional Dental College in Guwahati.
- On 9 May, three more people tested positive for COVID-19 in Jorhat district, taking the state tally to 62. The patients includes an Ambulance driver who drove the other two persons tested positive. The driver has been sent back to Mumbai while the other 2 positive patients are under treatment at JMCH.
- On 11 May, two more persons tested positive for COVID-19 in Guwahati, taking the state tally to 64. One of them is originally from Morigaon district who had tested positive in Guwahati. On the same day, five more COVID-19 patients were reported recovered from the disease. All the patients have been discharged from Mahendra Mohan Choudhury Hospital (Guwahati), after their samples were found to be negative in repeated tests.
- On 13 May, 15 more persons tested positive for COVID-19 in Guwahati, taking the state tally to 79. All the patients came in contact with another person tested positive a day before yesterday at Guwahati's Fancy Bazaar.
- On 14 May, seven more people from Guwahati tested positive for coronavirus, increasing the number of cases to 86. The persons who tested positive are cancer patients, heart patients and attendants who came from Mumbai.
- On 15 May, one more COVID-19 patient reported recovered from the disease. The patient have been discharged from SMCH after the patient's sample found to be negative in repeated tests. On the same day, three more people from Guwahati tested positive for coronavirus, increasing the number of cases to 89. One of the person was in quarantine at the Sarusajai stadium, and one was an indoor patient of GMCH and another has migrated to West Bengal.
- On 16 May, two more people from Guwahati tested positive for coronavirus, increasing the number of cases to 91. The patients includes a barber and a cart-puller who came in contact with a migrant worker who worked in a potato godown and had tested positive a couple of days ago. On the same day, one more person from Sonitpur district tested positive for coronavirus, taking the state tally to 92.
- On 17 May, two more people from Guwahati tested positive for coronavirus, increasing the number of cases to 94. The patients have been shifted to Mahendra Mohan Choudhury Hospital in Guwahati. On the same day, one more person from Sivasagar district tested positive for coronavirus, taking the state tally to 95. The patient is a young boy who tested positive at Jorhat quarantine centre. The same day, another person tested positive for COVID-19 in Jorhat district, taking the state tally to 96. The patient is a nine-year-old boy who returned from Delhi with his family and came in contact with another patient tested positive earlier in the day. The same day, another person tested positive for coronavirus in Cachar district, taking the state tally to 97. The patient, a 28-year-old, had returned from Chennai yesterday and has been sent to SMCH after he tested positive today. Late Night, three more people tested positive for coronavirus at Sarusajai Quarantine Centre in Guwahati, taking the state tally to 100. The patients tested positive are returnees from other parts of the country, two from Mumbai and one from Bihar.
- On 18 May, two more persons, one from Titabor in Jorhat district and another from Nagaon district, tested positive for coronavirus. Both of them tested positive at quarantine centres. On the same day, two more persons tested positive for coronavirus in Golaghat district. The same day, Assam registers its third COVID-19 death after a cancer patient, who returned from Mumbai, died at the GMCH. The same day, two more persons tested positive for coronavirus in Cachar district, taking the state tally to 106. The same day, two more persons tested positive for coronavirus in Golaghat district. Late night, seven more persons tested positive for coronavirus in Guwahati, taking the state tally to 115. Three of them tested positive at Sarusajai quarantine centre, another three are related with potato godown at Fancy Bazaar containment zone and one of them died at GMCH prior to detection, which resulted in a 2nd COVID-19 death in a single day taking the total death toll to 4.
- On 19 May, 42 more persons; 20 from Guwahati, 7 from Kamrup, 2 each from Hojai, Biswanath, Nalbari, Jorhat, Golaghat, Karimganj, Nagaon and 1 from Kokrajhar, tested positive for coronavirus in Assam, taking the total tally to 157. The patients includes returnees from Chennai and Darjeeling. It also includes a two-month-old baby. Two of the patients are contacts of a cancer patient died yesterday and remaining cases are from Sarusajai quarantine centre.
- On 20 May, 28 more persons; 15 from Guwahati, 8 from Hojai, 2 from Sonitpur, 1 each from Karimganj, Kamrup and Nagaon tested positive for coronavirus, taking the state tally to 185. Most of the patients tested positive at the respective quarantine centres. The same day, 7 patients; 4 from SMCH, 2 from JMCH and 1 PG student from GMCH were reported recovered from the disease and were also discharged from the hospital.
- On 21 May, 25 more persons; 5 each from Sonitpur and Kokrajhar, 4 from Barpeta, 2 each from Lakhimpur, Sivasagar, Dhubri and West Karbi Anglong, 1 each from Dibrugarh, Darrang, and Udalguri tested positive for coronavirus, taking the state tally to 210. The same day, 6 persons; 4 from SMCH and 2 from MMCH, were reported recovered from the disease and were also discharged from the hospital. Most of the patients tested positive are from the respective quarantine centres at Guwahati, Kokrajhar, Tezpur and remaining tested positive at Barpeta Medical College.
- On 22 May, 49 more persons; 27 from Guwahati, 8 from Cachar, 6 from Sonitpur, 3 from Sivasagar, 1 each from Hailakandi, Lakhimpur, Udalguri, Nagaon and Tinsukia tested positive for coronavirus, taking the state tally to 259. Most of the patients tested positive are from the respective quarantine centres at Tezpur, Jorhat, Silchar and Guwahati and remaining tested positive at SMCH and MMCH.
- On 23 May, 87 more persons; 2 from Tripura, 44 from Guwahati, 7 from Dima Hasao, 6 from Hojai, 5 from Cachar, 4 each from Morigaon, Chirang and Tinsukia, 3 from Hailakandi, 2 from Nalbari, 1 each from Dhubri, Nagaon, Hojai, Golaghat, Jorhat, Goalpara, tested positive for coronavirus, taking the total tally to 346. Most of the patients tested positive are from the respective quarantine centres at Guwahati and Dhubri. The same day, 3 persons; 1 from MMCH and 2 from GMCH were reported recovered from the disease (including one dentist) and were also discharged from the hospital.
- On 24 May, 46 more persons tested positive for coronavirus in Assam, taking the state tally to 392. Most of the patients tested positive were in quarantine in the respective quarantine centres in Assam.
- On 25 May, 156 more persons tested positive for coronavirus in Assam, taking the state tally to 548. The same day five patients, three from GMCH and two from JMCH were reported recovered from the disease and were also discharged from the hospital.
- On 26 May, 134 more persons tested positive for coronavirus in Assam, taking the state tally to 682. Most of the patients tested positive are returnees from various states and were in quarantine in the respective quarantine centres in Assam.
- On 27 May, 101 more persons tested positive for coronavirus in Assam, taking the state tally to 783. The same day 25 patients, 22 from MMCH, two from SMCH and one from JMCH were reported recovered from the disease and were also discharged from the hospital.
- On 28 May, 97 more persons tested positive for coronavirus in Assam, taking the state tally to 880. The same day 16 patients, 15 from MMCH and one from SMCH were reported recovered from the disease and were also discharged from the hospital.
- On 29 May, 177 more persons tested positive for coronavirus in Assam, taking the state tally to 1,057. The same day 22 patients, 12 from MMCH, 6 from GMCH, 3 from SMCH and 1 from JMCH were reported recovered from the disease and were also discharged from the hospital.
- On 30 May, 159 more persons tested positive for coronavirus in Assam, taking the state tally to 1,216. The same day 38 patients, 14 from SMCH, 11 from MMCH, 8 from FAAMC, 3 from JMCH and 2 from GMCH were reported recovered from the disease and were also discharged from the hospital.
- On 31 May, 145 more persons tested positive for coronavirus in Assam, taking the state tally to 1,361. The same day 22 patients, 16 from MMCH, 4 from SMCH and 2 from JMCH were reported recovered from the disease and were also discharged from the hospital.

=== June 2020 ===
Major events of COVID-19 pandemic in June
5 June	500 reported recoveries
9 June	1000 reported recoveries
15 June	Reported recoveries surpassed active cases
19 June	5000 confirmed cases
23 June	Announced lockdown in 11 wards in Guwahati till 7 July
27 June	Announced weekend lockdown in urban centres except Guwahati
27 June	10 reported deaths
28 June	Announced complete lockdown in Guwahati till 12 July
28 June	5000 reported recoveries

- On 1 June, 124 more persons tested positive for coronavirus in Assam, taking the state tally to 1,485. The same day 99 patients, 46 from Kalapahar Hospital, 22 from MMCH, 13 from TMCH, 8 from SMCH, 7 from JMCH, 2 from FAAMC and 1 from AMCH were reported recovered from the disease and were also discharged from the hospital.
- On 2 June, 76 more persons tested positive for coronavirus in Assam, taking the state tally to 1,561. The same day 53 patients, 18 from SMCH,.12 from Golaghat District Hospital, 10 from GMCH, 9 from MMCH, 2 from FAAMCH and 1 each from DMCH and Dhemaji District Hospital were reported recovered from the disease and were also discharged from the hospital.
- On 3 June, 269 more persons tested positive for coronavirus in Assam, taking the state tally to 1,830. The same day 76 patients, 39 from Sonapur Civil Hospital, 10 from FAAMCH, 7 from Dima Hasao Civil Hospital, 4 from GMCH, 3 from JMCH, 2 from SMCH, 1 from MMCH, 5 each from Golaghat and Lakhimpur civil hospital were reported recovered from the disease and were also discharged from the hospital.
- On 4 June, 285 more persons tested positive for coronavirus in Assam, taking the state tally to 2,115. The same day 46 patients, 15 from Sonapur hospital, 14 from MMCH, 5 from FAAMCH, 4 from SMCH, 3 from Golaghat hospital, 1 from GMCH, 2 each from Dhemaji civil and district hospital were reported recovered from the disease and were also discharged from the hospital.
- On 5 June, 128 more persons tested positive for coronavirus in Assam, taking the state tally to 2,243. The same day 50 patients, 13 from MMCH, 6 from Golaghat hospital, 5 from JMCH, 3 from AMCH, 1 from SMCH and 11 each from FAAMCH & TMCH were reported recovered from the disease and were also discharged from the hospital.
- On 6 June, 230 more persons tested positive for coronavirus in Assam, taking the state tally to 2,473. The same day 79 patients, 23 from Kalapahar hospital, 10 each from MMCH & Nagaon district hospital, 8 from GMCH, 7 each from JMCH & TMCH, 5 from Nalbari district hospital, 4 from Karimganj district hospital, 3 from SMCH and 2 from DMCH were reported recovered from the disease and were also discharged from the hospital.
- On 7 June, 208 more persons tested positive for coronavirus in Assam, taking the state tally to 2,681. The same day 48 patients, 13 from SMCH, 12 from Nagaon hospital, 5 from Hailakandi hospital, 4 each from Morigaon hospital & DMCH, 2 each from Udalguri hospital, Singimari hospital, FAAMCH & JMCH and 1 each from MMCH & AMCH were reported recovered from the disease and were also discharged from the hospital.
- On 8 June, 154 more persons tested positive for coronavirus in Assam, taking the state tally to 2,835. The same day 148 patients, 45 from Golaghat hospital, 26 from JMCH, 17 from Kalapahar hospital, 15 from FAAMCH, 10 from Kokrajhar hospital, 9 from TMCH, and 6 from Tinsukia hospital, 4 patients each from GMCH, SMCH & MMCH, 3 from Karimganj hospital, 2 each from DMCH & Bongaigaon hospital and 1 from Dhemaji hospital were reported recovered from the disease and were also discharged from the hospital. The same day, Assam reported its 5th death in Karbi Anglong.
- On 9 June, 215 more persons tested positive for coronavirus in Assam, taking the state tally to 3,050. The same day 313 patients were reported recovered from the disease and were also discharged from the hospital.
- On 10 June, 235 more persons tested positive for coronavirus in Assam, taking the state tally to 3,285. The same day 152 patients were reported recovered from the disease and were also discharged from the hospital. Assam also reported its sixth death due to COVID-19 the same day.
- On 11 June, 145 more persons tested positive for coronavirus in Assam, taking the state tally to 3,430. The same day 183 patients were reported recovered from the disease and were also discharged from different hospitals.
- On 12 June, 263 more persons tested positive for coronavirus in Assam, taking the state tally to 3,693. The same day 152 patients were reported recovered from the disease and were also discharged from different hospitals. Assam also reported two deaths, taking the total death toll to 8.
- On 13 June, 207 more persons tested positive for coronavirus in Assam, taking the state tally to 3,900. The same day 221 patients were reported recovered from the disease and were also discharged from different hospitals.
- On 14 June, 218 more persons tested positive for coronavirus in Assam, taking the state tally to 4,118. The same day 155 patients were reported recovered from the disease and were also discharged from different hospitals.
- On 15 June, 191 more persons tested positive for coronavirus in Assam, taking the state tally to 4,309. The same day 245 patients were reported recovered from the disease and were also discharged from different hospitals.
- On 16 June, 201 more persons tested positive for coronavirus in Assam, taking the state tally to 4,510. The same day 206 patients were reported recovered from the disease and were also discharged from different hospitals.
- On 17 June, 184 more persons tested positive for coronavirus in Assam, taking the state tally to 4,694. The same day 231 patients were reported recovered from the disease and were also discharged from different hospitals.
- On 18 June, Assam reported its ninth COVID-19 death while the total cases rises to 4,904. The same day 194 patients were reported recovered from the disease and were also discharged from different hospitals.
- On 19 June, 102 more persons tested positive for coronavirus in Assam, taking the state tally to 5,006. The same day 218 patients were reported recovered from the disease and were also discharged from different hospitals.
- On 20 June, 249 more persons tested positive for coronavirus in Assam, taking the state tally to 5,255. The same day 136 patients were reported recovered from the disease and were also discharged from different hospitals.
- On 21 June, 331 more persons tested positive for coronavirus in Assam, taking the state tally to 5,586. The same day 202 patients were reported recovered from the disease and were also discharged from different hospitals.
- On 22 June, 267 more persons tested positive for coronavirus in Assam, taking the state tally to 5,853. The ruling BJP MLA Krishnendu Paul was among those who tested positive for coronavirus. The same day 161 patients were reported recovered from the disease and were also discharged from different hospitals.
- On 23 June, 203 more persons tested positive for coronavirus in Assam, taking the state tally to 6,056. The same day 197 patients were reported recovered from the disease and were also discharged from different hospitals.
- On 24 June, 314 more persons tested positive for coronavirus in Assam, taking the state tally to 6,370. The same day 196 patients were reported recovered from the disease and were also discharged from different hospitals.
- On 25 June, 276 more persons tested positive for coronavirus in Assam, taking the state tally to 6,646. The same day 75 patients were reported recovered from the disease and were also discharged from different hospitals.
- On 26 June, 273 more persons tested positive for coronavirus in Assam, taking the state tally to 6,919. The same day 214 patients were reported recovered from the disease and were also discharged from different hospitals.
- On 27 June, the state reported its 10th COVID-19 death and 246 more persons tested positive for coronavirus, taking the state tally to 7,165. The same day 567 patients were reported recovered from the disease and were also discharged from different hospitals.
- On 28 June, the state reported one more COVID-19 death, taking the total death toll to 11. The state also reported 327 COVID-19 positive cases, taking total tally to 7,492. Moreover, 274 patients were also reported recovered from the disease and were also discharged from different hospitals.
- On 29 June, 302 more persons tested positive for coronavirus in Assam, taking the state tally to 7,794. The same day 245 patients were reported recovered from the disease and were also discharged from different hospitals.
- On 30 June, the state reported one more COVID-19 death, taking the total death toll to 12. The state also reported 613 COVID-19 positive cases, taking total tally to 8,407. Moreover, 314 patients were also reported recovered from the disease and were also discharged from different hospitals.

=== July 2020 ===
Major events of COVID-19 pandemic in July
4 July	10,000 confirmed cases
11 July	10,000 reported recoveries
11 July	Announced extension of lockdown in Guwahati till 19 July
16 July	50 reported deaths
16 July	20,000 confirmed cases
23 July	20,000 reported recoveries
25 July	30,000 confirmed cases
31 July	40,000 confirmed cases
31 July	30,000 reported recoveries

- On 1 July, 548 more persons tested positive for coronavirus in Assam, taking the state tally to 8,955. The same day 184 patients were reported recovered from the disease and were also discharged from different hospitals.
- On 2 July, the state reported two more COVID-19 deaths, taking the total death toll to 14. The state also reported 479 COVID-19 positive cases, taking total tally to 9,434. Moreover, 275 patients were also reported recovered from the disease and were also discharged from different hospitals.
- On 3 July, 365 more persons tested positive for coronavirus in Assam, taking the state tally to 9,799. The same day 221 patients were reported recovered from the disease and were also discharged from different hospitals.
- On 4 July, total number of cases in Assam crossed 10,000 mark. 1,202 more persons tested positive for coronavirus, taking the state tally to 11,001. The same day 416 patients were reported recovered from the disease and were also discharged from different hospitals.
- On 5 July, 735 more persons tested positive for coronavirus in Assam, out of which 552 from Guwahati alone, taking the state tally to 11,736. The same day 690 patients were reported recovered from the disease and were also discharged from different hospitals.
- On 6 July, 786 more persons tested positive for coronavirus in Assam, out of which 598 from Guwahati alone, taking the state tally to 12,522. The same day 449 patients were reported recovered from the disease and were also discharged from different hospitals.
- On 7 July, the state reported two more COVID-19 deaths, taking the total death toll to 16. The state also reported 814 COVID-19 positive cases, out of which 588 from Guwahati alone, taking total tally to 13,336. Moreover, 447 patients were also reported recovered from the disease and were also discharged from different hospitals.
- On 8 July, the state reported six more COVID-19 deaths, taking the total death toll to 22. The state also reported 696 COVID-19 positive cases, out of which 423 from Guwahati alone, taking total tally to 14,032. Moreover, 397 patients were also reported recovered from the disease and were also discharged from different hospitals.
- On 9 July, the state reported five more COVID-19 deaths, taking the total death toll to 27. The state also reported 568 COVID-19 positive cases, out of which 355 from Guwahati alone, taking total tally to 14,600. Moreover, 421 patients were also reported recovered from the disease and were also discharged from different hospitals.
- On 10 July, the state reported eight more COVID-19 deaths, taking the total death toll to 35. The state also reported 936 COVID-19 positive cases, out of which 521 from Guwahati alone, taking total tally to 15,536. Moreover, 701 patients were also reported recovered from the disease and were also discharged from different hospitals.
- On 11 July, the state reported 535 COVID-19 positive cases, out of which 410 from Guwahati alone, taking total tally to 16,071. Moreover, 578 patients were also reported recovered from the disease and were also discharged from different hospitals.
- On 12 July, the state reported 735 COVID-19 positive cases, out of which 400 from Guwahati alone, taking total tally to 16,806. Moreover, 468 patients were also reported recovered from the disease and were also discharged from different hospitals.
- On 13 July, the state reported four more COVID-19 deaths, taking the total death toll to 40. The state also reported 1001 COVID-19 positive cases, out of which 513 from Guwahati alone, taking total tally to 17,807. Moreover, 522 patients were also reported recovered from the disease and were also discharged from different hospitals.
- On 14 July, the state reported six more COVID-19 deaths, taking the total death toll to 46. The state also reported 859 COVID-19 positive cases, out of which 627 from Guwahati alone, taking total tally to 18,666. Moreover, 757 patients were also reported recovered from the disease and were also discharged from different hospitals.
- On 15 July, the state reported two more COVID-19 deaths, taking the total death toll to 48. The state also reported 1088 COVID-19 positive cases, out of which 649 from Guwahati alone, taking total tally to 19,754. Moreover, 715 patients were also reported recovered from the disease and were also discharged from different hospitals.
- On 16 July, the state reported two more COVID-19 deaths, taking the total death toll to 50. The state also reported 892 COVID-19 positive cases, out of which 598 from Guwahati alone, taking total tally to 20,646. Moreover, 666 patients were also reported recovered from the disease and were also discharged from different hospitals.
- On 17 July, the state reported one more COVID-19 death, taking the total death toll to 51. The state also reported 1,218 COVID-19 positive cases, out of which 570 from Guwahati alone, taking total tally to 21,864. Moreover, 551 patients were also reported recovered from the disease and were also discharged from different hospitals.
- On 18 July, the state reported two more COVID-19 death, taking the total death toll to 53. The state also reported 1,117 COVID-19 positive cases, out of which 515 from Guwahati alone, taking total tally to 22,981. Moreover, 1,060 patients were also reported recovered from the disease and were also discharged from different hospitals.
- On 19 July, the state reported four more COVID-19 death, taking the total death toll to 57. The state also reported 1,018 COVID-19 positive cases, out of which 577 from Guwahati alone, taking total tally to 23,999. Moreover, 858 patients were also reported recovered from the disease and were also discharged from different hospitals.
- On 20 July, the state reported one more COVID-19 death, taking the total death toll to 58. The state also reported 1,093 COVID-19 positive cases, out of which 448 from Guwahati alone, taking total tally to 25,092. Moreover, 1,072 patients were also reported recovered from the disease and were also discharged from different hospitals.
- On 21 July, the state reported six more COVID-19 death, taking the total death toll to 64. The state also reported 1,680 COVID-19 positive cases, out of which 570 from Guwahati alone, taking total tally to 26,772. Moreover, 938 patients were also reported recovered from the disease and were also discharged from different hospitals.
- On 22 July, the state reported two more COVID-19 death, taking the total death toll to 66. The state also reported 972 COVID-19 positive cases, out of which 354 from Guwahati alone, taking total tally to 27,744. Moreover, 1,317 patients were also reported recovered from the disease and were also discharged from different hospitals.
- On 23 July, the state reported four more COVID-19 deaths, taking the total death toll to 70. The state also reported 1,047 COVID-19 positive cases, taking total tally to 28,791. Moreover, 1,349 patients were also reported recovered from the disease and were also discharged from different hospitals.
- On 24 July, the state reported six more COVID-19 deaths, taking the total death toll to 76. The state also reported 1,130 COVID-19 positive cases, taking total tally to 29,921. Moreover, 1,062 patients were also reported recovered from the disease and were also discharged from different hospitals.
- On 25 July, the state reported one more COVID-19 deaths, taking the total death toll to 77. The state also reported 1,165 COVID-19 positive cases, taking total tally to 31,086. Moreover, 1,294 patients were also reported recovered from the disease and were also discharged from different hospitals.
- On 26 July, the state reported two more COVID-19 deaths, taking the total death toll to 79. The state also reported 1,142 COVID-19 positive cases, taking total tally to 32,228. Moreover, 985 patients were also reported recovered from the disease and were also discharged from different hospitals.
- On 27 July, the state reported seven more COVID-19 deaths, taking the total death toll to 86. The state also reported 1,348 COVID-19 positive cases, taking total tally to 33,576. Moreover, 1,362 patients were also reported recovered from the disease and were also discharged from different hospitals.
- On 28 July, the state reported two more COVID-19 deaths, taking the total death toll to 88. The state also reported 1,371 COVID-19 positive cases, taking total tally to 34,947. Moreover, 1,216 patients were also reported recovered from the disease and were also discharged from different hospitals.
- On 29 July, the state reported four more COVID-19 deaths, taking the total death toll to 92. The state also reported 1,348 COVID-19 positive cases, taking total tally to 36,295. Moreover, 1,214 patients were also reported recovered from the disease and were also discharged from different hospitals.
- On 30 July, the state reported two more COVID-19 deaths, taking the total death toll to 94. The state also reported 2,112 COVID-19 positive cases, taking the total tally to 38,407. Moreover, 1,248 patients were also reported recovered from the disease and were also discharged from different hospitals.
- On 31 July, the state reported four more COVID-19 deaths, taking the total death toll to 98. The state also reported 1,862 COVID-19 positive cases, taking the total tally to 40,269. Moreover, 1,277 patients were also reported recovered from the disease and were also discharged from different hospitals.

=== August 2020 ===
Major events of COVID-19 pandemic in August
1 August	100 reported deaths
5 August	50,000 confirmed cases
8 August	40,000 reported recoveries
10 August	60,000 confirmed cases
13 August	70,000 confirmed cases
14 August	50,000 reported recoveries
18 August	80,000 confirmed cases
19 August	60,000 reported recoveries

- On 1 August, the state reported three more COVID-19 deaths, taking the total death toll to 101. The state also reported 1,457 COVID-19 positive cases, taking the total tally to 41,726. Moreover, 1,085 patients were also reported recovered from the disease and were also discharged from different hospitals.
- On 2 August, the state reported four more COVID-19 deaths, taking the total death toll to 105. The state also reported 1,178 COVID-19 positive cases, taking the total tally to 42,904. Moreover, 942 patients were also reported recovered from the disease and were also discharged from different hospitals.
- On 3 August, the state reported four more COVID-19 deaths, taking the total death toll to 109. The state also reported 2,371 COVID-19 positive cases, taking the total tally to 45,275. Moreover, 1,044 patients were also reported recovered from the disease and were also discharged from different hospitals.
- On 4 August, the state reported six more COVID-19 deaths, taking the total death toll to 115. The state also reported 2,886 COVID-19 positive cases, taking the total tally to 48,161. Moreover, 993 patients were also reported recovered from the disease and were also discharged from different hospitals.
- On 5 August, the state reported six more COVID-19 deaths, taking the total death toll to 121. The state also reported 2,284 COVID-19 positive cases, taking the total tally to 50,445. Moreover, 1,471 patients were also reported recovered from the disease and were also discharged from different hospitals.
- On 6 August, the state reported five more COVID-19 deaths, taking the total death toll to 126. The state also reported 2,372 COVID-19 positive cases, taking the total tally to 52,817. Moreover, 1,332 patients were also reported recovered from the disease and were also discharged from different hospitals.
- On 7 August, the state reported six more COVID-19 deaths, taking the total death toll to 132. The state also reported 2,679 COVID-19 positive cases, taking the total tally to 55,496. Moreover, 1,585 patients were also reported recovered from the disease and were also discharged from different hospitals.
- On 8 August, the state reported eight more COVID-19 deaths, taking the total death toll to 140. The state also reported 2,218 COVID-19 positive cases, taking the total tally to 57,714. Moreover, 1,782 patients were also reported recovered from the disease and were also discharged from different hospitals.
- On 9 August, the state reported five more COVID-19 deaths, taking the total death toll to 145. The state also reported 1,123 COVID-19 positive cases, taking the total tally to 58,837. Moreover, 1,734 patients were also reported recovered from the disease and were also discharged from different hospitals.
- On 10 August, the state reported six more COVID-19 deaths, taking the total death toll to 151. The state also reported 2,900 COVID-19 positive cases, taking the total tally to 61,737. Moreover, 1,261 patients were also reported recovered from the disease and were also discharged from different hospitals.
- On 11 August, the state reported four more COVID-19 deaths, taking the total death toll to 155. The state also reported 2,669 COVID-19 positive cases, taking the total tally to 64,406. Moreover, 1,487 patients were also reported recovered from the disease and were also discharged from different hospitals.
- On 12 August, the state reported six more COVID-19 deaths, taking the total death toll to 161. The state also reported 4,593 COVID-19 positive cases, the highest single-day spike, taking the total tally to 68,999. Moreover, 2,136 patients were also reported recovered from the disease and were also discharged from different hospitals.
- On 13 August, the state reported eight more COVID-19 deaths, taking the total death toll to 169. The state also reported 2,796 COVID-19 positive cases, taking the total tally to 71,795. Moreover, 2,174 patients were also reported recovered from the disease and were also discharged from different hospitals.
- On 14 August, the state reported six more COVID-19 deaths, taking the total death toll to 175. The state also reported 2,706 COVID-19 positive cases, taking the total tally to 74,501. Moreover, 2,310 patients were also reported recovered from the disease and were also discharged from different hospitals.
- On 15 August, the state reported seven more COVID-19 deaths, taking the total death toll to 182. The state also reported 1,057 COVID-19 positive cases, taking the total tally to 75,558. Moreover, 1,593 patients were also reported recovered from the disease and were also discharged from different hospitals.
- On 16 August, the state reported seven more COVID-19 deaths, taking the total death toll to 189. The state also reported 1,317 COVID-19 positive cases, taking the total tally to 76,875. Moreover, 1,929 patients were also reported recovered from the disease and were also discharged from different hospitals.
- On 17 August, the state reported eight more COVID-19 deaths, taking the total death toll to 197. The state also reported 2,792 COVID-19 positive cases, taking the total tally to 79,667. Moreover, 1,519 patients were also reported recovered from the disease and were also discharged from different hospitals.
- On 18 August, the state reported six more COVID-19 deaths, taking the total death toll to 203. The state also reported 2,534 COVID-19 positive cases, taking the total tally to 82,201. Moreover, 1,560 patients were also reported recovered from the disease and were also discharged from different hospitals.
- On 19 August, the state reported 10 more COVID-19 deaths, the highest single-day fatalities recorded, taking the total death toll to 213. The state also reported 2,116 COVID-19 positive cases, taking the total tally to 84,317. Moreover, 2,054 patients were also reported recovered from the disease and were also discharged from different hospitals.
- On 29 August, total number of Covid cases in Assam crossed 100000 mark.

=== September ===
- As of 16 September, the total number of cases in Assam was 148969, including 29091 active cases, 119364 recoveries and 511 have died from the virus.
- As of 19 September, the total number of cases in Assam was 155453, including 29362 active cases, 125540 recoveries and 548 deaths.
- As of 21 September, the total number of cases was 159320, including 29609 active cases, 129130 recoveries and 578 deaths.

=== October 2020 ===
- As of 2 October, the total number of cases in Assam was 183812, including 34128 active cases, 148960 recoveries and 721 have died from the virus.
- As of 6 October, the total number of cases in Assam was 188902, including 33047 active cases, 155074 recoveries and 778 have died.
- On 17 October, total number of cases in Assam crossed grim milestone of 200000 mark.
- As of 19 October, the total number of cases was 201404, including 27319 active cases, 173210 recoveries and 875 have died.
- As of 27 October, the total number of cases was 204789, including 12845 active cases, 191027 recoveries and 914 have died.

=== November 2020 ===
- As of 1 November, the total number of cases in Assam was 206514, including 8802 active cases, 196781 recoveries and 931 have died from the virus.
- As of 8 November, the total number of cases was 208786, including 6511 active cases, 201331 recoveries and 944 have died.
- As of 23 November, the total number of cases was 211679, including 3179 active cases, 207525 recoveries and 975 have died.

=== December 2020 ===
- As of 3 December, the total number of cases in Assam was 213168, including 3519 active cases, 208666 recoveries and 983 have died from the virus.
- As of 5 December, the total number of cases was 213659, including 3543 active cases, 209127 recoveries and 989 have died.
- As of 13 December, the total number of cases was 214654, including 3481 active cases, 210171 recoveries and 1002 have died.
- As of 17 December, the total number of cases was 215148, including 3623 active cases, 210612 recoveries and 1010 have died.
- As of 23 December, the total number of cases was 215677, including 3470 active cases, 211178 recoveries and 1029 have died.
- As of 28 December, the total number of cases was 215994, including 3323 active cases, 211633 recoveries and 1038 have died.
- As of 31 December, the total number of cases was 216208, including 3256 active cases, 211907 recoveries and 1045 deaths.

=== January 2021 ===
- As of 3 January, the total number of cases in Assam was 216304, including 3123 active cases, 212129 recoveries and 1052 have died from the virus.
- As of 14 January, the total number of cases was 215412, including 1644 active cases, 212703 recoveries and 1065 have died from the virus.
- As of 18 January, the total number of cases was 215514, including 1454 active cases, 212995 recoveries and 1075 fatalities.
- As of 19 January, the total number of cases was 215540, including 1384 active cases, 213081 cures and 1075 have died from the virus.
- As of 21 January, the total number of cases was 215593, including 1221 active cases, 213295 recoveries and 1077 deaths.
- As of 28 January, the total number of cases was 215724, including 691 active cases, 213952 recoveries and 1081 deaths.

=== February 2021 ===
- As of 1 February, the total number of cases in Assam was 217154, including 476 active cases, 212901 recoveries and 1083 have died from the virus.
- As of 10 February, the total number of cases was 217267, including 327 active cases, 214507 recoveries and 1086 have died.
- As of 16 February, the total number of cases was 217309, including 258 active cases, 214615 cures and 1089 fatalities.
- As of 20 February, the total number of cases was 216036, including 269 active cases, 214676 recoveries and 1091 deaths.

=== March 2021 ===
- As of 6 March, the total number of cases in Assam was 217649, including 278 active cases, 214930 recoveries and 1094 have died from the virus.
- As of 15 March, the total number of cases was 217797, including 272 active cases, 215080 recoveries and 1098 have died.
- As of 29 March, the total number of cases was 218310, including 469 active cases, 215390 cures and 1104 deaths.

=== April 2021 ===
- As of 1 April, the total number of cases in Assam was 218470, including 537 active cases, 215479 recoveries and 1107 have died from the virus.
- As of 4 April, the total number of cases was 215597, including 617 active cases, 215479 cures and 1109 have died from the virus.
- As of 8 April, the total number of cases was 217925, including 1023 active cases, 215790 recoveries and 1112 have died.
- As of 20 April, the total number of cases was 226326, including 7685 active cases, 217296 recoveries and 1145 deaths.

=== May 2021 ===
- As of 5 May, the total number of cases in Assam was 272751, including 29915 active cases, 240004 recoveries and 1485 have died from the virus.
- As of 18 May, the total number of cases in Assam was 339511, including 46393 active cases, 290774 recoveries and 2344 have died.
- As of 25 May, the total number of cases is 379824, including 53541 active cases, 323368 recoveries and 2915 have died.

=== June 2021 ===
- As of 17 June, the total number of cases in Assam was 473453, including 36793 active cases, 431208 recoveries and 4105 have died.
- As of 25 June, the total number of cases was 496481, including 28457 active cases, 462307 recoveries and 4370 deaths.

=== July 2021 ===
- As of 13 July, the total number of cases in Assam was 536238, including 19594 active cases, 510432 recoveries and 4865 deaths.
- As of 19 July, the total number of cases is 547283, including 16468 active cases, 524469 cures and 4999 deaths.

=== August 2021 ===
- As of 28 August, the total number of cases in Assam was 588025, including 6087 active cases, 574955 cures and 5636 deaths.

=== September 2021 ===
- As of 23 September, the total number of cases in Assam was 599271, including 3533 active cases, 588574 cures and 5817 fatalities.
- As of 26 September, the total number of cases was 600423, including 3314 active cases, 589924 cures and 5838 deaths.
- As of 28 September, the total number of cases was 601421, including 3288 active cases, 589961 recoveries and 5861 deaths.

=== Oct to Dec 2021 ===
- As of 8 October, the total number of cases in Assam was 604536, including 2767 active cases, 594506 cures and 5916 deaths.
- As of 23 October, the total number of cases was 608450, including 2621 active cases, 598515 cures and 5967 deaths.
- As of 20 November, the total number of cases is 610645, including 2327 active cases, 600974 recoveries and 5997 deaths.
- As of 4 December, the total number of cases is 617306, including 2480 active cases, 608713 recoveries and 6113 deaths.
- As of 29 December, the total number of cases is 620357, including 2138 active cases, 612059 recoveries and 6160 deaths.

=== Jan to Mar 2022 ===
- As of 10 January, the total number of cases in Assam was 626741, including 6434 active cases, 614126 cures and 6181 deaths.
- As of 11 February, the total number of cases was 723244, including 5363 active cases, 711285 recoveries and 6596 fatal cases.
- As of 21 February, the total number of cases was 723977, including 1833 active cases, 715511 recoveries and 6633 deaths.
- As of 1 March, the total number of cases was 724135, including 1515 active cases, 715982 recoveries and 6638 deaths.
- As of 19 March, the total number of cases was 724185, including 1365 active cases, 716181 cures and 6639 deaths.

=== April to June 2022 ===
- As on 13 April, total number of cases in Assam was 724200, including 1351 active cases, 716210 cures and 6639 deaths.
- As on 25 April, total number of cases was 724207, including 9 active cases, 716212 recoveries and 7986 deaths.
- As on 2 May, total number of cases was 724213, including 10 active cases, 716217 cures and 7986 deaths.
- As on 12 May, total number of cases was 724220, including 5 active cases, 716229 cures and 7986 fatal cases.
- As on 28 May, total number of cases was 724227, including 4 active cases, 716237 cures and 7986 deaths.
- As on 12 June, total number of cases was 724252, including 20 active cases, 716246 recoveries and 7986 deaths.
- As on 20 June, total number of cases was 724374, including 128 active cases, 716258 recoveries and 7988 deaths.
- As on 20 June, total number of cases was 724647, including 306 active cases, 716353 recoveries and 7988 fatalities.

=== July to September 2022 ===
- As on 16 July, total number of cases in Assam was 729994, including 3896 active cases, 718101 cures and 7997 deaths.
- As on 30 August, total number of cases was 744216, including 3037 active cases, 733149 recoveries and 8030 deaths.
- As on 7 September, total number of cases was 744804, including 2805 active cases, 733969 recoveries and 8033 fatal cases.
- As on 18 September, total number of cases was 745283, including 2811 active cases, 734441 recoveries and 8034 fatal cases.

== Timeline - overview ==
Weekly timeline of COVID-19 cases, recoveries and deaths in Assam
Dates	Positive cases	Recoveries	Deaths	Active cases
31 Mar - 6 Apr	▲26	Steady	Steady	▲26
7 Apr - 13 Apr	▲5	Steady	▲1	▲4
14 Apr - 20 Apr	▲3	▲19	Steady	▼16
21 Apr - 27 Apr	▲1	▲8	Steady	▼7
28 Apr - 4 May	▲7	▲5	Steady	▲2
5 May - 11 May	▲22	▲7	▲1	▲14
12 May - 18 May	▲51	▲4	▲2	▲45
19 May - 25 May	▲433	▲22	Steady	▲411
26 May - 1 Jun	▲937	▲222	Steady	▲715
2 Jun - 8 Jun	▲1350	▲500	▲1	▲849
9 Jun - 15 Jun	▲1474	▲1421	▲3	▲50
16 Jun - 22 Jun	▲1544	▲1360	▲1	▲183
23 Jun - 29 Jun	▲1941	▲1768	▲2	▲171
30 Jun - 6 Jul	▲4728	▲2608	▲3	▲2117
7 Jul - 13 Jul	▲5285	▲3475	▲26	▲1784
14 Jul - 20 Jul	▲7285	▲5679	▲18	▲1588
21 Jul - 27 Jul	▲8484	▲8307	▲28	▲149
28 Jul - 3 Aug	▲11699	▲8026	▲23	▲3650
4 Aug - 10 Aug	▲16462	▲10158	▲42	▲6262
11 Aug - 17 Aug	▲17930	▲13148	▲46	▲4736
18 Aug - 25 Aug	▲12952	▲14796	▲55	▲1622

== See also ==
- 2020 Tablighi Jamaat coronavirus hotspot in Delhi
- COVID-19 pandemic in India
- COVID-19 pandemic in Bihar
- COVID-19 pandemic in Delhi
- COVID-19 pandemic in Goa
- COVID-19 pandemic in Gujarat
- COVID-19 pandemic in Haryana
- COVID-19 pandemic in Karnataka
- COVID-19 pandemic in Kerala
- COVID-19 pandemic in Madhya Pradesh
- COVID-19 pandemic in Maharashtra
- COVID-19 pandemic in Punjab
- COVID-19 pandemic in Rajasthan
- COVID-19 pandemic in Tamil Nadu
- COVID-19 pandemic in Telangana
- COVID-19 pandemic in Uttar Pradesh
- COVID-19 pandemic in Uttarakhand
- COVID-19 pandemic in West Bengal
