= Nagaon Medical College and Hospital =

Indian medical college

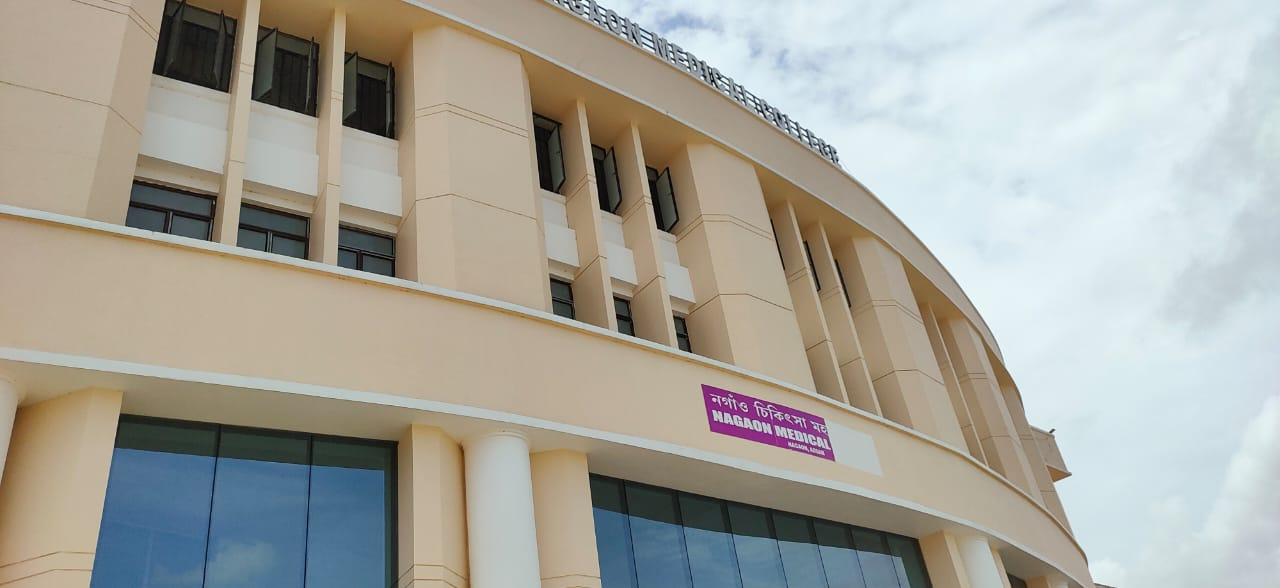
- Nagaon medical college front view
- Type: Public medical school
- Established: 2023 (3 years ago)
- Affiliations: Srimanta Sankaradeva University of Health Sciences; NMC
- Principal: Dr. Bishnu Ram Das
- Undergraduates: 100
- Location: Diphalu, Mohkhuli, Nagaon, Assam, India; 26.3666°N 92.7144°E
- Campus: Sub Urban
- Website: nagaonmch.assam.gov.in

Nagaon Medical College and Hospital is an Indian medical college with an attached hospital located in Nagaon, Assam, that started functioning in 2023.

== Background ==
The college operates under the State Ministry of Health and Family Welfare, Assam. It is permitted by National Medical Commission and affiliated with Srimanta Sankaradeva University of Health Sciences, Guwahati. Currently the college has an intact capacity of 100 undergraduate students, from the academic year 2023–24.

On 14 April 2023, Prime Minister Narendra Modi inaugurated the college and Hospital, along with All India Institute of Medical Sciences, Guwahati and two other medical colleges.

== Location ==
Nagaon Medical College is situated in Laukhowa Road, Diphalu, Mohkhuli, Nagaon, Assam. Nagaon is well connected to the rest of the Assam through Roads and is situated 120 km from Guwahati.
