= Kokrajhar Medical College and Hospital =

Indian medical college

Coordinates: 26.4643°N 90.2824°E

- Motto: सर्वे सन्तु निरामयाः
- Type: Medical college
- Established: 2023 (3 years ago)
- Affiliations: Srimanta Sankaradeva University of Health Sciences; NMC
- Principal: Dr. Atul Chandra Baro
- Undergraduates: 100
- Location: Rangalikhata, Kokrajhar, Bodoland Territorial Region, Assam, India
- Campus: Sub Urban
- Website: kokrajharmch.assam.gov.in

Kokrajhar Medical College and Hospital (KMCH) is a government-run medical college cum hospital located in Rangalikhata, Kokrajhar, Assam. The college started functioning in 2023 with approval from the National Medical Commission. It is only the government-run medical college in the Bodoland Territorial Region headquarter, Kokrajhar district.

== History ==
The college operates under the State Ministry of Health and Family Welfare, Assam. It is recognised by the National Medical Commission and affiliated with Srimanta Sankaradeva University of Health Sciences, Guwahati. Currently the college has an intact capacity of 100 undergraduate students, from the academic year 2021–22.

On 14 April 2023, Prime Minister Narendra Modi inaugurated the college and hospital, along with the All India Institute of Medical Sciences, Guwahati and two other medical colleges.
