= Tezpur Medical College and Hospital =

Medical college in Tezpur, Assam

- Motto: सर्वे सन्तु निरामया
- Motto in English: "Let every being be free from sorrow and fear"
- Type: Government
- Established: 2013 (13 years ago)
- Affiliations: Srimanta Sankaradeva University of Health Sciences, NMC
- Principal: Dr. Karuna Hazarika (MD, DMRD)
- Faculty: 120
- Undergraduates: 125 per year (MBBS)
- Location: Bihaguri, NH-52 Tezpur, Assam, India, Tezpur, India; 26.6802778°N 92.6533333°E
- Website: tezpur-mch.assam.gov.in

Tezpur Medical College and Hospital (TMCH) is a medical college based in Tezpur, Assam, India established in 2013. This college is the 6th medical college of the State Government for the promotion of medical education in the state and counter the deficit to some extent. The college operates under the State Ministry of Health and Family Welfare, Assam.

TMCH offers undergraduate courses in Medicine and Surgery (MBBS) and postgraduate courses in various specialties including Anatomy, Physiology, Biochemistry, Pathology, Microbiology, Pharmacology, Forensic Medicine, General Medicine, and Community Medicine.

Central part, with OPD Department in the background

== Departments ==
- Emergency & Trauma
- Anatomy
- Physiology
- Biochemistry & Metabolic Medicine
- Pharmacology
- Pathology
- Microbiology
- Forensic Medicine
- Toxicology
- Community Medicine
- General medicine
- Pediatrics
- Pulmonary Medicine
- Dermatology
- Psychiatry
- General Surgery
- Orthopedics
- Obstetrics and Gynaecology
- Ophthalmology
- Otorhinolaryngology & Head and Neck Surgery
- Anaesthesiology & Critical Care
- Radiodiagnosis
- Dentistry

== TMC at a glance ==
Year of establishment at its permanent site	2013
Year of permission of MBBS course by MCI	2014
No. of students admitted annually in MBBS course	125
Current No. of students on Roll in MBBS course	550+
Total No. of Teaching Staff	120+
Total area of land (in acres) of the TMC Campus	12

== See also ==
- List of medical colleges in India
- Assam Medical College and Hospital (AMCH), Dibrugarh
- Gauhati Medical College and Hospital (GMCH), Guwahati
- Silchar Medical College and Hospital (SMCH), Silchar
