= Deepali Dutta =

- Born: 1929; Dumduma, Tinsukia
- Died: September 15, 2010
- Education: Post-graduation
- Medical career
- Institutions: Gauhati Medical College and Hospital, Assam Medical College, Silchar Medical College
- Sub-specialties: Psychiatry

Deepali Dutta (1929 – 15 September 2010) was an Indian psychiatrist from Assam and a pioneering figure in psychiatric medicine in Northeast India. She served as the President of the Indian Psychiatric Society. Dutta held key academic and administrative roles in medical education in Assam. She served as the Principal of Guwahati Medical College, Assam Medical College and Silchar Medical College and was the only woman to have served as Principal of Guwahati Medical College. She also held the post of Director of Medical Education, Assam.

== Early life and education ==
Deepali Dutta was raised in Doom Dooma, a town in the eastern region of Assam. Her father was Hem Borkakoti. She received her early education at Ballika Bidyalaya in Doomdooma and completed her matriculation before moving to Guwahati to attend Cotton College for her pre-university studies. After passing the P.U. examination, she joined Assam Medical College in 1953 to pursue an MBBS degree.

Following graduation, she briefly worked as a demonstrator in the Department of Pathology at Assam Medical College. In 1961, she was selected for higher studies in psychiatry in Edinburgh, United Kingdom, where she met a senior colleague who was pursuing an FRCS. She later obtained degrees such as MRCP, FRC PSYCHE etc. from different institutions. She served as the Principal of Assam Medical College from 1990 to 1992 and Guwahati Medical College from 1992 to 1993.

== Career ==
She served as Professor and Principal at Guwahati Medical College, Assam Medical College and Silchar Medical College. She was also appointed as the Director of Directorate of Medical Education, Assam. In 1990, Deepali Dutta held the position of President of the Indian Psychiatric Society. She also served as the chairman of Guwahati Mental Welfare Society.

== Legacy ==
The Department of Psychiatry of Guwahati Medical College has been organizing lectures in memory of Dipali Dutta every year to commemorate her contributions.
