= Medical Institute Jorhat =

Medical Institute, Jorhat
- Type: Medical college
- Established: 12 October 2009
- Affiliation: Srimanta Sankaradeva University of Health Sciences
- Principal: Prof. (Dr.) Saurabh Borkotoki
- Location: Jorhat, Assam, India
- Website: https://jorhatmedicalcollege.in/jmch/

Medical Institute, Jorhat (MIJ), is a medical institute located in Jorhat, Assam India.

The institute trains Rural Health Practitioners (RHPs), who serve as medical professionals in the rural areas at sub-centers and at the PHC level. RHPs are trained practitioners of the allopathic system of medicine.

The course offered by the institute is the Diploma in Medicine and Rural Health Care (DMRHC). The DMRHC is a 3 1/2-year medical course, now known as B.Sc. Community Health and Graduates of this course are designated as Community Health Officers (CHOs) and the CHOs are now practicing at sub-centers and PHCs in the various districts of Assam under National Health Mission (NHM) on a contractual basis. This course has now been replaced by a new course known as B.Sc. Family and Community Health and has been withdrawn from the institute.

== History ==
Prior to opening of MIJ, only three medical colleges existed: Assam Medical College (established on 3 November 1947), Gauhati Medical College (established on 20 September 1960), and Silchar Medical College (established on 15 August 1968). The government realized there was a shortage of doctors and it needed to be addressed. In 2005, Chief Minister Tarun Gogoi and Dr. Himanta Biswa Sarma, the Minister of Health and Family Welfare, decided to build three new medical colleges in Jorhat, Tezpur, and Barpeta.

Construction in Jorhat began on 1 June 2008. On 25 August 2008, the Prime Minister of India, Manmohan Singh, laid the foundation stone of the institute. On 12 October 2009, Tarun Gogoi inaugurated the hospital wing.
