= Nalbari Medical College and Hospital =

Indian medical college

Coordinates: 26.4130°N 91.5118°E

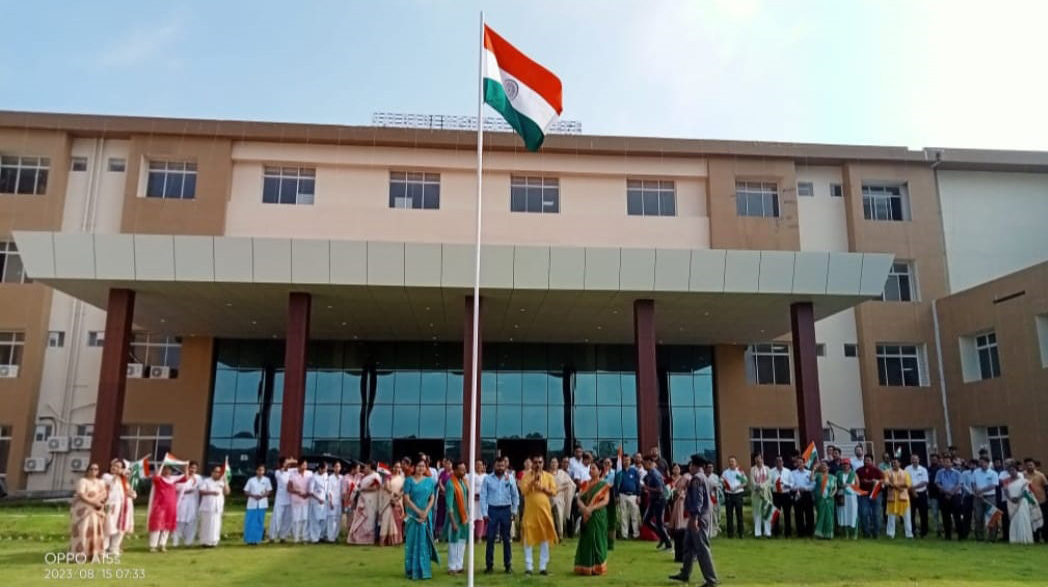
- Type: Medical college
- Established: April 14, 2023; 3 years ago
- Affiliations: Srimanta Sankaradeva University of Health Sciences; NMC
- Principal: Dr. Achyut Chandra Baishya
- Undergraduates: 100
- Location: Dakhingaon, Nalbari, Assam, India
- Campus: Sub Urban
- Website: nalbarimch.assam.gov.in

Nalbari Medical College and Hospital is an Indian medical college with an attached hospital located in Nalbari, Assam, that opened in 2023.

== Background ==
The college operates under the State Ministry of Health and Family Welfare, Assam. It is recognised by National Medical Commission and affiliated with Srimanta Sankaradeva University of Health Sciences, Guwahati. The college had an intact capacity of 100 undergraduate students in the academic year 2021–22.

On 14 April 2023, Prime Minister Narendra Modi inaugurated the college and Hospital, along with All India Institute of Medical Sciences, Guwahati and two other medical colleges.
