= Jorhat Medical College and Hospital =

Medical college in Jorhat, Assam

- Official Seal of Jorhat Medical College & Hospital
- Motto: सर्वे सन्तु निरामया
- Motto in English: "May no one Suffer in any way"
- Type: Public
- Established: 12 October 2009 (16 years ago)
- Affiliations: Srimanta Sankaradeva University of Health Sciences; NMC
- Principal: Dr. Saurabh Borkotoki
- Undergraduates: 125 per year
- Postgraduates: 45 per year
- Location: Jorhat, Assam, India; 26.7421°N 94.1960°E
- Website: jorhatmch.assam.gov.in

Jorhat Medical College & Hospital (JMCH) is a medical college and hospital based in Jorhat, Assam, India. It is the fourth medical college in the state and it caters to the healthcare needs of more than 1.2 million people of the entire Jorhat district, the neighbouring districts of Golaghat, Sivasagar and Majuli as well as the patients from the neighbouring states of Nagaland and Arunachal Pradesh. The college operates under the State Ministry of Health and Family Welfare, Assam.

== History ==
The foundation stone of the fourth medical college in Assam was laid by the then Prime Minister Dr. Manmohan Singh, on 25 August 2008. On 12 October 2009, the then Honourable Chief Minister of Assam, Tarun Gogoi, inaugurated the hospital wing of Jorhat Medical College. It is said to be the best in Assam in terms of infrastructure and patient load as it has shown a tremendous growth in output since its inauguration in 2009.

== Location and Transportation ==
Jorhat Medical College is situated about 3 km west of the heart of Jorhat city. College buses and auto-rickshaws are available for transportation to the college. Jorhat is well connected by road, rail and airways. Luxury (AC/Non-AC) day and night bus services are available from the capital city Guwahati, to Jorhat, and the journey takes about 6 hours. Jorhat Airport is located near the college and offers direct flights to Guwahati, Kolkata, and Delhi daily. Two major railway stations near the college are Jorhat Town Railway Station and Mariani Junction.

== Courses ==
UG:

- MBBS: Admission only through National Eligibility cum Entrance Test (Undergraduate)
- Bsc Allied Health Care Professional courses : Admission only through SSUHS Medical Technology (Paramedical) - Degree/ Diploma Entrance Examination
  - Bsc Anesthesia and Critical Care Technology
  - Bsc Blood bank Technology
  - Bsc Cardiac Care
  - Bsc Operation Theater Technology
  - Bachelor's in Optometry
  - Bsc ICU Technology
  - Bsc Radiography and Imaging technology
  - Bachelor's in Medical Lab Tech
  - Bsc Trauma and Emergency
  - Bsc Dialysis Technology
  - Bachelor's in Physiotherapy

PG:

- Allied Health Care PG Course: Admission only through SSUHS Postgraduate Degree Entrance Examination
  - Master's in Physiotherapy (Neurology and Psychosomatic Disorders)
  - Master's in Physiotherapy (Musculoskeletal Disorders and Sports)

== Departments ==
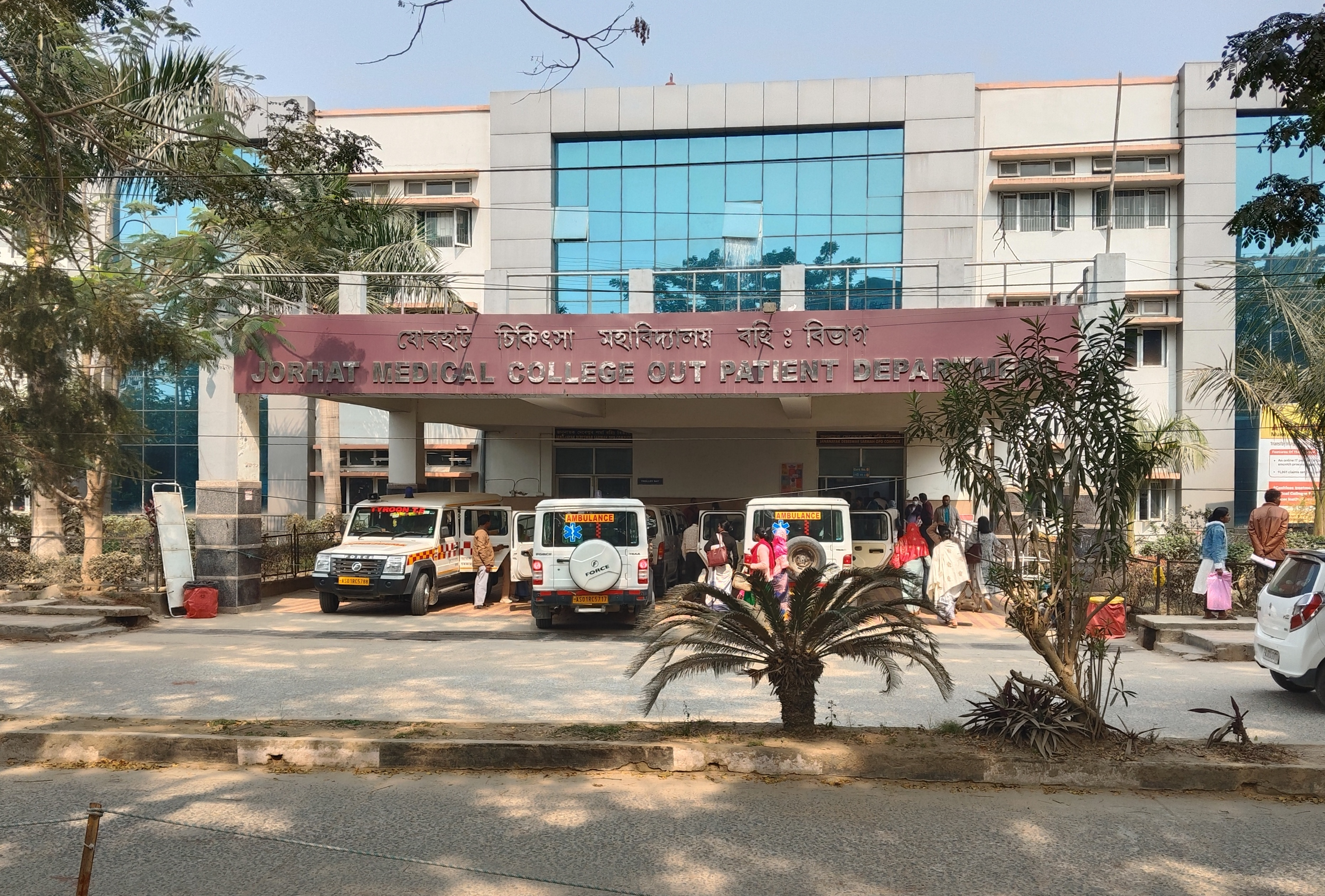
The OPD of Jorhat Medical College Hospital

- Anatomy
- Physiology
- Biochemistry
- Pathology
- Microbiology
- Pharmacology
- Community Medicine
- Medicine
- Cardiology
- TB & Chest
- Dermatology
- Psychiatry
- Pediatrics
- Surgery
- Neurosurgery
- Orthopedics
- ENT
- Ophthalmology
- O & G
- Radiology
- Anesthesiology
- Dentistry
- FSM

== See also ==
- List of medical colleges in India
- Assam Medical College and Hospital (AMCH), Dibrugarh
- Gauhati Medical College and Hospital (GMCH), Guwahati
- Silchar Medical College and Hospital (SMCH), Silchar
