= Changsari =

- Village
- Location in Assam, India Changsari (India)
- Coordinates: 26.28°N 91.7°E
- Country: India
- State: Assam
- District: Kamrup
- Elevation: 46 m (151 ft)

Languages
  - Official: Assamese
- Time zone: UTC+5:30 (IST)
- PIN: 781101
- Vehicle registration: AS 25
- Website: http://www.Kamrup.nic.in

Changsari is a village in the Kamrup district of Assam, situated on the north bank of the Brahmaputra River,North Guwahati. It is a coincidence that the AIIMS is located here.

== Education ==
Saraighat College is situated in Changsari along with primary and high schools. Notable institutes like the Central Institute of Petrochemicals Engineering and Technology, All India Institute of Medical Sciences, Guwahati, National Institute of Pharmaceutical Education and Research, Guwahati, and Dr. Bhupen Hazarika Regional Government Film and Television Institute are also situated here.

== Health care ==
With the existing health care facilities, the state government on 28 June 2016 handed over more than 571 acres of land at Changsari to the centre to set up the 750-bed super-speciality hospital, All India Institute of Medical Sciences, at an expenditure of around Rs 10 billion.

=== Controversy ===
Handing over the plot at Changsari to the centre triggered a series of protests at Raha in Central Assam and senior citizens of the area went on a hunger strike. The violent protests also witnessed the killing of one person in Raha on 15 July 2016.

The AIIMS Demand Committee of Raha filed a petition challenging the official move to set up the AIIMS at Changsari, which led The National Green Tribunal (NGT) of India to instruct halting of construction work temporarily. Committee and others alleged that construction in current site will have grave environmental hazards, huge natural wetland (Jalah Beel) will have to be completely filled up which may have grave consequences in future including abnormal flooding of the adjoining areas and the highways to support their point, which is thoroughly rejected by Engineers forum.

Engineers asserted that the Changsari site was selected by an expert committee constituted by the Union Government considering over thirty aspects and it cannot be dismissed as a non-feasible site. They said the expert committee examined the technical parameters, which included mandatory environmental impact assessment, accessibility, national and international connectivity, technical feasibility, comparative project cost analysis and existence of support infrastructure in the vicinity for the purpose of selecting the AIIMS site.

They claim that the Jalah Beel is not a water body covered under The Guwahati Water Bodies (Preservation, Conservation and Protection) Act, 2008 and hence allegation that AIIMS construction would violate the said Act, is not based on facts. This Act has specifically notified the following water bodies in the Schedule I to IV - the Sarusala, Borsola, Silsako and the Deepor beels and Bondajan was added as Schedule V in the amended Act 2010.

The permissible built-up construction in the area allotted to AIIMS is 50.92 per cent as per Table 14.2 of the notified Master Plan. The Building Construction Regulation Bye Laws 2014, restricts the ground coverage of such institutional buildings to 35 per cent as per clause 26 (1) (c). Therefore, the AIIMS construction would cover a maximum area of 35 per cent of the plot area and leave the balance 65 per cent as open space. The wetlands, hills, rivers, natural streams, forest constitute only 20.25 per cent of the plot area. Hence this area obviously need not be touched at all.

Only "notified water bodies" under Guwahati Water Bodies (Preservation, Conservation and Protection) Act, 2008 and 2010 and "designated hills" under the Assam Hill Land and Ecological Sites (Protection and Management) Act 2006, are prohibited areas under the law. The law allows for scientific and regulated development of other areas as per laid down engineering stipulations. Further, they say, patients and specialised doctors often need to be flown in at short notice in life-threatening situations. One can imagine the plight of a top level specialist or emergency patient being caught in water logging at Jorabat or in the numerous road blockades and bandhs en route to any other location in Upper or Middle Assam.

== Transportation ==
Changsari is on National Highway 31. Changsari railway station is used for both passenger and freight services. LGB International Airport is 26 km (16 mi) by road.
