= Dhubri Medical College and Hospital =

Medical college in Dhubri, Assam, India

Coordinates: 26.0353446°N 89.9647172°E

- Type: Government
- Established: 8 August 2022 (3 years ago)
- Affiliations: Srimanta Sankaradeva University of Health Sciences; NMC
- Principal: Dr. Anku Moni Saikia
- Undergraduates: 100
- Location: Jhagrarpar, Dhubri, Assam, 783325, India
- Campus: Sub Urban
- Website: dhubri-mch.assam.gov.in
- Location in Assam Dhubri Medical College and Hospital (India)

Dhubri Medical College and Hospital is a medical college with attached hospital located in Dhubri, Assam. This is the 9th medical college of the state. The college operates under the State Ministry of Health and Family Welfare, Assam. It is recognised by National Medical Commission and affiliated with Srimanta Sankaradeva University of Health Sciences, Guwahati. Currently the college has an intact capacity of 100 undergraduate students, from academic year 2022-23.
