= Tinsukia Medical College & Hospital =

Medical college in Tinsukia, Assam, India

Geography
- Location: Makum, Tinsukia district, Assam, India
- Coordinates: 27.4865°N 95.4358°E

Organisation
- Type: Teaching
- Affiliated university: Srimanta Sankaradeva University of Health Sciences; NMC

History
- Opened: 2024; 2 years ago

Links
- Website: tinsukiamch.assam.gov.in
- Lists: Hospitals in India

Tinsukia Medical College & Hospital is a medical college with an attached hospital located in Makum, Tinsukia district, Assam. It is the 13th medical college in the state. The college operates under the State Ministry of Health and Family Welfare, Assam. It is recognised by the National Medical Commission and affiliated with Srimanta Sankaradeva University of Health Sciences, Guwahati. As of the 2024–25 academic year, the college has a capacity of 100 undergraduate students.

== History ==
Government of Assam decided to construct a medical college and hospital at Makum in Tinsukia district. A project for the construction of Tinsukia Medical College and Hospital, along with related infrastructure, was approved for funding from the Assam Infrastructure Financing Authority, with an estimated project cost of Rs. 350 Crores. On 7 January 2019, Chief Minister Sarbananda Sonowal laid the foundation stone of the institute. The college was inaugurated on 9 March 2024, by Prime Minister Narendra Modi.

== Academics ==
Tinsukia Medical College & Hospital offers an undergraduate course in medicine, specifically the Bachelor of Medicine and Bachelor of Surgery (MBBS). The duration of the course is five and a half years, including one year of internship. The college has an annual intake of 100 students. Prof. (Dr.) Rupak Kumar Gogoi holds the position of the current and first Principal Cum Chief Superintendent of the institution. Prof. (Dr.) Purnima Barua held the position of the first Medical Superintendent of the hospital and the post is currently being held by Prof. (Dr.) Mukul Sarma. The motto of the institution is "Ethics, Empathy, Excellence".
