= Lakhimpur Medical College and Hospital =

Medical college in Assam

- Motto: सर्वे सन्तु निरामयाः
- Motto in English: May no one suffer from illness
- Type: Public medical school
- Established: 1 October 2021 (4 years ago)
- Affiliations: Srimanta Sankaradeva University of Health Sciences; National Medical Commission
- Principal: Dr. Pranjal Tahbildar
- Undergraduates: 100
- Location: Chowkham, Saboti, North Lakhimpur, Assam, 787051, India; 27.2609246°N 94.1048037°E
- Campus: Sub Urban
- Website: lakhimpur-mch.assam.gov.in

Lakhimpur Medical College and Hospital is a medical college with attached hospital located in North Lakhimpur, Assam. It started functioning from 1 October 2021. This is the 8th medical college of the state. The college operates under the State Ministry of Health and Family Welfare, Assam. It is recognised by National Medical Commission and affiliated with Srimanta Sankaradeva University of Health Sciences, Guwahati. Currently the college has an intact capacity of 100 undergraduate students, from academic year 2021-22.

Lakhimpur Medical College and Hospital offers an undergraduate course in medicine, namely Bachelor of Medicine and Bachelor of Surgery (MBBS). The duration of the course is five and a half years, including one year of internship. The college has an annual intake of 100 students.

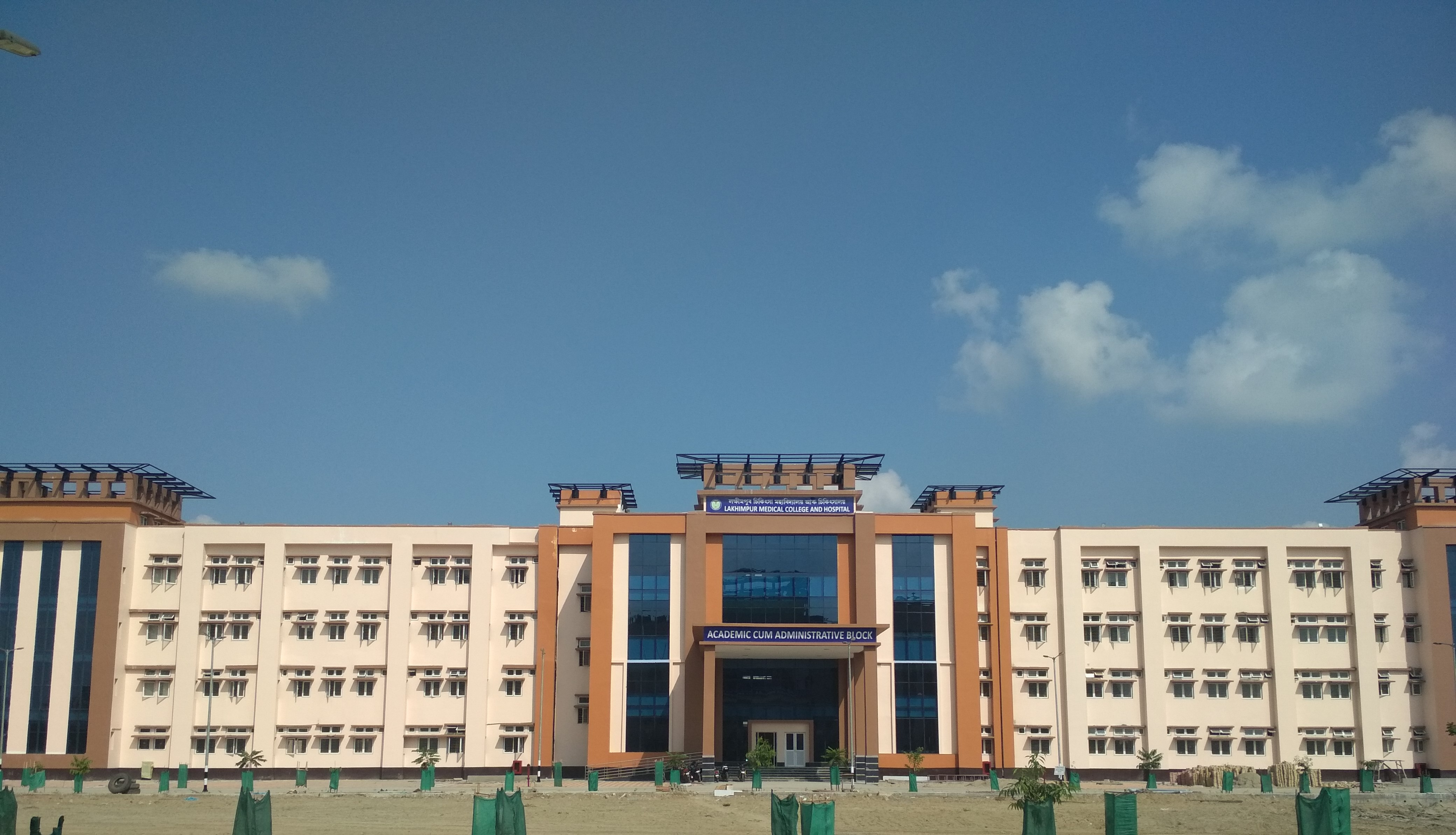
Lakhimpur Medical College Academic and Administrative building
