= Pragjyotishpur Medical College & Hospital =

Medical school in Assam, India

Pragjyotishpur Medical College and Hospital
- Type: Medical college
- Established: February 1, 2025; 16 months ago
- Affiliations: Srimanta Sankaradeva University of Health Sciences, NMC
- Principal: Dr. Basanta Kumar Baishya (acting)
- Undergraduates: 100
- Location: Guwahati, Kamrup district, Assam, India
- Campus: Urban

Pragjyotishpur Medical College and Hospital is the fourteenth government medical college of Assam located in Guwahati, Assam. The medical college became functional from 1 February 2025 with the commencement of outpatient department services. Currently the college has an intact capacity of 100 undergraduate students, from academic year 2025-26.
