= Barpeta Medical College and Hospital =

Medical college in Barpeta, Assam

Coordinates: 26.324°N 90.986°E

- Type: Public
- Established: 2011 (15 years ago)
- Affiliations: Srimanta Sankaradeva University of Health Sciences; NMC
- Principal: Dr. Ramen Talukdar
- Undergraduates: 125 (MBBS) per year
- Postgraduates: 42
- Location: Jotigaon, Barpeta, Assam, India
- Website: faamch.assam.gov.in

Barpeta Medical College and Hospital (BMCH), Formerly known as Fakruddin Ali Ahmed Medical College And Hospital is the fifth medical college of Assam based in Barpeta. The classes were formally inaugurated in August 2012 by then health minister of Assam, Himanta Biswa Sarma, after it received the permission from the National Medical Commission even though the hospital section was inaugurated on 11 February 2011.

It is affiliated with Srimanta Sankaradeva University of Health Sciences, Guwahati. The college has a current intake of 125 undergraduate students per year and 42 postgraduate students per year. The college also runs various paramedical diploma courses.

Barpeta Medical College and Hospital was originally established as Fakhruddin Ali Ahmed Medical College and Hospital, in the memory of India’s 5th President Fakhruddin Ali Ahmed who was from Assam. The Himanta Biswa Sarma government in the state, however, has decided to drop the name "Fakruddin Ali Ahmed", and rename the college as Barpeta Medical College and Hospital. The move sparked outrage after the Assam cabinet passed the proposal to rename the college on March 11, 2026.

== Departments ==
- Anaesthesiology
- Anatomy
- Biochemistry
- Community Medicine
- Dentistry
- Dermatology
- ENT
- Forensic Medicine
- Medicine
- Microbiology
- Obstetrics & Gynaecology
- Ophthalmology
- Orthopaedics
- Paediatrics
- Pathology
- Pharmacology
- Physiology
- Psychiatry
- Radiology
- Surgery
- TB & Chest

== XCLEPIA ==
Xclepia is the annual fest of Barpeta Medical College. It is held every year towards the end of first week of February and ends on 11 Feb which commemorates the Foundation Day of the college. Various sports, literary, cultural activities etc. are undertaken during the fest week by the students, staff and teachers of the college. Xclepia is named after Asclepius or Hepius, a hero and GOD of medicine in ancient Greek religion and mythology.
