= Srimanta Sankaradeva University of Health Sciences =

Health science university in Guwahati, Assam, India

- Type: Public
- Established: 2009; 17 years ago
- Chancellor: Chief Minister of Assam
- Vice-Chancellor: Dr. Anup Kumar Barman
- Administrative staff: 48
- Location: Guwahati, Assam, India
- Website: Official website

Srimanta Sankaradeva University of Health Sciences (SSUHS), Guwahati, Assam, India is established in 2009 as per The Srimanta Sankaradeva University of Health Sciences Act, 2007. The Srimanta Sankaradeva University of Health Sciences is the only Health Sciences University in the North Eastern Region with its jurisdiction to the whole of Assam. It has its jurisdiction over state of Assam.

== Academics ==
The university is an affiliating university and has jurisdiction all over Assam. It is also engaged in research work. Presently, there are 47 affiliated institutions under this university.

Affiliated colleges are:

{This is not a complete list of all institutes; only a few are mentioned.}

=== Research institutions ===
- Lokopriya Gopinath Bordoloi Regional Institute of Mental Health (LGBRIMH), Tezpur
- Dr. B. Borooah Cancer Institute, Guwahati

=== Medical colleges ===
- Assam Medical College, Dibrugarh
- Barpeta Medical College and Hospital, Barpeta
- Gauhati Medical College and Hospital, Guwahati
- Jorhat Medical College and Hospital, Jorhat
- Silchar Medical College and Hospital, Silchar
- Tezpur Medical College and Hospital, Sonitpur
- Diphu Medical College and Hospital, Diphu
- Lakhimpur Medical College and Hospital, North Lakhimpur
- Dhubri Medical College and Hospital, Dhubri
- Kokrajhar Medical College and Hospital, Kokrajhar
- Nagaon Medical College and Hospital, Nagaon
- Nalbari Medical College and Hospital, Nalbari
- Tinsukia Medical College & Hospital, Makum
- Pragjyotishpur Medical College & Hospital, Guwahati
- ESIC Medical College & Hospital, Beltola,Guwahati

=== Dental Colleges ===
- Regional Dental College, Guwahati
- Government Dental College, Dibrugarh
- Government Dental College, Silchar

=== Nursing Colleges (Govt Sector) ===
- Regional College of Nursing, Guwahati
- B.Sc. Nursing College, Silchar
- B.Sc. Nursing College, Dibrugarh
- Army Institute of Nursing, Guwahati

=== Pharmacy Colleges (Govt. Sector) ===
- Institute of Pharmacy, Silchar Medical College and Hospital
- Institute of Pharmacy, Gauhati Medical College and Hospital
- Institute of Pharmacy, Assam Medical College, Dibrugarh

=== Ayurvedic Colleges ===
- Government Ayurvedic College, Guwahati

=== Homeopathic College ===
- Assam Homeopathic College, Nagaon
- SJN Homoeopathic Medical College, Guwahati
- Dr. JKS Homoeopathic Medical College, Jorhat

=== Community Medical institute ===
- Medical Institute, Jorhat
