= All India Institute of Medical Sciences, Guwahati =

Medical school in Assam, India

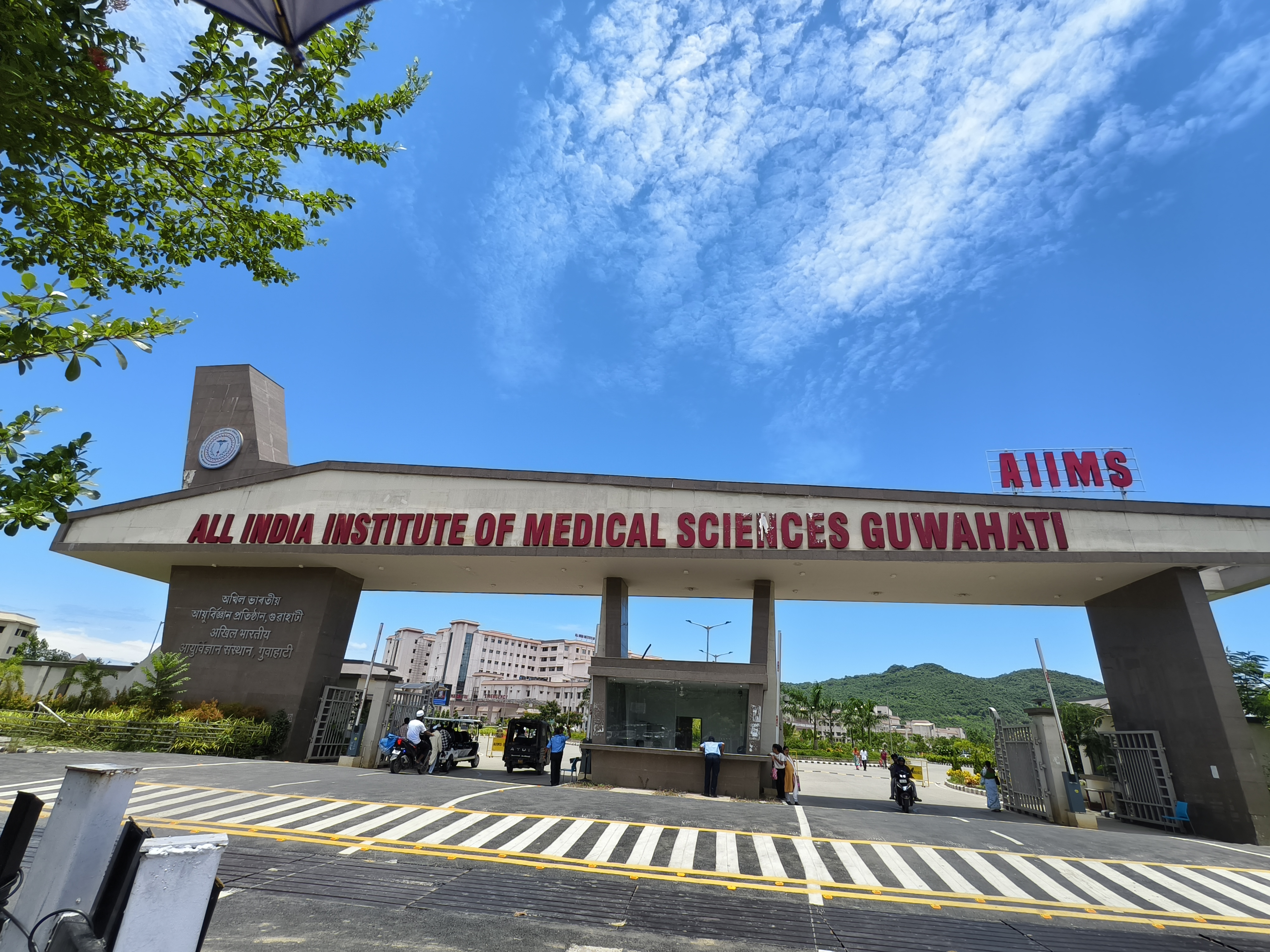
- Entrance arch of AIIMS, Guwahati
- Type: Public
- Established: January 12, 2020; 6 years ago
- President: Dr. Bhupendra Kumar Singh Sanjay
- Director: Dr. Ashok Puranik
- Students: 200
- Location: Changsari, Guwahati, Assam, India; 26.2523°N 91.6956°E
- Campus: Urban, 189 acres (76 ha)
- Website: aiimsguwahati.ac.in

All India Institute of Medical Sciences, Guwahati (AIIMS Guwahati) is a public medical institute and hospital based in Guwahati, Assam under Ministry of Health and Family Welfare, Government Of India, and one of the All India Institutes of Medical Sciences (AIIMSs). On 26 May 2017, Prime Minister Narendra Modi laid the foundation stone of the Institute. The institute was inaugurated on 14 April 2023 by Prime Minister Narendra Modi. The institute has an annual intake of 100 MBBS students. The academic activity for the first batch of 50 MBBS students started in January 2021.

== Academics ==
The academic programme for the first batch of MBBS students was inaugurated on 12 January 2021 by the then Honorable Union Minister for Health and Family Welfare Dr.Harsh Vardhan. The Institute became operational with 50 MBBS students, and is one of the four AIIMSs to become operational in academic year 2020-21. The Institute was initially functioning from a temporary campus at Narakasur Hilltop of Gauhati Medical College, with AIIMS Bhubaneswar mentoring it. The Institute has shifted to its permanent campus in March 2022. On 14 April 2023, Prime Minister Narendra Modi inaugurated AIIMS, Guwahati and three other medical colleges.

== Patient Services ==
The Institute will have a 750-bedded hospital with more than 25 specialty and super-specialty departments. This is apart from the outpatient services and the diagnostic services. There will also be a separate facility for providing services under AYUSH.
