= Silchar Medical College and Hospital =

- শিলচৰ চিকিৎসা মহাবিদ্যালয়
- Motto: সর্বে সন্তু নিৰাময়া
- Motto in English: May Everyone Be Disease Free
- Type: Government tertiary care hospital
- Established: August 1966; 60 years ago
- Affiliations: Srimanta Sankaradeva University of Health Sciences, NMC
- Principal: Dr. Abhijit Swami
- Undergraduates: 125 MBBS students
- Postgraduates: 122 MD/MS/Diploma students
- Location: Ghungoor, Silchar, Assam, 788014, India
- Campus: Suburban
- Language: Assamese, Bengali, English
- Acronym: SMC
- email id: smc-asm@nic.in
- Website: www.smcassam.org

Silchar Medical College and Hospital (SMCH), established in 1960, is a government-run medical and hospital located in Silchar, southern Assam. It is one of the oldest medical college of North East India. It is the only referral hospital in the southern part of Assam, and serves neighbouring states.

== Inception and earlier years ==
In November 1959, the Chief Minister of Assam, Bimala Prasad Chaliha, called for a second medical hospital in Assam, following the opening of Assam Medical College in 1947. The committee decided two further schools were needed, leading to the Gauhati Medical College, and Silchar Medical College being formed simultaneously in August 1960.

In 1960, the college held its first preclinical classes in Ayurvedic College, while they awaited construction of a permanent campus. This was completed in August 1968. In 1971 the main hospital building was commissioned.

The Medical Council of India (MCI) recognized the MBBS degree in 1976.

In 2008 further PG courses were introduced in Radiology, Pathology, Anaesthesiology and Orthopaedics.

== SMC at a glance ==
Year of establishment at its permanent site	1968
Year of recognition of MBBS course by MCI (now NMC)	1976
No. of students admitted annually in MBBS course	125
No. of students admitted annually in post-graduate courses	71
Current No. of students on Roll in MBBS course	386
Current No. of students on Roll in PG courses	122
Total No. of Teaching Staff	172
Total area of land (in bighas) of the SMC Campus	620

== Courses ==
Graduate education

- Degree awarded: M.B.B.S.
- Duration of the course: Five and a half years including one-year internship.

Postgraduate education

- Courses: Degree (M.D. and M.S.) for three years; Diploma for two years.

Other courses

- Diploma Courses in Pharmacy
- GNM Course in Nursing
- Laboratory Technician Course
- Radiography Training
- B.Sc. Nursing course

== Departments ==
- Anatomy
- Physiology
- Biochemistry
- Pharmacology
- Pathology
- Microbiology
- Forensic and State Medicine
- Community Medicine
- Medicine
- Surgery (which includes Orthopedics)
- Pediatrics
- Obstetrics and Gynaecology
- Ophthalmology
- Otorhinolaryngology

University of Affiliation:

- Assam University, Silchar
- Srimanta Sankaradeva University of Health Sciences from 2010

== Postgraduate education ==
The method of selection is entrance tests conducted by All India and state level selection bodies. Duration of postgraduate course: Degree three years; Diploma two years. For postgraduate (Degree) studies a thesis is compulsory.

Postgraduate Courses available are given below:

- ENT
- General Medicine
- Obstetrics & Gynaecology
- Ophthalmology
- Psychiatry
- General Surgery
- Radio-diagnosis
- Anaesthesiology
- Pathology
- Orthopaedics
- Anatomy
- Physiology
- Bio-Chemistry
- Microbiology
- Pharmacology
- Forensic & SM
- Paediatrics
- Dermatology
- Community Medicine

== SMC Students' Union ==
The Silchar Medical College Students Union was formed, holding annual elections to an executive committee.

== Photo gallery ==
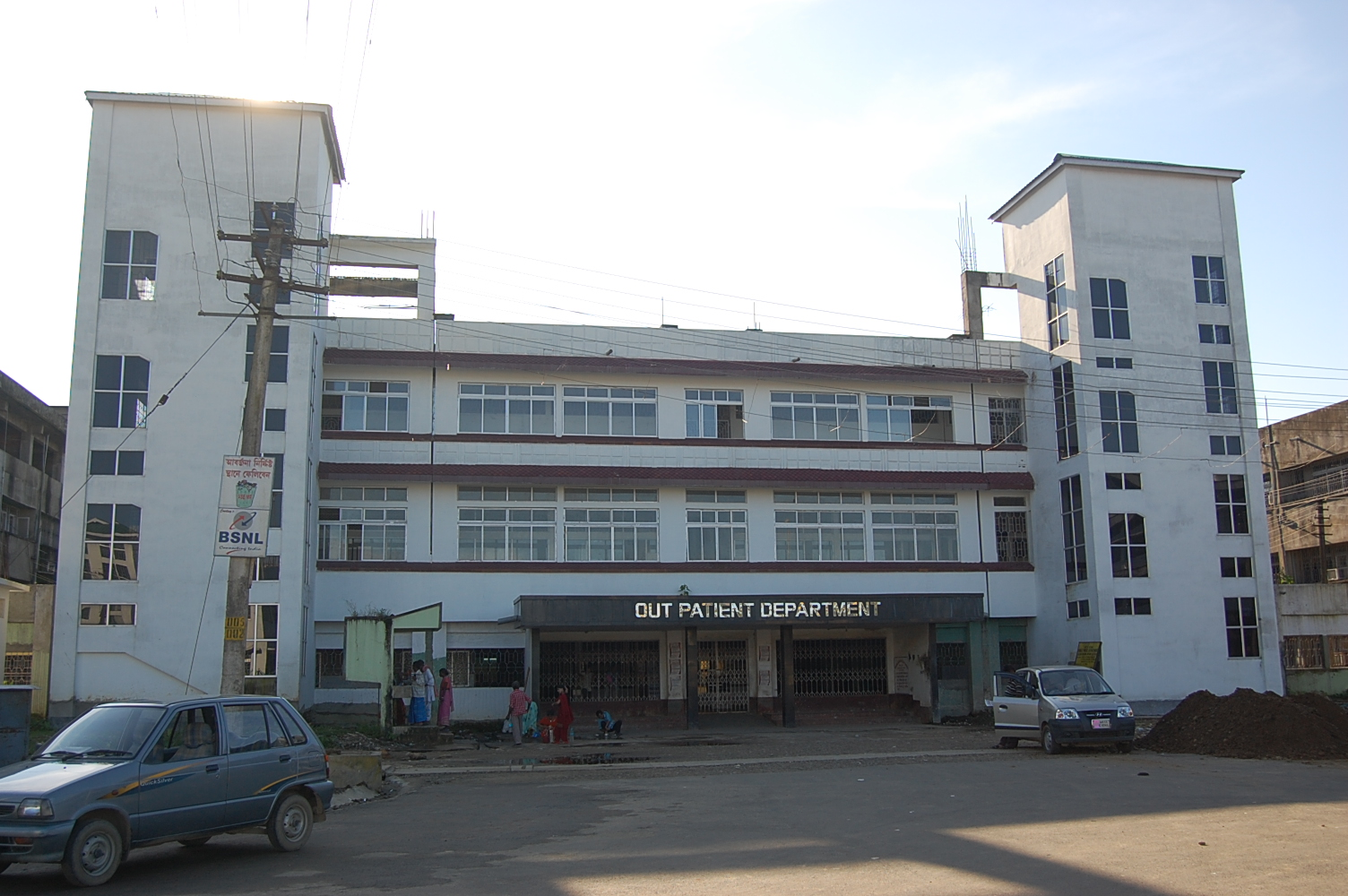
View of SMCH OPD

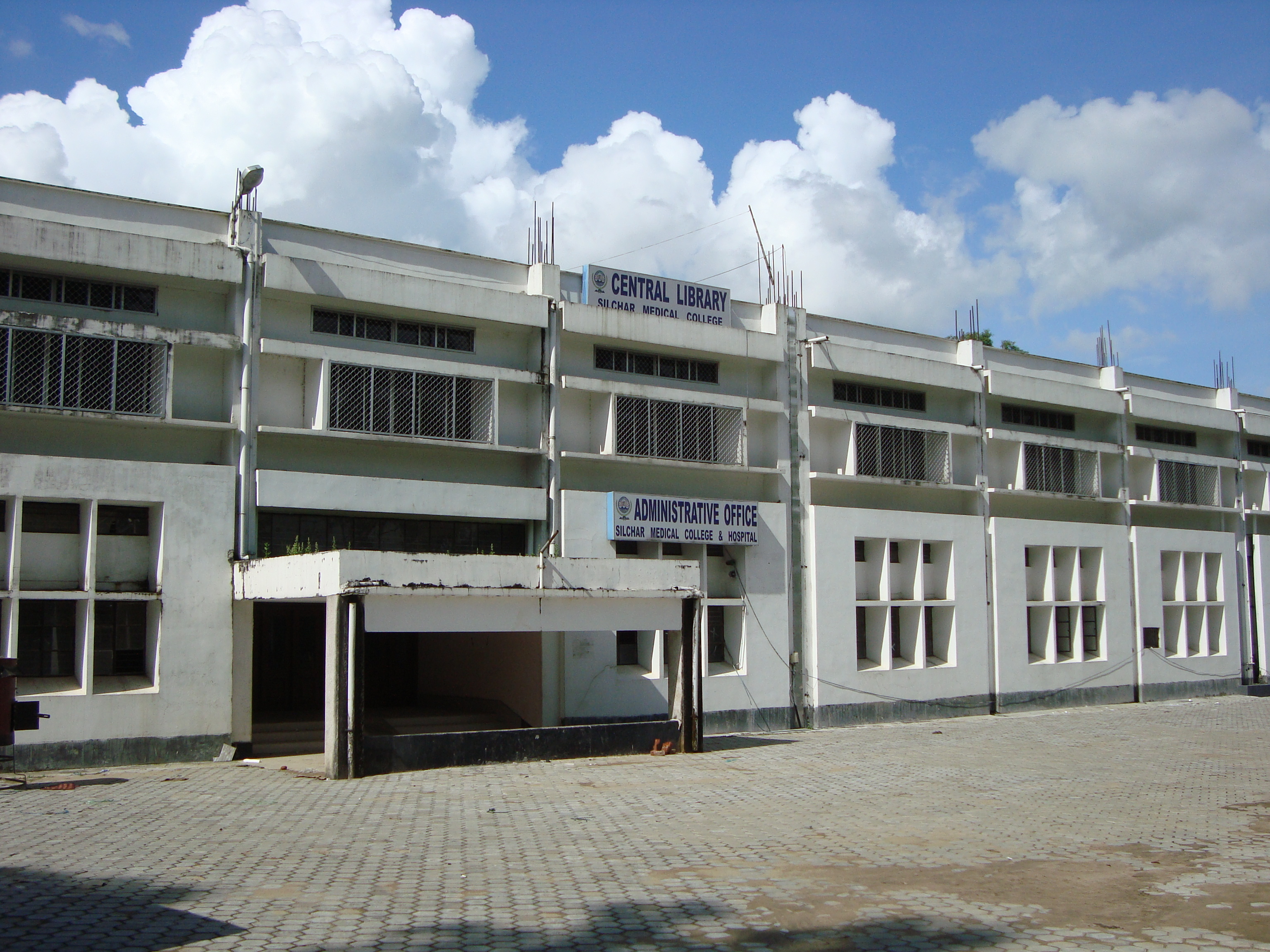
Administrative Building of SMCH

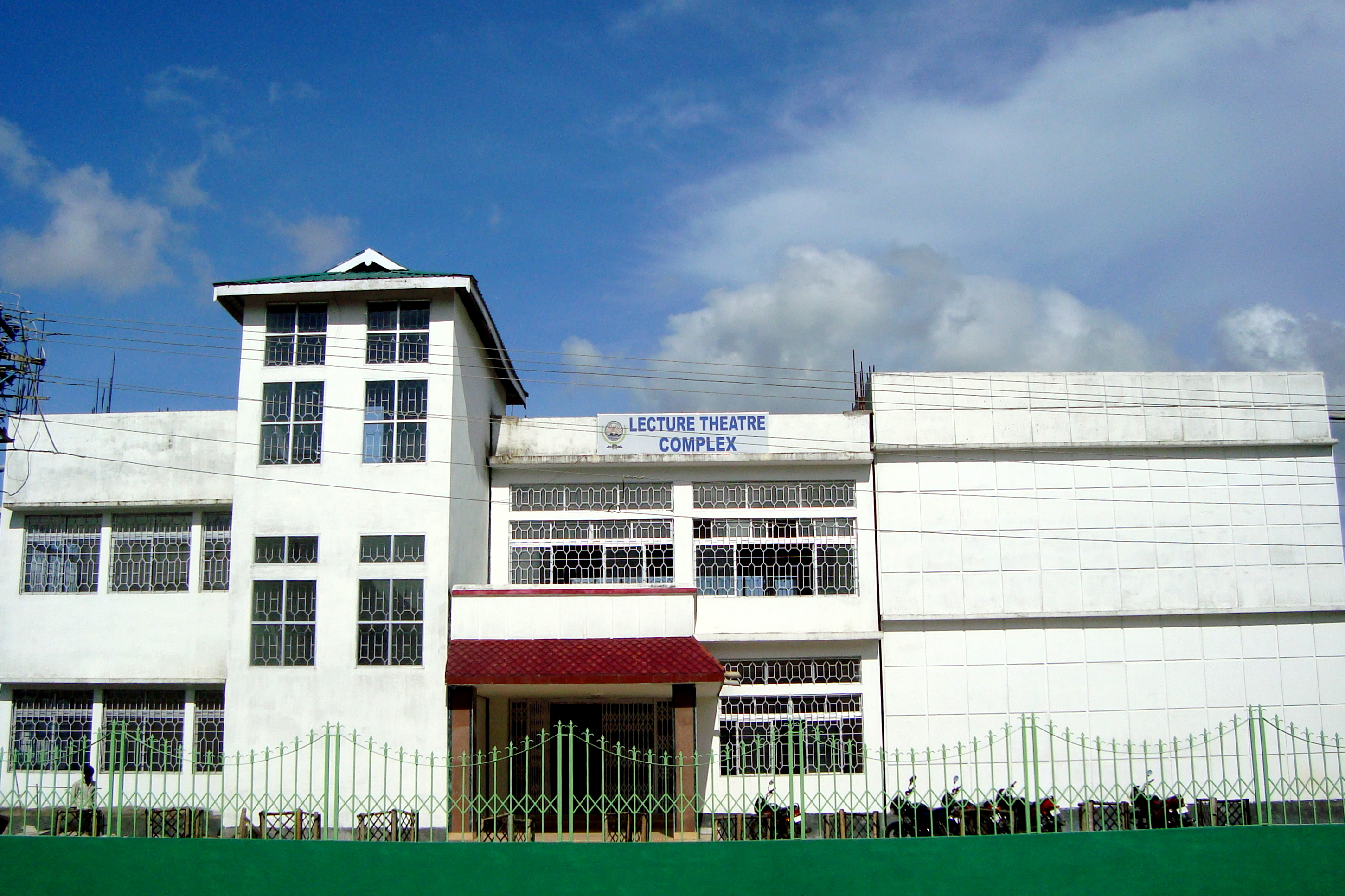
Lecture Theatre Complex at Silchar Medical College
