= List of institutions of higher education in Assam =

This list consists of institutions of higher education in the Indian state of Assam. These university/institutions under the state government usually follow a state-centric syllabus, universities under the central government follows the standard syllabus whereas the private university or educational institutes have their own syllabus.

{This is not a complete list of all institutes; only a few are mentioned.}

== Central universities ==
University	Location	Type state	Established	Specialization	Sources
Assam University	Silchar	Central	1994	General	
Tezpur University	Tezpur	Central	1994	General	

Renovated gate of Tezpur University

== Institute of National Importance ==
Institute	Location	Type	Established	Specialization	Sources
All India Institute of Medical Sciences, Guwahati	Guwahati	Autonomous	2021	Health Sciences	
Indian Institute of Management Guwahati	Guwahati	Autonomous	2025	Management	
Indian Institute of Technology Guwahati	Guwahati	Autonomous	1994	Science, Technology and Management	
Indian Statistical Institute Tezpur	Tezpur	Autonomous	2011	Basic Sciences, Applied Sciences, Social Sciences	
Indian Institute of Information Technology, Guwahati	Guwahati	Autonomous	2013	Technology and Management	
National Institute of Design, Assam	Jorhat	Autonomous	2019	Designing	
National Institute of Technology, Silchar	Silchar	Autonomous	1967	Science, Technology and Management	
National Institute of Pharmaceutical Education and Research, Guwahati	Guwahati	Autonomous	2008	Pharmacy	
National Forensic Sciences University – Guwahati Campus	Guwahati	Autonomous	2022	Forensic Science	

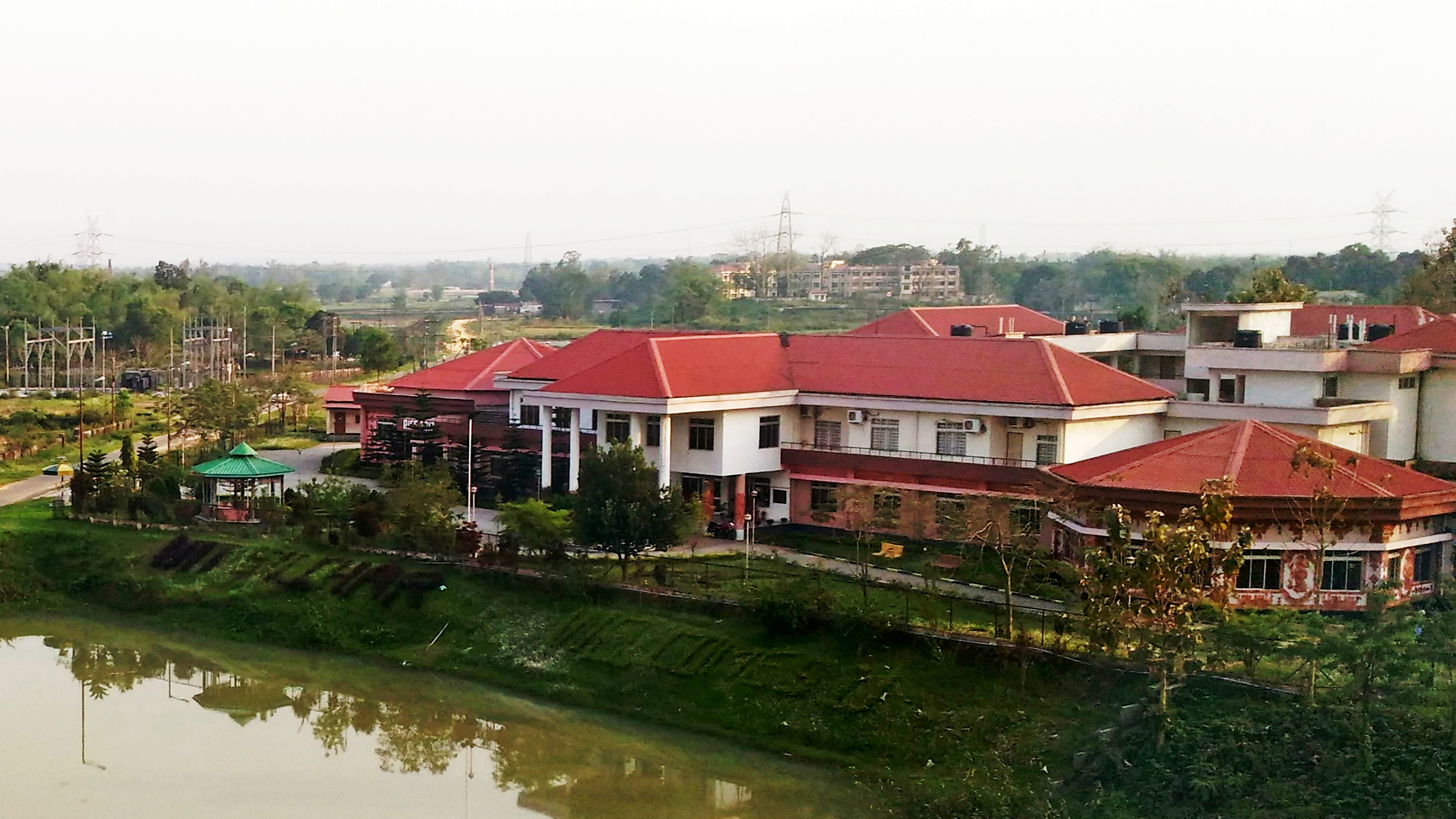
NIT Silchar, Assam

== Deemed universities ==
University	Location	Type	Established	Specialization	Sources
Central Institute of Technology, Kokrajhar	Kokrajhar	Deemed University	2006	Technical	
Tata Institute of Social Sciences	Guwahati	Deemed University	2008	Social Science and Social Work	

== State universities ==
University	Location	Type	Established	Specialization	Sources
Assam Agricultural University	Jorhat	State	1969	Agricultural	
Assam Science and Technology University	Guwahati	State	2010	Engineering, Science & Architecture	
Assam Women's University	Jorhat	State	2013	General	
Assam Skill University	Mangaldai	State	2021	Skill	
Assam Veterinary and Fishery University	Khanapara	State	2025	Veterinary and Fishery	
Birangana Sati Sadhani Rajyik Vishwavidyalaya	Golaghat	State	2021	General	
Bodoland University	Kokrajhar	State	2009	General	
Bhattadev University	Pathsala	State	2019	General	
Cotton University	Guwahati	State	1901	General	
Dibrugarh University	Dibrugarh	State	1965	General	
Gauhati University	Guwahati	State	1948	General	
Krishna Kanta Handique State Open University	Guwahati	State	2007	Distance education	
Kumar Bhaskar Varma Sanskrit and Ancient Studies University	Nalbari	state	2011	General	
Madhabdev University	Narayanpur	State	2019	General	
Majuli University of Culture	Majuli	State	2017	Cultural	
National Law University and Judicial Academy, Assam	Guwahati	State	2009	Law	
Rabindranath Tagore University	Hojai	State	2019	General	
Srimanta Sankaradeva University of Health Sciences	Guwahati	State	2010	Health sciences	
Sri Sri Aniruddhadeva Sports University	Chabua	State	2020	Sports	
Bongaigaon University	Bongaigaon	State	2023	General	
Gurucharan University	Silchar	State	2023	General	
Jagannath Barooah University	Jorhat	State	2023	General	
North Lakhimpur University	North Lakhimpur	State	2023	General	
Nagaon University	Nagaon	State	2023	General	
Sibsagar University	Sivasagar	State	2023	General	
Kokrajhar University	Kokrajhar	State	2024	General	

== Private universities ==
University	Location	Type	Established	Specialization	Sources
Assam Don Bosco University	Guwahati	Private	2008	General	
Assam Down Town University	Guwahati	Private	2010	General	
Auniati University	Jorhat	Private	2022	Cultural	
EdTech Skill University	Tinsukia	Private	2025	General	
Girijananda Chowdhury University	Guwahati	Private	2022	General	
Kaziranga University	Jorhat	Private	2012	General	
Krishnaguru Adhyatmik Vishvavidyalaya	Barpeta	Private – Spiritual	2017	General	
Mahapurusha Srimanta Sankaradeva Viswavidyalaya	Nagaon	Private	2014	General	
Royal Global University	Guwahati	Private	2017	General	
Pragjyotishpur University	Chandrapur, Guwahati	Private	2022	General	
Swami Vivekanand University, Kokrajhar	Kokrajhar	Private	2025	General	

== Medical colleges ==
Name	Established	City	University	Type	Ref.
Assam Medical College	1947	Dibrugarh	SSUHS	State funded	
Dhubri Medical College and Hospital	2022	Dhubri	SSUHS	State funded	
Diphu Medical College and Hospital	2019	Diphu	SSUHS	State funded	
Fakhruddin Ali Ahmed Medical College and Hospital	2011	Barpeta	SSUHS	State funded	
Gauhati Medical College and Hospital	1960	Guwahati	SSUHS	State funded	
Jorhat Medical College and Hospital	2009	Jorhat	SSUHS	State funded	
Lakhimpur Medical College and Hospital	2021	North Lakhimpur	SSUHS	State funded	
Kokrajhar Medical College and Hospital	2023	Kokrajhar	SSUHS	State funded	
Nagaon Medical College and Hospital	2023	Nagaon	SSUHS	State funded	
Nalbari Medical College and Hospital	2023	Nalbari	SSUHS	State funded	
Silchar Medical College and Hospital	1968	Silchar	SSUHS	State funded	
Tezpur Medical College and Hospital	2013	Tezpur	SSUHS	State funded	
Tinsukia Medical College & Hospital	2024	Makum	SSUHS	State funded	
Pragjyotishpur Medical College & Hospital	2025	Guwahati	SSUHS	State funded	
ESIC Medical College & Hospital, Beltola	2025	Guwahati	SSUHS	Employees' State Insurance Corporation (ESIC) funded	
Bongaigaon Medical College & Hospital	2026	Bongaigaon	SSUHS	State funded	

== Law colleges ==
=== List of law colleges affiliated to Dibrugarh University, Dibrugarh ===
- Centre for Juridical Studies, Dibrugarh University
- D.H.S.K. Law College, Dibrugarh
- Dr. Rohini Kanta Barua Law College, Dibrugarh
- Golaghat Law College, Golaghat
- Jorhat Law College, Jorhat
- NERIM Law College, Guwahati
- North Lakhimpur Law College, North Lakhimpur
- Tinsukia Law College, Tinsukia
- S.I.P.E. Law College, Dibrugarh
- Lakhimpur lAW College, Lakhimpur
- Dhemaji Law College, Dhemaji

=== List of law colleges affiliated to Gauhati University, Guwahati ===
- Bongaigaon Law College, Bongaigaon
- BRM Government Law College, Guwahati
- Dhubri Law College, Dhubri
- Dispur Law College, Dispur
- Goalpara Law College, Goalpara
- JB Law College, Guwahati
- Kokrajhar Law College, Kokrajhar
- Morigaon Law College, Morigaon
- Nalbari Law College, Nalbari
- NEF Law College, Guwahati
- Nowgong Law College, Nagaon
- Tezpur Law College, Tezpur
- Mangaldai Law College, Mangaldai
- University Law College, Gauhati University

=== List of law colleges affiliated to Assam University, Silchar ===
- A. K. Chanda Law College
- Diphu Law College
- Karimganj Law College

== Dental colleges ==
- Regional Dental College, Guwahati
- Government Dental College, Silchar
- Government Dental College, Dibrugarh

== Research institutes ==
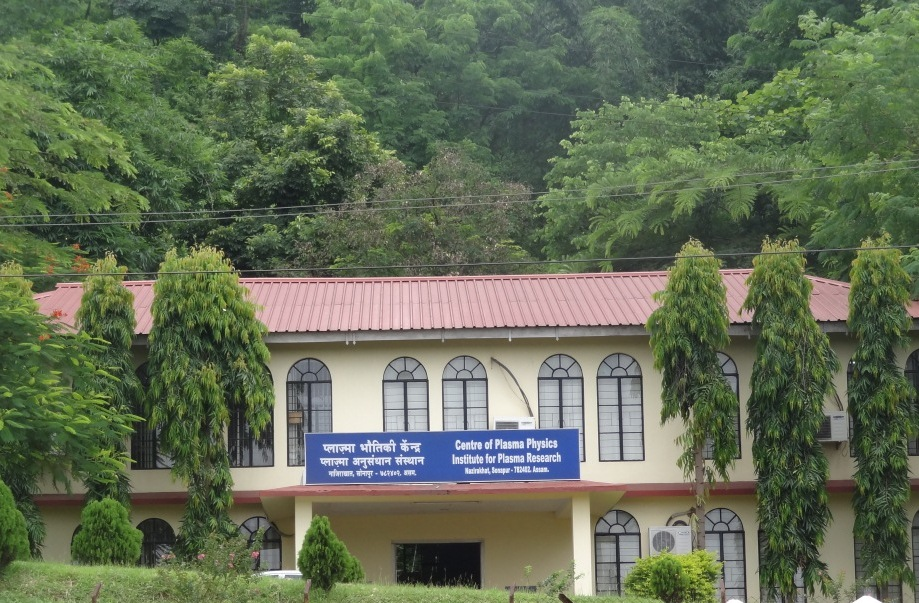
CPP-IPR Administrative building

- Central Inland Fisheries Research Centre (ICAR), Regional Centre, Guwahati – 781006
- Centre of Plasma Physics – Institute for Plasma Research (CPP-IPR),प्लाज्मा भौतिकी केंद्र - प्लाज्मा अनुसन्धान संसथान, Guwahati
- Indian Statistical Institute, Tezpur
- Institute of Advanced Study in Science and Technology, Guwahati
- National Institute of Pharmaceutical Education and Research, Guwahati
- North East Institute of Science and Technology, Jorhat of Council of Scientific and Industrial Research
- Anundoram Borooah Institute of Language, Art and Culture (ABILAC), Guwahati
- Omeo Kumar Das Institute of Social Change and Development
- Rain Forest Research Institute, Jorhat
- Regional Medical Research Centre, Dibrugarh of Indian Council of Medical Research
- Tocklai Tea Research Institute, Jorhat
- Defence Research Laboratory, Tezpur
- ICAR-National Research Centre on Pig, Guwahati
- ICAR-Indian Agriculture Research Institute, Gogamukh
- ICMR-Regional Medical Research Centre, Dibrugarh
- Central Muga Eri Research and Training Institute, Lahdoigarh, Jorhat

== Engineering colleges ==
Name	Established	City	University	Type	Ref.
Assam Engineering College	1955	Guwahati	ASTU	Government	
Jorhat Engineering College	1960	Jorhat	ASTU	Government	
Barak Valley Engineering College	2017	Karimganj	ASTU	Government	
Bineswar Brahma Engineering College	2010	Kokrajhar	ASTU	Government	
Dhemaji Engineering College	2020	Dhemaji	ASTU	Government	
Golaghat Engineering College	2018	Golaghat	ASTU	Government	
Jorhat Institute of Science & Technology	1971	Jorhat	ASTU	Government	
Central Institute of Technology, Kokrajhar	2006	Kokrajhar	Deemed to be University	Government	
Dibrugarh University Institute of Engineering and Technology	2009	Dibrugarh	Dibrugarh University	Government	
Institute of Science and Technology, Gauhati University	2009	Guwahati	Gauhati University	Government	
Indian Institute of Technology Guwahati	1994	Guwahati	IIT (autonomous)	Central government	
National Institute of Technology Silchar	1967	Silchar	NIT (autonomous)	Central government	
Indian Institute of Information Technology, Guwahati	2013	Guwahati	IIIT (autonomous)	Central government	
School of Engineering, Tezpur University	2006	Tezpur	Tezpur University	Central government	
Girijananda Chowdhury Institute of Management and Technology	2006	Guwahati	ASTU	Private	
Don Bosco College of Engineering and Technology	2008	Guwahati	ASTU	Private	

== Government college ==
=== Colleges under Assam Science and Technology University ===
- Assam Engineering College, Guwahati (State)
- Jorhat Engineering College, Jorhat (State)
- Barak Valley Engineering College, Karimganj (State)
- Bineswar Brahma Engineering College, Kokrajhar (State)
- Dhemaji Engineering College, Dhemaji (State)
- Golaghat Engineering College, Golaghat (State)
- Jorhat Institute of Science & Technology, Jorhat(State)

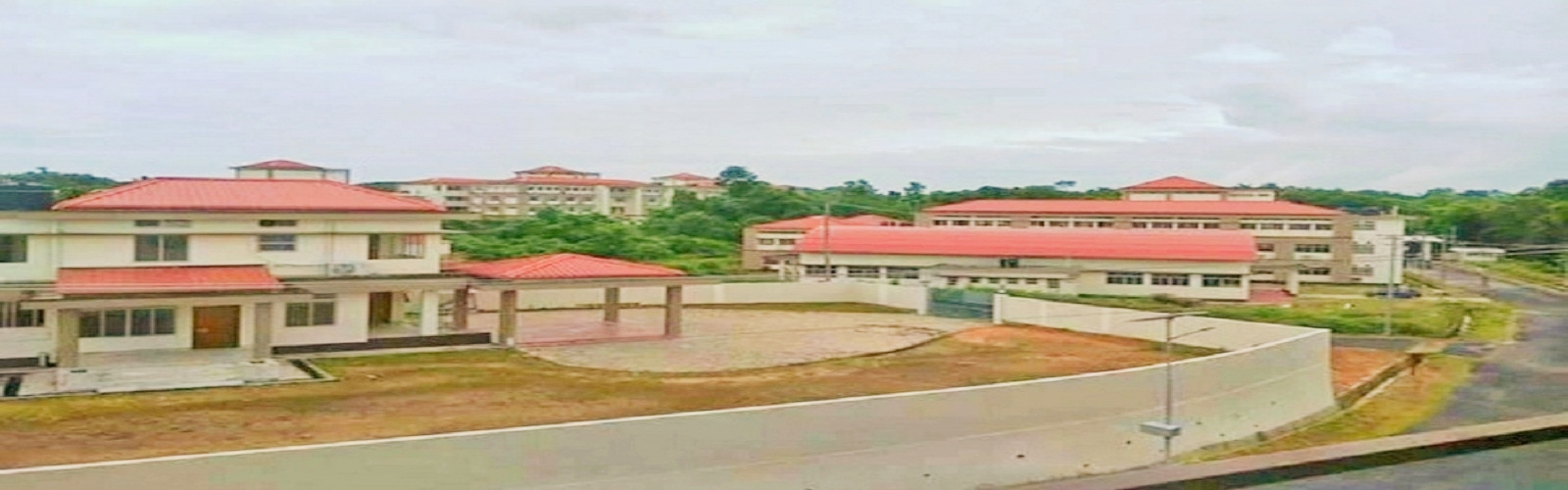
Barak Valley Engineering College, Karimganj

=== Colleges under Dibrugarh University ===
- Dibrugarh University Institute of Engineering and Technology (DUIET), DU campus, Dibrugarh (State)

=== Colleges under Gauhati University ===
- Gauhati University Institute of Science and Technology (GUIST), GU Campus, Guwahati (State)

== Private colleges ==
- School of Engineering, Assam Downtown University
- School of Engineering, Girijananda Chowdhury University
- Royal School of Engineering, Royal Global University
- Kaziranga University Engineering Institute

== Architecture institutes ==
- Guwahati College of Architecture, Guwahati
- Royal School of Architecture, Betkuchi, Guwahati
- Jettwings Institute Of Fashion, Design & Architecture – (JFDA), Uzanbazar, Guwahati

== Autonomous institutions ==
- Indian Institute of Technology Guwahati
- Indian Institute of Information Technology, Guwahati
- National Institute of Technology, Silchar
- National Law University and Judicial Academy, Assam
- National Institute of Pharmaceutical Education and Research, Guwahati
- National Institute of Design, Jorhat
- Tata Institute of Social Sciences, Guwahati
- Central Institute of Technology, Kokrajhar
- Lokopriya Gopinath Bordoloi Regional Institute of Mental Health (LGBRIMH), Tezpur
- Arya Vidyapeeth College (Autonomous) Guwahati
- B. Borooah College Guwahati
- Bir Lachit Borphukan College
- Debraj Roy College
- Furkating College
- Digboi College, Tinsukia

== Hotel management institutes ==
- Assam Institute of Hotel Management, Guwahati
- IAM Institute of Hotel Management, Guwahati
- Institute of Hotel Management, Guwahati
- Gateway ihm Guwahati
- Jettwings Institute Of Aviation & Hospitality Management, GS Road, Guwahati
- Jettwings Hotel & Travel School Under TISS – SVE Deemed University – Approved by AICTE & MHRD New Delhi.
- North East Institute of Management Science, Jorhat

== Management institutes ==
- IIM Guwahati
- Indian Institute of Bank Management
- Indian Institute of Entrepreneurship
- Centre for Management Studies, Dibrugarh University
- Department of Management Studies, National Institute of Technology, Silchar
- Assam Rajiv Gandhi University of Cooperative Management, Sivasagar
- Assam Institute of Management, Guwahati
- Asian Institute of Management and Technology
- Centre of Management Studies, Gauhati Commerce College, Guwahati
- CKB Commerce College, Jorhat
- Department of Business Administration, Gauhati University
- Don Bosco Institute of Management, Guwahati
- Girijananda Chowdhury Institute of Management and Technology, Guwahati
- Institute of Strategic Business Management (ISBM), Guwahati
- Jawaharlal Nehru School of Management Studies, Assam University
- Jettwings Business School (JBS), Uzanbazar, Guwahati
- Kaziranga University, School of Business, Jorhat
- NEF College of Management & Technology, Guwahati
- North Eastern Regional Institute of Management (NERIM), Guwahati
- Royal School Of Business, Guwahati
- School of Management Science, Tezpur University
- Beinstein College, Lokhora, Guwahati
- Indian Institute for Finance And Management (IIFM), Guwahati
- Times Institute of Management and Technical Studies (TIMTS, Guwahati)

== Arts, science and commerce colleges ==
- Abhayapuri College, Bongaigaon
- Amguri College, Amguri, Sivasagar
- Anandaram Dhekial Phookan College, Nagaon
- Beinstein College of Science, Jalukbari, Guwahati
- B. H. B. College, Barpeta
- Bahona College, Jorhat
- Bajali College, Barpeta
- Barpeta Girls' College, Barpeta
- Bengtol College, Chirang
- B. N. College, Dhubri
- Bihpuria College, Bihpuria, Lakhimpur
- Bijni College, Bijni
- Bilasipara College, Bilasipara
- Birjhora Mahavidyalaya, Bongaigaon
- Borholla College, Borholla, Jorhat
- Birjhora Kanya Mahavidyalaya, Bongaigaon
- Cachar College, Silchar
- CKB College, Teok, Jorhat
- CKB Commerce College, Jorhat
- Cotton College Guwahati
- Chaygaon College, Kamrup
- D. H. S. K. Commerce College, Dibrugarh
- Dakha Devi Rasiwasia College, Chabua
- Dakshin Kamrup College, Kamrup
- Dakshin Kamrup Girls' College, Kamrup
- Darrang College, Tezpur
- DCB Girls' College, Jorhat
- Dergaon Kamal Dowerah College, Dergaon
- Dhemaji College, Dhemaji
- Dhemaji Commerce College, Dhemaji
- Dhakuakhana College, Dhakuakhana
- Dhemaji Girls College, Dhemaji
- Dibrugarh City College, Dibrugarh
- Dibrugarh Hanumanbax Surajmall Kanoi College, Dibrugarh
- Dibru College, Dibrugarh
- Digboi College, Digboi
- Dimoria College, Khetri Kamrup Metropolitan district
- Diphu Government College, Diphu
- Dispur College, Guwahati
- DoomDooma College, Doomdooma
- Dr. Nobin Bordoloi College, Dhekiajuli, Jorhat
- Dudhnoi College, Goalpara
- Duliajan College, Duliajan
- Gargaon College, Simaluguri, Sivasagar
- Gauhati Commerce College, Guwahati
- Goalpara College, Goalpara
- Gogamukh College, Gogamukh, Dhemaji
- Golaghat Commerce College, Golaghat
- Goreswar College, Goreswar
- Government Model College Deithor
- Guwahati College, Guwahati
- Haflong Government College, Haflong
- Handique Girls College, Guwahati
- Hatsingimari College, Hatsingimari
- Hemo Prova Borbora Girls' College, Golaghat
- Icon Commerce College, Guwahati
- J.D.S.G. College, Bokakhat
- Jagiroad College, Jagiroad
- Jhanji Hemnath Sarma College, Jhanji
- Jorhat College, Jorhat
- Jorhat Kendriya Mahavidyalaya, Jorhat
- Karmashree Hiteswar Saikia College, Guwahati
- K.C. Das Commerce College, Guwahati
- K.K. Handique Govt. Sanskrit College, Guwahati
- K. R. B. Girl's College, Guwahati
- Kakojan College, Jorhat
- Kaliabor College, Kuwaritol
- Kamargaon College, Bokakhat
- Kampur College, Kampur
- Karimganj College, Karimganj
- Karimganj Law College, karimganj
- Katigorah Anchalik Degree College, Cachar
- Kokrajhar Government College, Kokrajhar
- Lakhimpur Commerce College, North Lakhimpur
- Lakhimpur Girls' College, North Lakhimpur
- Lakhimpur Kendriya Mahavidyalaya, North Lakhimpur
- Lakhipur College, Lakhipur
- Lalit Chandra Bharali College, Guwahati
- Lokanayak Omeo Kumar Das College, Dhekiajuli
- Lumding College, Lumding
- Madhab Chandra Das College, Sonai, Cachar
- Madhab Choudhury College, Barpeta
- Mahendra Narayan Choudhury Balika Mahavidyalaya, Nalbari
- Majuli College, Kamalabari, Majuli
- Mankachar College, Mankachar
- Manohari Devi Kanoi Girls College, Dibrugarh
- Mariani College, Mariani, Jorhat
- Melamora College, Melamora, Golaghat
- Margherita College, Margherita
- Moran College, Moranhat
- Moridhal College, Dhemaji
- Murkongselek College, Jonai
- Nabajyoti College, Kalgachia
- Nabin Chandra College, Badarpur
- Nagaon GNDG Commerce College, Nagaon
- Nalbari College, Nalbari
- Namrup College, Namrup
- Nanda Nath Saikia College, Titabar, Jorhat
- Narangi Anchalik Mahavidyalaya, Guwahati
- Nilambazar College, Karimganj
- North Bank College, Ghilamara
- North Gauhati College, Guwahati
- Nowgong Girls' College, Nagaon
- Pandu College, Guwahati
- Pithubar Girls' Degree College, Khowang
- Pragjyotish College, Guwahati
- Pramathesh Barua College, Gauripur
- Pub Kamrup College, Baihata Chariali
- Rabindra Sadan Girls' College, Karimganj
- Radha Govinda Baruah College, Guwahati
- Ram Krishna Nagar College, Karimganj
- Rangapara College, Rangapara
- Rangia College, Rangia
- Sadiya College, Sadiya
- Sankaradeva Mahavidyalaya, Lakhimpur
- Sarupathar College, Sarupathar
- S. B. Deorah College, Guwahati
- Science College, Kokrajhar
- Sibsagar Commerce College, Sivasagar
- Sibsagar Girls' College, Sivasagar
- Silapathar College, Silapathar
- Silapathar Commerce College, Silapathar
- Silapathar Town College, Silapathar
- Sissi Borgaon College, Dhemaji
- Sonari College, Sonari
- Sonapur College, Sonapur
- South Salmara College, South Salmara
- Suren Das College, Hajo
- Srikishan Sarda College, Hailakandi
- Swadeshi College of Commerce, Guwahati
- Tangla College, Tangla
- Tezpur College Tezpur
- Tihu College, Tihu
- Tinsukia College, Tinsukia
- Tinsukia Commerce College, Tinsukia
- Tyagbir Hem Baruah College (T.H.B), Jamugurihat, Sonitpur
- Upendra Nath Brahma College, kajalgaon
- West Goalpara College, Goalpara
- Women's College, Tinsukia
