= List of educational institutions in Guwahati =

Educational institutions in Guwahati include:

{This is not a complete list of all institutes; only a few are mentioned.}

== Universities ==
- Assam Don Bosco University
- Assam Down Town University
- Assam Science and Technology University
- Cotton University
- Gauhati University
- Girijananda Chowdhury University
- Lakshmibai National Institute of Physical Education, NE Regional Centre
- National Law University and Judicial Academy, Assam
- Pragjyotishpur University
- Royal Global University
- Tata Institute of Social Sciences, Guwahati Campus

== Social Sciences ==
- Tata Institute of Social Science, Guwahati Campus
- Ascent Academy Group of Institutions, Guwahati

== Dental ==
- Regional Dental College, Guwahati

== Homoeopathic ==
- SJN Homoeopathic Medical College and Hospital, Guwahati

== Medical ==
- Assam Govt. Ayurvedic College, Guwahati
- Gauhati Medical College and Hospital

== ParaMedical ==
- Institute of Paramedical Sciences, GMC

== Law colleges ==
- National Law University and Judicial Academy, Assam
- BRM Government Law College
- Dispur Law College
- JB Law College
- NEF Law College
- Unique Law Institute, Guwahati.( A premier law coaching center of North East)
- University Law College, Gauhati University
- NERIM Law College, NERIM Group of Institutions

== Engineering ==
- Assam Engineering College
- Assam Engineering Institute
- Don Bosco College of Engineering and Technology
- Indian Institute of Information Technology, Guwahati
- Indian Institute of Technology Guwahati
- Institute of Science and Technology, Gauhati University
- Royal School of Engineering & Technology
- Scholar's Institute of Technology & Management

== Management ==
- IIM Guwahati
- Indian Institute of Bank Management
- Indian Institute of Entrepreneurship
- Asian Institute of Management and Technology
- Assam Institute of Management
- Department of Business Administration, Gauhati University
- Don Bosco Institute of Management
- Institute of Strategic Business Management, (ISBM)
- NEF College of Management & Technology
- North Eastern Regional Institute of Management, (NERIM)
- Pragati School of Management
- Royal School of Business

== Architecture ==
- Guwahati College of Architecture
- Royal School of Architecture

== Hotel Management ==
- Assam Institute of Hotel Management, Guwahati
- IAM Institute of Hotel Management, Guwahati
- Institute of Hotel Management, Guwahati (IHM)
- Pragati School of Management

== Other Colleges ==
- Arya Vidyapeeth College (Autonomous)
- Ascent Academy Junior College, Guwahati
- B. Borooah College
- Beinstein College of Science
- BMBB Commerce College
- Brahmaputra College
- Dispur College (Autonomous)
- Guwahati College
- Gauhati Commerce College (Autonomous)
- Handique Girls College
- Icon Commerce College
- Karmashree Hiteswar Saikia College
- K.C. Das Commerce College
- Lalit Chandra Bharali College
- Narengi Anchalik Mahavidyalaya
- North Gauhati College
- Oriental College of Science & Commerce, Guwahati
- Pandu College
- Pragjyotish College (Autonomous)
- Radha Govinda Baruah College
- S. B. Deorah College
- Swadeshi College of Commerce
- West Guwahati College
- College of Veterinary Science, Khanapara

== Schools ==
- NPS International School
- Spring Dale International School
- Vandya International School
- International School Guwahati
- Cambridge International School
- The Green School International
- ADHYAYAN INTERNATIONAL SCHOOL
- Finland International School
- The Hidayah International School
- Skies And Beyond International School
- Don Bosco School
- The down town School
- Miles Bronson Residential School
- Anand Academy High School, Super Market, Dispur
- Army Public School, Narangi
- Assam Jatiya Bidyalay
- Ascent Academy High School, Guwahati
- Axel Public School, Guwahati
- (Cambridge) International School, Guwahati
- Central Public School, Guwahati
- Cotton Collegiate Government H.S. School, Panbazar
- Don Bosco School, Dakhingaon, Sonaighuli
- Don Bosco School, Panbazar
- Delhi Public School, Guwahati
- East Point Montessori School, Birkuchi
- Faculty Higher Secondary School, Amingaon
- Fairyland School
- GEMS NPS International School, Guwahati
- Godwins Public School, Near Sarusajai, Guwahati
- Gopal Boro Government Higher Secondary School
- Gurukul Grammar Senior Secondary School, Geeta Nagar, Mathgharia
- Guwahati Public School, Batahghuli, Panjabari
- Gyan Educational Institution
- Happy Child High School, Rehabari
- Hindustani Kendriya Vidyalaya
- Holy Child School Guwahati
- Delhi Public School Khanapara
- Kendriya Vidyalaya 9th Mile
- Kendriya Vidyalaya, Khanapara
- Kendriya Vidyalaya Maligaon
- Little Flower School, Hatigaon
- Little Pearls School, Narengi Tinali, Bonda
- Maharishi Vidya Mandir School, Krishna Nagar, Silpukhuri
- Maharishi Vidya Mandir Senior Secondary School, Barsajai, Lalmati
- Maria's Public School, Birkuchi, Narengi
- Miles Bronson Residential School, Guwahati
- Modern English School, Odalbakra, Kahilipara
- Montfort School, Amerigog, Guwahati
- NPS International School, Lokhra, Saukuchi
- Pearl Valley High School
- Pragjyotish Senior Secondary School, Paschim Boragaon
- PURBASHA VIDYANIKETAN
- Royal Global School
- Saint Francis D'Assisi Senior Secondary School, Pub Boragaon, Garchuk
- SARALA BIRLA GYAN JYOTI
- S.B.O.A Public School, Garchuk
- Shrimanta Shankar Academy
- South Point School
- St. Francis De Sales Higher Secondary School, Pathar Quarry, Narengi
- St. Stephen's School, Christian Basti
- Suderashan Public School, Khanapara
- St. Mary's English High School, Guwahati
- St. Vivekananda English Academy, Maligaon
- Tarini Choudhury Govt. Girls H.S. & M.P. School
- The Scholar School, Bagharbari, Satgaon
- Y.W.C.A. English High School, Satribari, Guwahati
