= Assam Combined Entrance Examination =

Entrance examination for government engineering colleges in Assam, India

- Acronym: Assam CEE
- Type: Pen & Paper based
- Administrator: Assam Science and Technology University
- Skills tested: Physics, Chemistry and Mathematics
- Purpose: Admission to B.Tech/B.E course in Engineering Colleges of Assam
- Duration: 3 hours
- Offered: Once a year
- Regions: Assam
- Languages: English, Assamese language
- Annual number of test takers: 25,000 - 40,000
- Website: www.astu.ac.in

Assam Combined Entrance Examination (Assam-CEE) is a state-government controlled centralized entrance examination, conducted by the Assam Science and Technology University for admission into the seven premier government engineering colleges in Assam. The test is taken after the 12th grade for admission to graduation (also known as Bachelor of Technology or Bachelor of Engineering) courses. The exam can be taken by those who studied Pure Science stream in plus two level with the specific subjects tested in the examination, which are Physics, Chemistry, Mathematics. Every year approximately 25,000 - 40,000 students take the examination, and it is increasing every year. Students of both Assam Higher Secondary Education Council and the Central Board of Secondary Education board take the test. Formerly the examination was conducted by Dibrugarh University and since 2018 it is conducted by Assam Science & Technology University. It was previously known as the Assam Joint Admission Test (Assam-JAT) until the year 2012 and comprised both engineering and medical entrance examinations. Since then, the medical section of JAT was known as Assam Medical Entrance Examination (Assam-MEE).

It is a highly competitive test having selection ratio of approximately around 4.48%.

== Eligibility criteria ==
To appear in the Assam CEE exam, applicants are must to meet with following eligibility criteria:

- Candidates must possess a domicile of Assam state.
- Applicant’s age must be in between 17 and 21 years as on August of that year. Three years of relaxation in age is specified for reserved category applicants and one year for graduate applicants.

Upper age limit is relaxed to 22 years in case of B.Sc. passed Candidates. Upper age limit is relaxed by 3 years for Scheduled Cast and Scheduled Tribe candidates.

- For admission into B.E./B.Tech Courses the candidate must pass the Qualifying Examination individually in the same sitting without any grace marks in the subject of Physics, Chemistry, Mathematics and English with a minimum of 50 % (45 % in case of SC and 40 % in case of ST) marks taken together in Physics, Chemistry and Mathematics. The same sitting means a candidate must appear all the four subjects i.e. Physics, Chemistry, Mathematics and English together.
- The Candidate must possess a good moral character.
- The Candidate must be physically and mentally fit.

== Exam pattern ==
The examination pattern was changed from the year 2017 onwards. The new pattern is given below:

- Number of questions: 120
- Maximum marks: 480
- Question type: objective
- Duration: 3 hours
- Marking Scheme: +4 for correct response and -1 for incorrect response.

The examination have multiple choice questions and consist of single paper and take three hours. Questions will be distributed as follows:

- Mathematics: 40 Questions
- Physics: 40 Questions
- Chemistry: 40 Questions

Four marks will be awarded for every right answer and one will be deducted for every wrong answer. No mark will be awarded if the candidate selects more than one option. Therefore, the maximum mark is 480 and the minimum is -120. Once marked, an answer cannot be changed.

== Participating Institutes ==
Participating public colleges under the State government are listed below:

- Assam Engineering College (420 seats for B.Tech course)
- Jorhat Engineering College (315 seats for B.Tech course)
- Jorhat Institute of Science & Technology (240 seats for B.Tech course)
- Bineswar Brahma Engineering College (240 seats for B.Tech course)
- Barak Valley Engineering College (240 seats for B.Tech course)
- Dhemaji Engineering College (180 seats for B.Tech course)
- Golaghat Engineering College, (180 seats for B.Tech course)
- Institute of Science and Technology, Gauhati University, Guwahati (130 seats for B. Tech course)

With permission from Director of Technical Education (DTE), Government of Assam, other Private Institutions may also be allowed to participate in the counselling process. Some of the institute/college are listed below:

- Girijananda Chowdhury Institute of Management and Technology, Tezpur
- Scholar's Institute of Technology & Management, Guwahati
- NETES Institute of Technology and Science Mirza
- Don Bosco College Of Engineering & Technology, Guwahati
- Royal School of Engineering & Technology, Guwahati
- Assam Down Town University, Guwahati
- School of Engineering and Technology, Kaziranga University, Jorhat

== Exam centers ==
1. Silchar
2. Bongaigaon
3. Nalbari
4. Lakhimpur
5. Guwahati
6. Tezpur
7. Nagaon
8. Jorhat
9. Dibrugarh
