= Higher education controversy in Odisha =

Coordinates: 21.0°N 85.1°E

The higher education controversy in Odisha is a sensitive political issue that has caused parliamentary walkouts, violence, and unrest, and has been the subject of scholarly publications regarding the Indian state of Odisha. According to media reports, there has been large-scale discrimination in setting up these institutions of higher learning against a few states, especially Odisha.

It has also been observed within scholarly circles that Odisha (known before 2011 as Orissa) is routinely discriminated against by the Indian government, which has caused the state to lag behind the rest of the nation in terms of infrastructure, poverty reduction, literacy, education, and health.

== Origin ==
In the 11th five-year plan, the Ministry of Human Resources Development (HRD), Manmohan Singh's government had proposed to set up several premier technical institutes across the country to produce a world-class talent pool in science, engineering, and management, which would contribute significantly towards the economic development of the states where they are located, as well as the nation. The then HRD Minister, Arjun Singh, proposed setting up three new IITs, three IISERs, five new IIMs, twenty new IIITs and four new SPAs, which would receive direct funding from the central government instead of relying on smaller budgets through their state and local governments. Media reports reveal that the distribution of these institutions across the states is highly oblique and largely dependent on the political influence of the state in question.

The following table shows the distributions of centrally funded institutions across India :

State	Established institutions	Planned institutions
Andhra Pradesh	2 Central univ., IITTM, IIT	SPA, 2 IIESTs, Central univ.
Arunachal Pradesh	NE Regional Inst. of Sc., Central Univ	(None)
Assam	IIT, NIPER, 2 Central univ.	(None)
Bihar	IIT, NIPER	(None)
Chhattisgarh	(IIM, NIT, Central Univ)	(AIIMS)
Delhi	IIT, IITTM, AIIMS, SPA, 4 Central univ.	(None)
Goa	(1 Central Univ, National Institute of Water Sports [Under IITTM])	(National Institute of Technology)
Gujarat	IIM, NIPER, IIT, NID	(None)
Haryana	NITTR	(IIM, Central Univ)
Himachal Pradesh	Indian Inst. of Adv. Studies	(IIT)
Jammu & Kashmir	(National Institute of Technology, Srinagar)	(none)
Jharkhand	Indian School of Mines, NIFFT	(None)
Karnataka	IISc, IIM, ISI, IIIT	(None)
Kerala	IIM, SCT Instt. of Med. Sc., IISER	IIST
Madhya Pradesh	IIM, IIITM, IITTM, NITTR, IIITD&M, NIT, IISER	SPA, IIT, AIIMS, NID, World Class Univ, Central Univ
Maharashtra	IIT, NITIE, BOAT, AFMC, Central univ., IISER	(None)
Manipur	Central Agr. Univ.	Central univ.
Meghalaya	Central univ.	IIM
Mizoram	Central univ.	(None)
Nagaland	Central univ.	(None)
Orissa	NISER, CIPET, RMRC, NIRTR, IIPH, IoDS, RIE, CTRTC, IMMT, IoP, NIT, IIHT, ILS, XIMB, IIIT, IITTM, IIMC, IIT, AIIMS, IISER, IIM, NRRI, Central Univ.	(None)
Punjab	NIPER, SLIET, NITTR, IISER	(None)
Rajasthan	IIT	(AIIMS)
Sikkim	(None)	Central univ.
Tamil Nadu	IIT, NITTR, BOAT, Central univ.	IIIT
Tripura	(None)	Central univ.
Uttarakhand	IIT	(None)
Uttar Pradesh	IIT, IIM, IIIT, BOAT, 3 Central univ.	IIEST, Central univ.
West Bengal	IIT	(None)

== Alleged discrimination in existing institutions ==
None of the premier institutions of national importance are located in the eastern state of Odisha. In terms of per capita funding received from the HRD ministry, it is among the bottom-most of all states. The only states below it are Bihar, Rajasthan, and a few very small states in the northeastern region. There have been estimates of the amount of HRD funding received by each state within the Indian union. One recently published estimate is provided in the table below.

State	Total^{2}	Per capita	Times Orissa	State	Total^{*}	Per capita	Times Orissa
Andhra Pradesh	124.60	16	3.94	Arunachal Pradesh	14.5	127.00	31.2
Assam	225.74	82.00	20.13	Bihar	15.38	1.87	0.46
Chhattisgarh	15.38	17.40	1.82	Delhi	262.83	177.12	43.49
Goa	0.00	0.00	0.00	Gujarat	25.63	4.87	1.20
Haryana	18.85	8.52	2.09	Himachal Pradesh	21.18	33.79	8.30
Jammu & Kashmir	15.38	14.51	3.56	Jharkhand	43.64	16.22	3.98
Karnataka	136.63	25.13	6.17	Kerala	25.63	7.90	1.94
Madhya Pradesh	42.61	7.20	1.77	Maharashtra	172.03	17.09	4.20
Manipur	0.00	0.00	0.00	Meghalaya	54.61	225.10	55.27
Mizoram	54.61	584.05	143.40	Nagaland	54.61	249.01	61.14
Orissa	15.38	4.07	1.00	Punjab	33.55	13.34	3.27
Rajasthan	15.38	2.59	0.64	Sikkim	0.00	0.00	0.00
Tamil Nadu	112.77	17.79	4.37	Tripura	0.00	0.00	0.00
Uttarakhand	89.40	105.42	25.88	Uttar Pradesh	293.53	17.08	4.19
West Bengal	232.71	28.10	6.90	India Total	2102.31	20.00	4.91

^{*}in crore (=10,000,000) rupees

The non-allocation of quality educational institutions to the state of Odisha by New Delhi has been interpreted by various quarters, ranging from politicians to Oriya academics living abroad, as proof of discrimination against the state by the HRD ministry. Odisha, which has 3.6% of the population of India, receives a minuscule 0.73% of the allocated budget. This, it is claimed falls within the purview of a larger pattern of what the national media has labelled as the "step-motherly treatment" meted out to Odisha by the government of India.

== Alleged discrimination in establishing new institutions ==
India's recent rapid economic expansion has created the need for more world-class talent. The Human Resources and Development ministry has undertaken the need to set up several more institutions of international quality. A total of twenty-three institutions were announced, including more IITs, IIMs, IISERs, Central Universities all under the 11th Five Year Plan. As before, the state of Odisha has not been allocated any institution of national importance and continues to be the last state in terms of per capita investment in human resources by the Indian government. The regional disparities in this regard have been pointed out even by C. N. R. Rao, the scientific advisor to the Prime Minister of India.

=== Establishing an IIT in Odisha ===
The HRD ministry has recently announced plans to build three additional IITs in the states of Rajasthan, Bihar, and Andhra Pradesh. According to recent reports, the allocation of the new IITs to Rajasthan and Bihar is to compensate them for earlier neglect. Andhra Pradesh, which borders Odisha, will get the third IIT, allegedly shifted from Odisha. If the Indian media is to be believed, the UPA government has categorically declined to establish an IIT in Orissa.

=== Planned NIS for Odisha ===
Government of India had picked Bhubaneswar, the capital city of Odisha, as one of the locations for an NISc, which was later could not materialise due to "UGC cannot establish the proposed Centres for Studies in Integrated Sciences under Sections 12 (ccc) or 12 (j) of the UGC Act". This issue was resolved when it was decided to set up a similar institution, the National Institute for Science, which would be funded through a separate ministry. NISER is the only such upcoming institution in Odisha, whereas other states have had similar non-HRD funded institutions for several decades.

=== Establishing a Central University in Odisha's KBK region ===
The Koraput-Balangir-Kalahandi (KBK) region of Odisha is one of the most backward regions of India, with famines and large-scale starvation deaths reported each year. The region lacks infrastructure and the Indian government has done very little to alleviate the plight of the impoverished masses in those districts. There is a long-standing demand by the people of Odisha for the Indian government to establish a central university in this region, as part of the plan to ameliorate the poverty through various direct and indirect means such as education, as is being done in the underdeveloped north-east region.

=== Establishing an IIM in Odisha ===
The government of India declared an intention to establish five new IIMs in the country in the 2014-15 Budget speech of the Finance Minister. Odisha State has been granted one IIM institute which the State Government is planning to establish in the second largest knowledge hub of Odisha, Sambalpur having three renowned universities. It is the center of western Odisha with good communication facilities like Jharsuguda and Sambalpur railway junction and an ongoing airport project in Jharsuguda at 50 km distance.

=== Demands for centrally funded institutions ===
In January 2014 Union Minister of Steel offered to convert Puri based Biju Patnaik National Steel Institute to a Centre of Excellence with the status of Deemed University

In July 2014 Government of Odisha urged to Government of India to facilitate setting up a NIMHANS like institution at Cuttack location.

In 2015 Government of Odisha gave a formal proposal to Union Government for establishment of an All- India Institute of Hygiene and Public Health (AIIHPH) in the State.

In 2017 CM Naveen Patnaik demanded to central govt for Institute of National Importance status for NISER, Jatani through Act of parliament.

In 2020 Union MOP&NG and Minister of Steel Dharmendra Pradhan writes to Ramesh Pokhriyal, seeks Central University status for Utkal University.

In 2021 CM Naveen Patnaik raised the demand for establishment of 2nd AIIMS for Sundergarh district.

In March 2022 Bargarh MP Suresh Pujari demands in Parliament to convert VSSUT Burla in the line of Central Institute of Technology, Kokrajhar of Assam.

The mass convention proposed by the Nagarik Suraksha Samiti in Rourkela in August 2023 has demanded setting up of a Central Tribal University (CTU) in Sundargarh district. In December 2023, Chandra Sekhar Sahu, the BJD MP from Berhampur, has indeed made a significant demand for the establishment of a Central Tribal University in Odisha.

In March 2025, 11 MLAs from Ganjam district have collectively urged Chief Minister Mohan Charan Majhi to establish NIPER in Berhampur. Earlier, several social activists and local leaders submitted memorandums advocating for the establishment of NIPER, emphasizing its importance for educational and economic development in the region.

== Politics related to the issue ==
=== Hot parliamentary issue ===
Politicians including the chief minister of Odisha, Mr. Naveen Patnaik, have sought to cast this festering issue as a sign of severe neglect of the state by the government in New Delhi led by the United Progressive Alliance (UPA). In May 2007, the issue became a major issue in the Indian parliament. In his words, "Orissa does not have a single institution of national excellence and the demand for IIT is a long-standing one". The opposition National Democratic Alliance (NDA) staged a walk-out in the Indian parliament, accusing the ruling UPA of neglecting the state's economic development.

It was reported by sections of the media in May 2007 that the Congress party-led UPA government was embarrassed by this issue. The HRD minister, Mr. Arjun Singh has also relented.

=== Street protests against alleged discrimination ===
There have been several incidents of protest in Odisha in 2007. Students have taken to the streets to demand the setting up of an IIT and other educational institutions in Odisha. Agamee Orissa, an organisation spearheading a mass agitation in Odisha has organised statewide rallies. There also have been stray incidents of violence related to the issue of Odisha's neglect. In May 2007, this issue was taken up by the National Students Union of India (NSUI).
