= Bandita Phukan =

Indian writer

- Born: 16 February 1948 (age 78); Dhekiajuli, Sonitpur district, Assam, India
- Education: B.E. in Mechanical Engineering
- Alma mater: Assam Engineering College
- Occupations: Writer, engineer
- Spouse: Shyamanta Phukan
- Writing career
- Language: Assamese
- Genres: Science literature, Science fiction, Children's literature, Translation
- Notable works: Seujiya Dharani; Jumi, Rima aru Sihot; Mahan Bigyanir Shoishab Kal
- Notable awards: Bal Sahitya Puraskar
- Website: banditaphukan.com

Bandita Phukan (born 16 February 1948) is an Indian novelist, short story writer, translator, children's author, and science fiction writer from Assam. She is the first woman from Assam and Northeast India to obtain a degree in mechanical engineering.

She began her literary career as a translator and later emerged as a prominent writer of science-based and children's literature. In 2011, she received the Sahitya Akademi Award for Children's Literature for her novel Seujiya Dharani. She has published more than 120 books. Her work Mahan Bigyanir Shoishab Kal has been translated into the Bodo language.

She made her literary debut with the science fiction story Priyatama, published in the Assamese monthly magazine Bismoy.

== Early life and education ==
Bandita Phukan was born on 16 February 1948 in Dhekiajuli, in present-day Sonitpur district of Assam, India. She spent part of her childhood in the North-East Frontier Agency (NEFA), now known as Arunachal Pradesh. When the medium of instruction in schools there changed from Assamese to Hindi, she moved to Assam and continued her education at Nagaon Girls' High School.

She later qualified in the entrance examination for Assam Engineering College, Jalukbari, and graduated in 1971 with a Bachelor of Engineering degree in mechanical engineering. She is widely regarded as the first woman from Assam and the Northeast region of India to graduate in mechanical engineering.

== Professional career ==
After completing her engineering degree, Phukan began her professional career with Assam Gas Company. She subsequently worked with Oil India Limited, Assam Conductors & Tubes Limited, and the Assam Industrial Development Corporation. In 2001, she opted for voluntary retirement from service. Phukan completed her engineering degree and worked in multiple engineering organizations.

Following her retirement, she briefly worked with an industrial organization in the United States before returning to Assam. She later devoted herself full-time to literary activities.

== Awards and recognition ==
- Bal Sahitya Puraskar (2011) for Seujiya Dharani
