= Techxetra =

TechXetra
- Genre: Student organised, non-profit technical extravaganza
- Locations: Tezpur, India
- Founded: October 2008
- Major events: Robotics, Workshops, D'Colloseum, Nirmaan, Full Throttle
- Sponsor: Tezpur University
- Motto: Expanding the frontiers of technology
- Website: web.archive.org/web/20230405051649/https://techxetra.in/ archived

TechXetra was the National Level Annual Techno-Cultural Festival of Tezpur University, India. TechXetra is a combination of two words: tech, short for technology and xetra, meaning terrain. It included technical, management, and cultural events. TechXetra attracted enthusiasts from various parts of India, especially North-East India, for engineering and non-engineering students. It was sometimes abbreviated Tx in social networking websites.

== Tezpur University (a Central University) ==
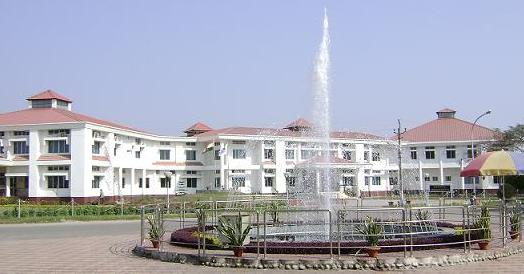
University Administrative Block

Tezpur University is an Indian central university, established by an act of Parliament in 1994 in Tezpur, Assam. It offers employment oriented and interdisciplinary courses in engineering, humanities, business administration, science and many others, to meet the regional and national needs. It also promotes research.

== History ==
TechXetra opened 17 October 2008. Its main vision was to provide a platform for the budding technical and non-technical students of North-East India to showcase their talents in their respective fields of interest. In 2009, it made an effort to bring in the necessary resources and events. TechXetra 2010 had a blend of science and technology coalesced with cultural events. It had more than 30 events and witnessed large participation.

=== 2011 ===
TechXetra 2011 was organised with more than 45 competitive events, besides workshops conducted by firms, debate competitions, quizzes with quiz-master Mr. Ochintya Sharma, President, Karnataka Quiz Association etc.

The invited speakers in the lecture series were:

1. Dr T Ramasami, currently Secretary to the Government of India, Department of Science and Technology (India).
2. Air Marshall P. K. Barbora, Vice Chief of the Air Staff.
3. Nitin Gupta, Founder and CEO, Entertainment Engineers.
4. Mr. Ochintya Sharma, Vice President in Samsung India.

The Indian death metal band Bhayanak Maut performed and judged the finals of Metanoia 2011, the rock band competition. Also, there was a performance by Anushka Manchanda on the last night of TechXetra 2011.

=== 2012 ===
TechXetra 2012 had more than 60 competitive events, along with technical workshops, debate competitions and quiz with Mr. Vijay Anand Menon, Economic Times Young Achiever, 2011 etc.

The invited speakers included were:

1. A NASA webinar with astronaut Michael Fincke
2. Dr J. Narayana Das, Outstanding Scientist, Chief Controller R&D, D.R.D.O..
3. Mr. Balasaheb Darade, Ex. N.A.S.A. Engineer.
4. Mr. Kanak Gogoi, Innovator.
5. Mr. Jamshed V. Rajan, C.P.O., Nimbuzz India.

Euphoria, one of the most popular and oldest bands in India, ended the journey of Techxetra 2012.

=== 2013 ===
TechXetra 2013 was organized from 25 to 27 October 2013 with more than 70 different events which included various technical, creative and cultural events. Techxetra 2013 was held on the theme of Water:Wherewithal with Wisdom to promote water conservation in accordance with United Nations' International Year of Water Cooperation.

The invited speakers in the lecture series were:

1. A CERN webinar with physicist Dr. Rolf Landua.
2. Juergen Reinhard, Life cycle Assessment specialist, EMPA, Technology and society unit, Switzerland.
3. Dr K Viswanathan, retired deputy director of Indian Space Research Organisation
4. Team Indus, a Delhi-based aerospace researched team.

Sycorax from Darjeeling was the headlining band in Metanoia. Bollywood singer Benny Dayal performed on the last night.

=== 2014 ===
TechXetra 2014 was scheduled from 17 October 2014 to 19 October 2014. There were various technical, cultural and creative events which were made a big success through active participation from over 100+ schools and colleges across the region. With the theme 'Bridging the digital divide', techXetra 2014 left a lasting impression on all who became a part of the fiesta. Social initiatives taken includes : Donations were made after collection of funds from various sources to Nabaprabhat orphanage at Tezpur, voter awareness rally conducted in collaboration with the Election Commission of India, a social up-gradation program with nearby school children based on the theme was conducted to introduce them to the benefits of internet and computers and more.

The notable speakers in the lecture series included :

1. Alok Mukherjee (DRDO) – Head of Robotics.
2. I.V. Rao : Maruti Suzuki – Managing Executive Officer.
3. Swati Sammadar: Corporate Affairs – Strategic relationship, South Asia at Intel Technology India Pvt. Ltd.

The cultural half of the fest was graced with performances of Yonsample, DJ Candice Redding at Sunburn and the fest concluded

with Parikrama performing before a crowd of over 6000.

=== 2015 ===
TechXetra 2015 was organised from 30 October 2015 to 1 November 2015. There were various events from all genres which experienced participation from all across the region. The theme for the year was "Empowering Peace and Security: A Tech-step Forward". The notable speakers of the lecture series included:

1. Prof.Jitendra Nath Goswami, Scientist
2. Mr. M.L. Stone, Entrepreneur
3. Mr. Uttam Kumar Mishra
4. Prof. D.N. Buragohain, Alumni, IIT Bombay

The cultural section of the festival saw performances from DJ Tejas and Underside headlining Metanoia. The final night concluded with a performance from Bollywood singer Aditi Singh Sharma.

=== 2016 ===
TechXetra 2016 was organised from 4 November 2016 to 6 November 2016. It saw participation from 100+ schools and 25,000+ footfalls. The theme for the year was "Ideas, Opportunities and Beyond". The notable speakers of the lecture series included:

1. Shombit Ghosh, Lieutenant Colonel, Indian Army
2. Uddhab Bharali, Innovator
3. Dr. Bindu Dey, DST
4. Professor Dr. Ramesh C. Deka, V.C., Assam Down Town University

The cultural section of the fest saw performances from DJ Berry Gangsta and Aberrant headlining Metanoia. The final night concluded with a performance from the popular band Astitva.

=== 2017 ===
TechXetra 2017 - Reboot, was the tenth edition of the techno-cultural fest, organized from 3 November 2017 to 5 November 2017.

It included workshops on Bluetooth Robotics, Game Development, Tall Building Design, Placement Grooming, Smart City Planning.

Various personalities like the notable author Adithya Iyer were invited.

Metanoia 2017 was headlined by the Pune-based band Noiseware. On the same night, modern post-rock band aswekeepsearching performed.

On 5 November, Raghu Dixit, the famous folk and fusion artist performed.

== See also ==
- Central University, India
- List of Engineering Colleges in Assam
