= Assam Science and Technology University =

State technical university in Jalukbari

- Type: State Technical University
- Established: 2010 (16 years ago)
- Chancellor: Governor of Assam
- Vice-Chancellor: Narendra S. Chaudhari
- Location: Jalukbari, Guwahati, Assam, India; 26°08′28″N 91°40′01″E
- Website: astu.ac.in

Assam Science and Technology University (ASTU) is a premier state technical university located in Jalukbari, Guwahati, Assam, India. It was established in 2010 by the Assam Government under the Assam Science and Technology University Act 2009. And has received NAAC accreditation B grade for its first time in 2025 .It is only the premier technical university in Northeast India.

The university has signed a collaborative partnership agreement with Curtin University in Perth, Western Australia to improve the higher education, mainly in the field of technology and research.

== Academics ==
Bachelor courses are typically four or three years of study.Master courses are typically two or three years.

Bachelor Courses-

- Bachelor of Technology/Bachelor of Engineering (B.Tech/ B.E)
- Bachelor of Pharmacy(B.Pharm)
- Bachelor of Pharmacy(B.Pharm. practice curriculum)
- Bachelor of Science(B.sc)
- Bachelor of Architecture(B.Arc)
- Bachelor of Business Administration (BBA)
- Bachelor of Computer Application (BCA)
- Bachelor of Design(B.Des)
- Bachelor of Tourism Management(BTM)

Master courses-

- Master of Technology(M.Tech)
- Master of Science (M.Sc)
- Master of Architecture(M.Arch)
- Master of Computer Applications (MCA)
- Master of Business Administration (MBA)- Trimester Mode
- Masters in Hospital Administration
- Ph.D in various Course

== Affiliated institutions ==
As of 2019, the institute has 18 affiliated institutions:

- Assam Engineering College, Guwahati
- Assam Institute of Management
- Barak Valley Engineering College, Karimganj
- Bineswar Brahma Engineering College
- Brahmaputra College
- Dhemaji Engineering College
- Girijananda Chowdhury Institute of Management and Technology, Tezpur
- Girijananda Chowdhury Institute of Pharmaceutical Science
- Golaghat Engineering College, Golaghat
- Guwahati College of Architecture
- Jorhat Engineering College, Jorhat
- Jorhat Institute of Science & Technology, Jorhat
- NETES Institute of Pharmaceutical Science, Mirza
- NETES Institute of Technology and Science, Mirza
- Pratiksha Institute of Pharmaceutical Sciences
- Scholar's Institute of Technology & Management

In addition, the Royal School of Engineering & Technology was affiliated until academic session 2016–17.

== Accreditation ==
The university is recognised by University Grants Commission(UGC) and AICTE.

== Notable people ==
- Tapan Das, Actor and film director
- Uddhab Bharali, Indian inventor & Mechanical Engineer.
- Tania Choudhury, Indian Bowler
- Dhrubajyoti Phukan, Musician, National film award winner
- Jayanta Madhab Bora, Assamese Novelist
- Neelim Mahanta, artist, Vlogger, YouTuber
- Utpal Borah, Member of the Assam Legislative Assembly (MLA)
- G.T. Dhungel, Politician
