= Neelim Mahanta =

Assamese activist and Graffiti artist

Living Art Neelim Mahanta
- Born: Lakhimpur, Assam
- Education: College of Art, Delhi; Guwahati College of Architecture
- Known for: Street Arts

Neelim Mahanta is an Indian artist, vlogger and activist from Lakhimpur, Assam. He is much known for his street art and graffiti.

Neelim's many artwork went viral in the social media.

== Personal life ==
Mahanta after completing his schooling from Lakhimpur enrolled in the Guwahati College of Architecture. After three years he took admission in the Delhi College of Arts in 2013. In 2016, he dropped out from the college, losing his degree, in his third year of the four-year course.

== Artistic works ==
In an interview, Mahanta mentioned that he created his first street art back in 2012 on the wall of a grocery store, in his neighbourhood.

Mahanta, after his studies started doing street art nearby, on the walls of Delhi. Then by the end of 2016, he started working for an organisation named Street Art India Foundation in Hyderabad.

After his return in Assam by the end of 2016, he along with his friends started painting on the walls of Assam, under the banner of Living Art which turned out to be so big that it became a creative movement of independent artists in Assam.

On 28 May 2019, On the occasion of World Menstrual Hygiene Day, Bidisha Saikia along with Neelim Mahanta installed a mural named “#BleedwithDignity” in the campus of Parijat Academy, Guwahati.

Moreover, in 2021 Government of Assam reached out to the Living Art group and Neelim to paint the walls of the newly constructed flyover in Dispur, which became viral in Social Media among the youngsters. Subsequently, after that he was also featured in the Music Video Silaa of Zubeen Garg.

== Controversies ==
On 27 March 2021, Mahanta along with a human rights lawyer Ebo Mili were arrested in Arunachal Pradesh for painting the boundary wall of the state secretariat. For which Zubeen Garg also shared a social media post to protest the arrest.

After a few days the duo was granted bail by a court in the Papum Pare district.
