= Arun Kumar Chanda =

Indian independence activist

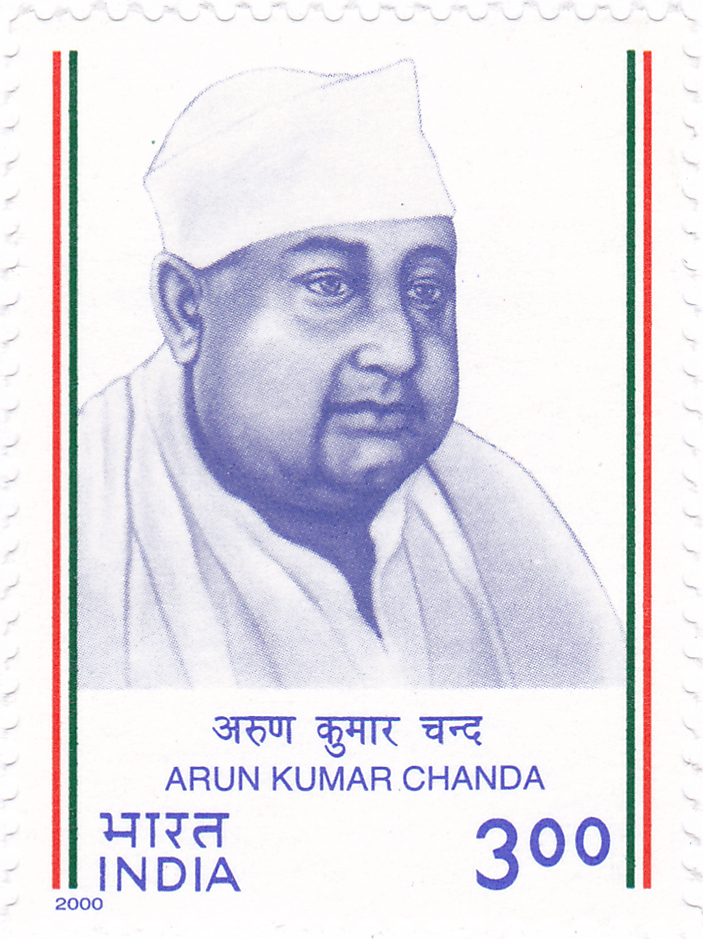
- Arun Kumar Chanda on a 2000 stamp of India
- Born: 17 February 1899; Silchar, Assam, India
- Died: 25 April 1947 (aged 48); Kolkata, West Bengal, India
- Occupations: Indian independence activist Social worker

Arun Kumar Chanda (Bengali: অরুণ কুমার চন্দ, romanized: Orun Kumar Chondo; 1899–1947) was an Indian independence activist from Cachar district of Assam. The Government of India issued a stamp in his honour. He was a social worker and writer who also edited the Bengali Weekly Saptak. In Silchar, a law college named A. K. Chanda Law College was established in 1960 in his memory.
