= Jayanta Madhab Bora =

Indian novelist

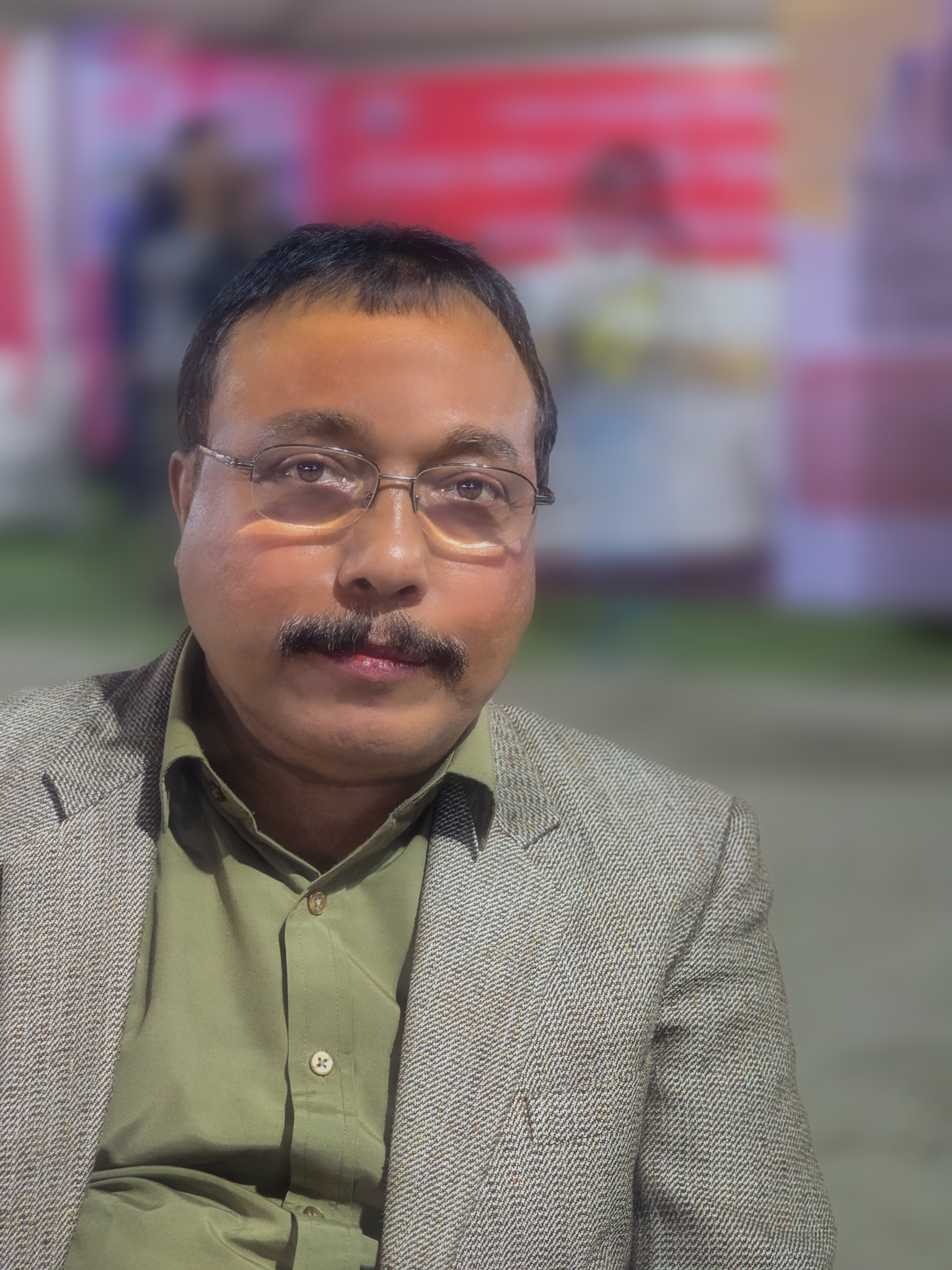
- Jayanata Madhab Bora at Assam Book Fair, 2025 in Guwahati
- Born: 19 August 1970 (age 56); Dergaon, Golaghat district
- Citizenship: Indian
- Education: Jorhat Science College; Dibrugarh University
- Occupations: Writer, novelist
- Writing career
- Language: Assamese language
- Notable work: Moriahola
- Notable awards: Sahitya Akademi Award in 2017 & B. R. Ambedkar Literature National Award in 2019

Jayanta Madhab Bora is an Assamese novelist who was awarded with the Sahitya Akademi Award in 2017 for Moriahola.

The novel is set against the backdrop of the hamlet Moriahola that got submerged in the Brahmaputra.The author did research on materials collected on the socio-economic crisis of the village and the villagers for 25 years from 1985.

== Awards and recognition ==
- 2017: Received Sahitya Akademi Award in 2017 for Moriahola
