= Regional Dental College, Guwahati =

Indian dental college

- আঞ্চলিক দন্ত চিকিৎসা মহাবিদ্যালয়
- Type: Public
- Established: 1982 (44 years ago)
- Affiliations: Gauhati University (before); Srimanta Sankaradeva University of Health Sciences (present); Dental Council of India
- Principal: Dr. A. C. Bhuyan
- Undergraduates: 50 per year
- Postgraduates: 10 per year
- Location: Bhangagarh Guwahati, Assam
- Campus: Urban
- Acronym: RDC
- Website: https://rdc.edu.in

Regional Dental College, Guwahati is an Indian government dental college under NEC. It was established in 1982 by NEC. It is the first dental college of North-East India. It is situated at Bhangagarh, Guwahati.

The college offers 5 year full-time degree course of Bachelor of Dental Surgery (BDS). After acquiring bachelor's degree in dentistry, candidates can also opt for master's degree in dentistry (MDS) in the same as the institute also stresses on the master level program of Dental sciences.

Initially the college was affiliated under Gauhati University. After establishment of first Health University of Assam, the college is under Srimanta Sankaradeva University of Health Sciences since 2011. Regional Dental College is recognized by Dental Council of India.

== Academics ==
The college offers 5year full-time undergraduate degree course of Bachelor of Dental Surgery. The admission into the BDS course was based on Assam-CEE and AIPMT till 2016. From 2017 it will be based on NEET. The college also offers Post graduate degree courses in Dental Science. All of the courses are under Srimanta Sankaradeva University of Health Sciences.

=== Courses ===
- Bachelor of Dental Surgery - 50 seats (increased in 2019 from 40 to 50) seat pear year
- Master of Dental Surgery - 10 seats
1. Periodontia - 2 seats
2. Operative Conservative Dentistry - 2 seats
3. Prosthodontics - 2 seats
4. Oral & Maxillofacial Surgery - 2 seats
5. Orthodontics and Dentofacial Orthopaedics - 2 seats
