= Girijananda Chowdhury Institute of Management and Technology, Tezpur =

Private institute in Tezpur, Assam, India

Coordinates: 26.681039°N 92.753898°E

- Motto: Truth, Discipline & Excellence
- Type: Private
- Established: 2011 (15 years ago)
- Affiliations: ASTU
- Principal: Buljit Buragohain
- Director: P. K. Brahma
- Location: Tezpur, Assam, India
- Campus: Sub urban
- Website: www.gimt-tezpur.ac.in

Girijananda Chowdhury Institute of Management and Technology, Tezpur (GIMT-Tezpur) is a private institute offering degree level technical courses in the State of Assam is a Private college established by Shrimanta Shankar Academy (SSA) Society and Government of Assam, India. The college was established with permission from the state government and approval from the All India Council for Technical Education (AICTE), New Delhi and is affiliated to Gauhati University (GU), Guwahati, Assam and also to Assam Science and Technology University (ASTU), Guwahati, Assam.

GIMT-Tezpur is the first institution established under Public-Private Partnership (PPP) mode in north eastern region of India.

== Affiliation ==
GIMT-Tezpur is affiliated to Assam Science and Technology University, Guwahati, Assam. All the undergraduate Bachelor of Technology (B.Tech) courses are recognized by the AICTE.

Previously, GIMT-Tezpur was affiliated to Gauhati University, Jalukbari, Guwahati (from 2011 to 2016).

== Academic programs ==
The GIMT-Tezpur undergraduate program is for Bachelor of Technology (B.Tech).

=== Undergraduate programmes ===
- GIMT-Tezpur offers four years Bachelor of Technology (B.Tech) course affiliated to Assam Science and Technology University in 4 branches that include Mechanical Engineering (60 seats), Civil Engineering (60 seats), Electrical Engineering (60 seats) and Electronics and Communication Engineering (60 seats) . The admission to the program is done through Common Entrance Exam (CEE) and Joint Entrance Examination (JEE) organised by Dibrugarh University and Central Board of Secondary Education (CBSE) respectively.
- For all courses, 18% seats are reserved for Government Quota.

[N.B. : Previously, GIMT-Tezpur had been offering four years Bachelor of Engineering (B.E.) course affiliated to Gauhati University in 4 branches that include Mechanical Engineering (60 seats), Civil Engineering (60 seats), Electrical Engineering (60 seats) and Electronics and Communication Engineering (60 seats) . The admission to the program is done through Common Entrance Exam (CEE) and Joint Entrance Examination (JEE) organised by Dibrugarh University and Central Board of Secondary Education (CBSE) respectively.]

== Departments and cells ==
=== Departments ===
To deal with the laboratory and practical components of the syllabi, the institute has 23 departmental laboratories.

==== Undergraduate departments ====
- Department of Civil Engineering (CE)
- Department of Electrical Engineering (EE)
- Department of Electronics and Communication Engineering (ECE)
- Department of Mechanical Engineering (ME)

==== Allied departments ====
- Department of Chemistry
- Department of Mathematics
- Department of Physics
- Department of Humanities and Social Science
- Department of Computer Science

=== Training and Placement Cell ===
Training and Placement Cell of GIMT-Tezpur is collaborated with the Training and Placement Cell of GIMT-Guwahati, with Mr. Sourabh Mazinder Baruah as the Training and Placement Officer.

== Facilities ==
=== Transport ===
GIMT-Tezpur runs college bus service along specified routes from the Tezpur city to the Institute campus. The arrangement will be continued as long as deemed necessary.

=== Canteen ===
A well equipped canteen is housed in a spacious building providing hygienic breakfast, lunch, tea and snacks to students, faculty and staff members at moderate rates.

=== Hostel ===
The institute has one boy's hostel known as GIMT-Tezpur Boy's Hostel within the campus having the total capacity of 170 seats. Rooms are double bedded. The hostel is well maintained and equipped with the facilities such as 24 hours running water supply and electricity, homely environment and hygienic food, WiFi etc. The institute has no Girl's Hostel of its own but there are 7 (Seven) girl's hostel nearby the institute campus authorized by GIMT-Tezpur. The hostels are single/double bedded and vigilance undertaken by a strong committee of the institute regularly.

== Scholarships ==
- 18% seats are available for Government Quota (more than 90% tuition fees waiver).
- Merit based Scholarships.

- 50% fees waiver for students having 90% and above in Physics, Chemistry and Mathematics in 10+2 level examinations.
- 50,000/- INR fees waiver for students having 80% and above in Physics, Chemistry and Mathematics in 10+2 level examinations.

- Government Scholarships for ST, SC, OBC, and Minority.
- North East Council Scholarship (NEC).

== Extracurricular ==
=== Annual festival ===
Avante Coureur (AC) is the institute's annual fest which is held in the month of January every year. It was first celebrated in the year 2012 with a very limited number of faculty and staff and the first batch of students. Thereafter, GIMT-Tezpur family conducts the college fest every year which witnesses active participation of both students and staff of the institute. The festival organises a number of outdoor and indoor sports, tournaments, computer gaming, girls’ special competitions, literary and cultural competitions both at inter and intra-college level. Besides these, other regional artists and bands are also invited to perform at the event.

=== Annual magazine ===
GIMTIAN

=== Photography club ===
A photography club named as ‘ZOOMERSZIG’ has been formed in GIMT-Tezpur on 28 February 2016 to give a platform to the budding photography talents of GIMT fraternity. The club was inaugurated on the day of National Science day by Dr. Ramesh Chandra Goswami. On that occasion, a photography exhibition was conducted in the college premises and various photographs captured by the students and faculty members were displayed.

=== Ethnic Day Celebration ===
India is a multi-religious, multi-lingual and multi-cultural country. In order to maintain unity in diversity in the country it becomes one's moral responsibility to respect the traditions and recognize the culture of the others. Every tradition or culture has its own uniqueness and beauty. With the aim to inculcate the feeling of respect for all the traditions and cultures, GIMT-Tezpur organises "Ethnic Day" on 3rd week of April every year.

== Sister institutes ==
- Girijananda Chowdhury Institute of Management and Technology, Guwahati - the first self-financing private Engineering and Management Institute in north eastern region of India.
- Girijananda Chowdhury Institute of Pharmaceutical Science (GIPS) - the first self-financing private Pharmacy Institute in north eastern region of India offering Bachelor of Pharmacy
- Shrimanta Shankar Academy, Panbazar - affiliated to Assam Higher Secondary Education Council (AHSEC)
- Shrimanta Shankar Academy, Dispur - affiliated to Central Board of Secondary Education (CBSE)
