= Dhemaji Engineering College =

Engineering college in Assam, India

Dhemaji Engineering College (DEC)
- ধেমাজি অভিযান্ত্ৰিক মহাবিদ্যালয়
- Other name: DEC
- Motto: सा विद्या या विमुक्तये
- Motto in English: Education is that which liberate us.
- Type: Undergraduate Public Engineering College
- Established: 22nd February 2020 (6 years ago)
- Academic affiliations: Assam Science and Technology University
- Principal: Dr. Dilip Kumar Bora
- Undergraduates: 744
- Location: Dhemaji, Assam, India; 27.517634°N 94.484639°E
- Campus: Rural
- Approvals: AICTE
- Website: dec.ac.in

Dhemaji Engineering College (DEC) was established by the Government of Assam on 22nd February 2020, in an effort to expand technical education to the Northeast regions of India. It is a public institute located in Tekjuri, within the Dhemaji district of Assam. The physical college campus was formally inaugurated on 22nd February 2021 by Prime Minister Narendra Modi during a public ceremony in Assam. The Institute offers undergraduate Bachelor of Technology (B.Tech) degrees in Civil Engineering, Mechanical Engineering, and Computer Science & Engineering. It is the seventh state government engineering college in Assam, accredited by the All India Council for Technical Education and affiliated to Assam Science and Technology University.

== Academic structure and admissions ==
Students may be admitted to the institute through the annually held CEE examinations. The college offers B.Tech programs in Mechanical, Civil, and Computer Science & Engineering, and is affiliated with Assam Science and Technology University. It is also approved and accredited by the All India Council for Technical Education.

== Affiliation ==
The undergraduate courses, Bachelor of Technology affiliated to Assam Science and Technology University, are approved by All India Council for Technical Education New Delhi.

== Academics ==
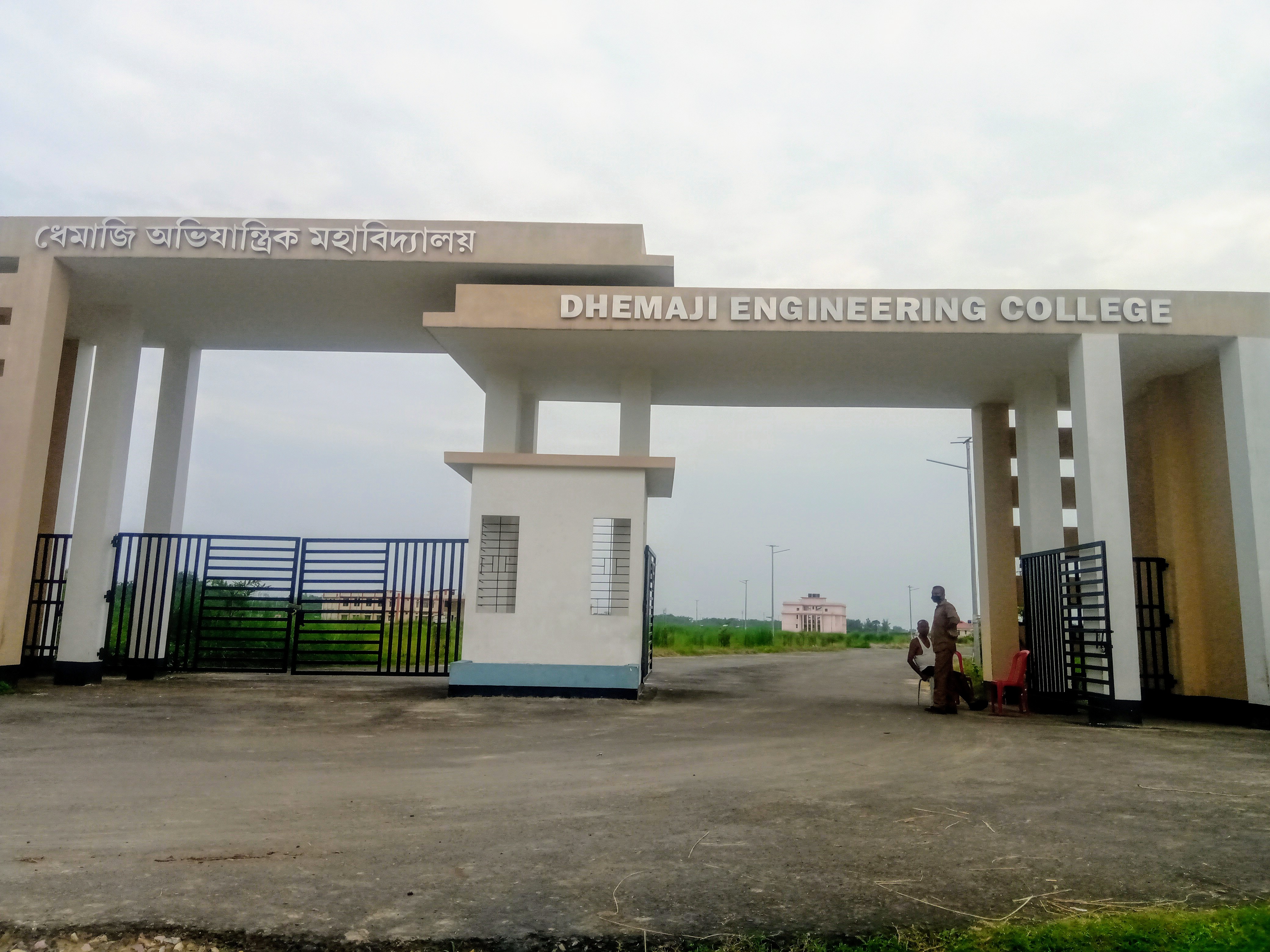
Entrance gate of DEC

The college offers four-year B.Tech degree in Computer Science and Engineering, Civil Engineering and Mechanical Engineering affiliated to Assam Science and Technology University.

Department	Duration	Seat
Computer Science and Engineering	4 years	60
Civil Engineering	4 years	60
Mechanical Engineering	4 years	60

== Admissions ==
- Students are taken in for the undergraduate courses through the Assam Combined Entrance Examination (CEE) conducted by the Assam Science and Technology University.
- Lateral entry into the undergraduate courses are done through the Joint Lateral Entrance Examination (JLEE) conducted by Assam Science and Technology University

== Facilities ==
=== Hostels ===
The college has three undergraduate (B.Tech.) hostels, for both boys and girls. These have basic facilities such as a common room, a dining hall, and a recreation room, along with Internet connectivity.

=== Guest House ===
A College Guest House is present, coupled with a playground for outside-college guests.

=== Canteen ===
The college has two canteens, one inside the Academic Building and one within the Guest House.

=== Bus Services ===
Bus services commenced from August 2025.

== Clubs ==
- Innovation Club
- Robotics & Coding Club
- Google Developer Groups (GDG)
- Cultural Club
- Literary Club
- Sports Club
- ECO Club
- NSS Club

== College Festivals ==
ARCANIX is the premier techno-cultural festival of Dhemaji Engineering College.

== Training and Placement cell ==
The Training and Placement Cell of the college plays a pivotal role in bridging the gap between industry and academia. The Training and Placement cell of the college helps students with training programs, group discussions, mock interviews, and online tests to prepare them for the industry. The college has also signed MoUs with several organisations like TRTC, Assam Startup, NPTI, Access Skill Edutech Pvt. Ltd., Aartees Education Incorporated etc.

Major recruiters include IBM, PwC, LTM (previously LTIMindtree), Cognizant, TCS, NRL, C-DAC, RDC Concrete, MRF Tyres, Vikas Group, Intellipaat, and Ediglobe.

== Connectivity to Dhemaji Engineering College ==
By Road - NH 15 offers easy access to Dhemaji Engineering College, connecting it to major towns, with local roads providing convenient campus access.

By Train - Dhemaji Railway Station, about 12 km from Dhemaji Engineering College, offers easy campus access via private rentals and public transport.

By Air - Dibrugarh Airport, about 74 km away, and Lakhimpur Airport, around 65 km from Dhemaji Engineering College, are the nearest airports. Taxis and buses are available for easy travel to the campus from both locations. College bus services are also going to be available very soon.
