= A. K. Chanda Law College =

Law college in Assam

A. K. Chanda law College
- Parent school: Assam University
- Religious affiliation: Non-religion
- Established: 1960 (66 years ago)
- School type: Public
- Location: Silchar, Assam, India; 24.829009059494904°N 92.79188985934685°E

A. K. Chanda Law College better known as AKCLC is a law school situated at Tarapur, Silchar, in Cachar district in the Indian state of Assam. It offers 3 years LL.B. course affiliated to Assam University. This college is recognised by Bar Council of India (BCI), New Delhi.

== History ==
A. K. Chanda Law college was established in 1960 in memoirs of freedom fighter and social worker Arun Kumar Chanda.

== See also ==
- Assam University
