= Barak Valley Engineering College =

Engineering college in India

- Other name: BVEC
- Motto: Making Excellence and innovation built into every design
- Motto in English: Minds towards innovation
- Type: Engineering college
- Established: 2017 (9 years ago)
- Affiliations: Assam Science and Technology University
- Principal: Dr. Diganta Goswami
- Undergraduates: 240 (per year)
- Location: Nirala, Sribhumi, Assam, India
- Campus: Rural
- Approvals: AICTE
- Website: www.bvec.ac.in

Barak Valley Engineering College (BVEC) is a state government engineering college located in Sribhumi, Assam. It was established on 14 August 2017 by Assam Government at Sribhumi district, Assam. It is affiliated to Assam Science and Technology University. On 2 March 2011, Chief Minister Tarun Gogoi laid the foundation stone of the Barak Valley Engineering College in Sribhumi district, which was proposed by the Assam Government officially.

The college started to offer B.Tech degree in Computer Science and Engineering and Electronics and Telecommunication Engineering from the academic year 2017–18. It is the fifth state government engineering college of Assam and first in Barak Valley.

== History ==
In 2009, the Government of Assam took the first move to set up the college. In 2017, the government started its full-fledged operation of the college under the influence of Directorate of Technical Education (DTE), Assam. The college is fully funded by the Government.

== Affiliation ==
The college is affiliated to Assam Science and Technology University. All the undergraduate courses Bachelor of Technology is approved by the All India Council for Technical Education (AICTE), New Delhi, Govt of India.

== Academics ==
The college offers Bachelor of Technology (B.Tech) courses in various fields:

== Courses ==
Engineering Department

- Department of Computer Science & Engineering.

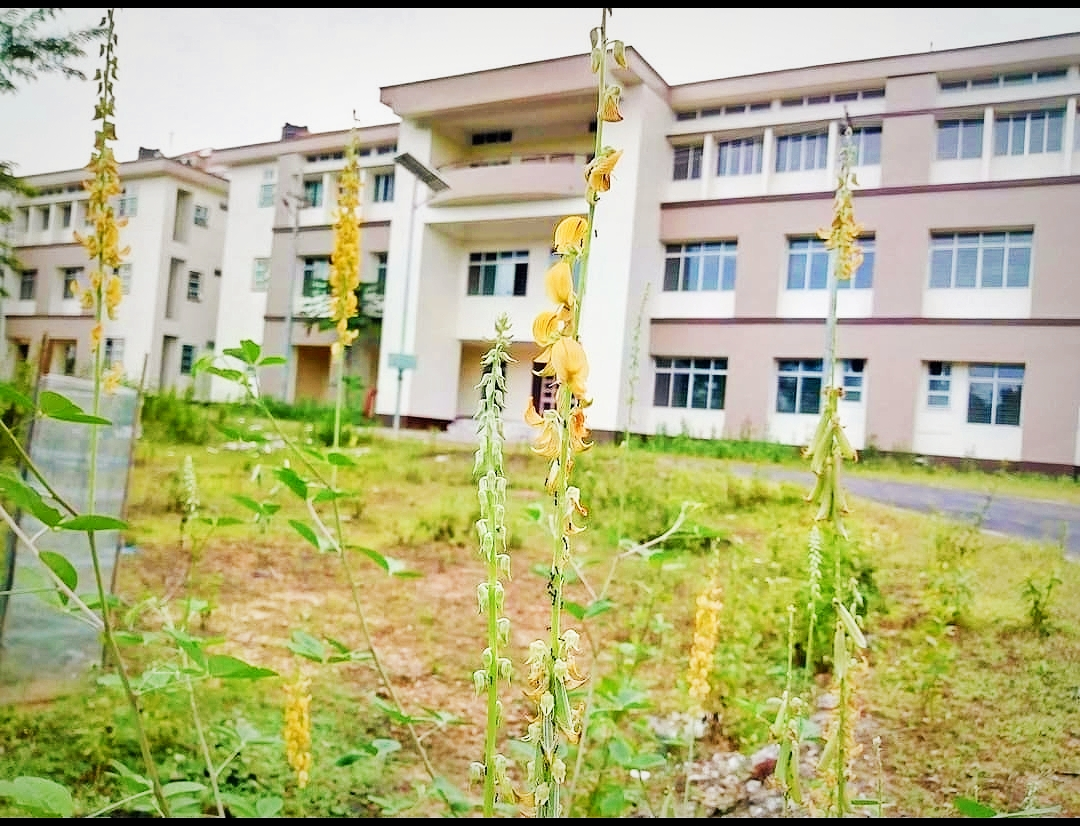
Department building _CSE

The Department of Computer Science and Engineering was started in April, 2017.The annual intake capacity is 60 students. The department has a computer centre.

- Department of Electronics and Telecommunication Engineering
- Department of Mechanical Engineering
- Department of Civil Engineering

Non-engineering department

- Physics
- Chemistry
- Mathematics
- Humanities

== Admissions ==
- Students are taken in for undergraduate (B.Tech) courses through Assam Combined Entrance Examination (CEE) conducted by ASTU.
- Lateral entry into the undergraduate (B.Tech) courses is done through the Joint Lateral Entrance Examination (JLEE) conducted by ASTU.

== Facilities ==
=== Hostels ===
There are three hostels on the campus, one for boys and two for girls, with a combined capacity of 120 boarders.

=== College canteen ===
The college's canteen is located in the main building.

== Bvec ansel photography ==
- BVEC ANSEL PHOTOGRAPHY
  BVEC ANSEL Photography

== Extracurricular activities and clubs ==
- BVEC Quiz club
- BVEC Coding Club.
- Resplandor Tech festival
- Intensity
- Techflare

== Training and placement cell ==
The training and placement cell of the college looks after the internship training and campus interviews of the students.
