= Government Model College Deithor =

- Established: 2020
- Location: Deithor, Deopahar, Karbi Anglong, Numaligarh, Assam, India
- Website: http://www.gmcdeithor.ac.in/

Government Model College Deithor is situated in Deithor(Labanghat -Deithor Road)near Deopahar Numaligarh in the Bokajan Legislative assembly of Karbi Anglong district of Assam in India.The College is just 1.2 km away from the NH39. It is the second government college after Diphu Government College and first Model Degree College of Karbi Anglong district established under Rastriya Uchahtar Siksha Abhiyan (RUSA) of the Directorate of Higher Education, Government of Assam. It is affiliated to Dibrugarh University, Dibrugarh, Assam.
