= Defence Research Laboratory =

Indian defence laboratory

- Established: 1962
- Field of research: Defense and development studies
- Director: Dr. Dev Vrat Kamboj
- Location: Tezpur, Assam, India; 26.65475°N 92.791146°E
- Operating agency: DRDO
- Website: https://www.drdo.gov.in/labs-and-establishments/defence-research-laboratory-drl
- Location within Assam Location within India

The Defence Research Laboratory (DRL) is a defence laboratory of the Defence Research and Development Organisation (DRDO) located in Tezpur city of Assam state of India. It conducts research and development studies on vector-borne diseases, improving the quality of drinking water, waste biodegradation and management.

== History ==
In 2020, with an intent to make the DRDO leaner and more effective, it was proposed to merge the Defence Institute of Bio-Energy Research (DIBER), Defence Institute of High Altitude Research (DIHAR), and "Defence Research Laboratory" (DRL). The collaboration with the Defence Food Research Laboratory and the Central Food Technological Research Institute of the Council of Scientific and Industrial Research (CSIR) will be enhanced.

== Organisation ==
DRL is headed by a director. The present director of DRL is Dr Dev Vrat Kamboj.

== See also ==
- Defence industry of India
