= Golaghat Engineering College =

College in Assam, India

Coordinates: 26.5566°N 93.9660°E

- Other name: GEC
- Motto: ज्ञान निष्ठा परिश्रमेन प्रसरनु
- Established: 2018 (8 years ago)
- Academic affiliations: Assam Science and Technology University
- Undergraduates: 180 (per year)
- Location: Bogorijeng, Golaghat, Assam, India
- Campus: Rural
- Website: www.gecassam.ac.in

Golaghat Engineering College was established in 2018 by Assam Government at Golaghat district, Assam. On 31 March 2012, Chief Minister Tarun Gogoi laid the foundation stone of the Golaghat Engineering College in Golaghat district, which was proposed by the Assam Government officially. It was officially inaugurated by chief minister, Sarbananda Sonowal on 5 February 2019.

The college starts to offer BTech degree from academic year 2018–19. The college is accredited by All India Council for Technical Education (AICTE) The institution is affiliated to Assam Science and Technology University

It is the sixth state government engineering college of Assam.

== Academics ==
The college offers four year B.Tech degree in Civil engineering, Chemical engineering and Mechanical engineering affiliated to Assam Science and Technology University.

Department	Duration	Seat
Civil engineering	4 year	60
Chemical engineering	4 year	60
Mechanical engineering	4 year	60

== Non-Engineering ==
- Mathematics
- Chemistry
- Physics
- Humanities

=== Admissions ===
- Students are taken in for the undergraduate courses through Assam Combined Entrance Examination (CEE) conducted by Assam Science and Technology University.
- For lateral entry into the undergraduate courses are done through the Joint Lateral Entrance Examination(JLEE) conducted by Assam Science and Technology University.

== Controversy ==
In May 2019, Golaghat Engineering College was denied approval by the All India Council for Technical Education (AICTE) due to failure to meet 17 eligibility criteria, including the absence of a permanent principal and faculty members. The college, inaugurated in February 2019, faced resource shortages. Despite this, the 92 enrolled students were allowed to continue their studies.
