= Girijananda Chowdhury University =

Private university in Assam

- Type: Private
- Established: 17 October 2022
- Affiliations: UGC
- Chancellor: Jayanta Deka
- Vice-Chancellor: Kandarpa Das
- Visitor: Governor of Assam
- Location: Azara, Guwahati, India
- Campus: Urban
- Website: https://gcuniversity.ac.in/

Girijananda Chowdhury University is a private university in Guwahati, Assam, established by cabinet decision of Assam Legislative Assembly under Assam Act XLVII of 2022. The university has been set up under the aegis of the Shrimanta Shankar Academy (SSA) Society, a leading social organization in Assam that promotes the teachings of the great Assamese saint Shrimanta Shankar Dev.

== Overview ==
The core ideal of GCU is imbibed in its motto of Enhancing Equity and Empathy with Empowerment. The University emerged through the culmination of the Girijananda Institute of Management and Technology (GIMT) and the Girijananda Institute of Pharmaceutical Sciences (GIPS) to impart professional higher education in a spirit of philanthropy and social commitment. GCU received approval from the University Grants Commission (UGC) under section 2(f) on 24 November 2022.

== Campus ==
The main campus of GCU is located at Azara, Guwahati on the Lokapriya Gopinath Bordoloi International Airport road and covers an area of 20 acres. The university has a constituent campus at Dekargaon, Tezpur, which accommodates the state's 1st PPP (Public Private Partnership) pharmacy institute (GIPS-Tezpur) and sprawls across an area of 66 acres.

== Governance ==
Shri Lakshman Acharya, Governor of Assam is the Visitor of Girijananda Chowdhury University. Prof. Jayanta Deka is the Chancellor and Prof. Kandarpa Das is the Vice Chancellor of GCU.

== Academics ==
The Girijananda Chowdhury University, Assam began its academic journey in the year 2023-2024 as a Multidisciplinary Teaching-Intensive University and aspires to become a Research-Intensive Multidisciplinary University over the years. The university currently offers undergraduate, postgraduate and doctoral studies across different disciplines under its specialized schools of-

- Engineering and Technology
- Management and Commerce
- Pharmaceutical Sciences
- Humanities and Social Sciences
- Natural Sciences
- Allied Health Sciences
- Centre for Legal Studies

Presently, B. Tech (Mechanical Engineering) and B. Pharm programmes of the University are accredited by the National Board of Accreditation (NBA). The University has also received approval from AICTE (All India Council for Technical Education) and PCI (Pharmacy Council of India) respectively for its programmes in Engineering, Computer Applications, Management and Pharmacy.

PhD admissions at GCU are made through the Research Entrance Test (GCU-RET) and for UG and PG programmes, the Girijananda Chowdhury University Common Admission Test (GCU-CAT) is conducted. Diploma and certificate courses are also offered by the university in different domains.

Girijananda Chowdhury University is the first University in North-eastern India to have established a fully-functional AICTE-IDEA Lab.
