= Bineswar Brahma Engineering College =

Government college in Kokrajhar, Assam, India

- Type: Public
- Established: 2008 (18 years ago)
- Affiliations: Assam Science and Technology University
- Principal: Kamal Kr. Brahma
- Location: Kokrajhar, Kokrajhar district, BTAD, Assam
- Campus: Sub urban
- Approvals: AICTE
- Website: www.bbec.ac.in

Bineswar Brahma Engineering College is a government college, established in 2008 by the Assam Government at Kokrajhar district, Assam. In 2006 Assam Government announced that an engineering college would be set up at Kokrajhar. The college is situated in a village called Chandrapara, which is 5 km from Kokrajhar town. The engineering college is named after the prominent leader of Bodo community and former president of Bodo Sahitya Sabha Bineswar Brahma.

== Location ==
Bineswar Brahma Engineering College is situated at Chandrapara, a village which is 5 km from Kokrajhar town.

== Academics ==
The college offers 4-year Bachelor of Engineering courses.

Department	Duration	Seat
Civil Engineering	4 year	60
Chemical Engineering	4 year	60
Electrical Engineering	4 year	60
Mechanical Engineering	4 year	60

== Admissions ==
- Students are taken in for the undergraduate courses through Combined Entrance Examination (CEE) conducted by Assam Science and Technology University.
- For lateral entry into the undergraduate courses are done through the Joint Lateral Entrance Examination(JLEE) conducted by the Director of Technical Education, Assam.

== Facilities ==
=== Computer Center ===
The Computer Center (CC) in BBEC which caters to the needs of academic departments and various sections of the institute. CC is facilitated with high speed NKN internet connectivity with separate sitting arrangement for Students & Staff.

=== Library ===
The College has a well maintained Library with adequate books & staff. There also are excellent study arrangements for students and faculties.

=== Canteen ===
College canteen is available with well maintained.

=== Medical ===
The College has sufficient medical facility with professional team.

=== Bus ===
The College is providing sufficient bus services for the students & staff with the help of Bodoland Transport Services.

=== Sports ===
The college is providing sufficient assistance to boost-up students’ sports spirit. And also, providing adequate sports materials for the same.

== Festival ==
There is an annual festival called Technisia which is held here. Mainly various competitions related to technology and culture take place in this festival. Apart from these various debates and robotic workshops are also held in this festival.

== Training and Placement ==
The training and placement cell of this college looks after the internship training and campus interviews of the students.
