= Central Institute of Technology, Kokrajhar =

University in India

- Motto: Asato ma sadgamaya, Tamaso ma jyotirgamaya
- Type: Deemed University
- Established: 2006; 20 years ago
- Chairman: Nishikant V. Despande
- Director: Devendra Jalihal (additional charge)
- Location: Kokrajhar, Kokrajhar district, Assam; 26°28′41″N 90°18′09″E
- Campus: Urban
- Website: www.cit.ac.in

The Central Institute of Technology Kokrajhar (CITK) is a public technical institute established in 2006 and owned by the Government of India. It is located in Kokrajhar, Assam, India. The institute is spread across 300 acres (1.2 km^{2}) in Kokrajhar and offers Bachelor of Technology (B.Tech.), Bachelor of Design (B.Des.), Master of Technology (M.Tech.), Master of Design (M.Des.), PhD, and Diploma programs in various disciplines.

== History ==
The Institute was established on 19 December 2006. The genesis of this Institute was the memorandum of Settlement on Bodoland Territorial Council (BTC) signed between the Assam Government, the Government of India and the Bodo Liberation Tigers Force, on 10 February 2003, in New Delhi. The Institute is an autonomous body registered under the Societies Registration Act, 1860 and functions under a Board of Governors (BOG). The Institute was declared a Deemed University by the University Grants Commission (UGC) and the Ministry of Human Resource Development (MHRD), a recommendation from the Central Government under the "De-Novo" category on 13 December 2018.

== Departments ==
The institute has the following departments offering both diploma and degree programs:

- Civil engineering
- Computer Science & Engineering
- Electronics & Communication Engineering
- Food Engineering and Technology
- Instrumentation Engineering
- Multimedia Communication and Design
- Allied Engineering
- Basic Science
- Humanities and Social Science

== Facilities ==
There are 3 Boys' and 1 Girl Hostel and one Transit Hostel inside the campus with the capacity to accommodate around 1100 Boys and 250 girls. However to accommodate the newly admitted girls the institute has arranged 2 rented houses outside the campus and new Hostels are being constructed. Due to the constraints faced by the students especially the outstation students to find accommodation in the town, the Institute is making arrangements for opening more hostels for both boys and girls.
