= Indian Institute of Management Guwahati =

Management school in India

- Bhāratīya Prabaṃdha Saṃsthāna Guwahati (Hindi - IAST)
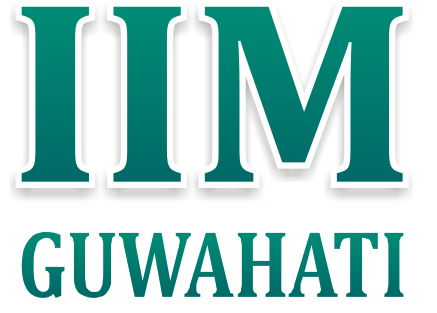
- Other names: IIMG or IIM Guwahati
- Type: Public, business school (INI)
- Established: August 2025; 10 months ago
- Affiliations: Autonomous
- Location: Guwahati, Assam, India
- Language: English
- Website: www.iimg.ac.in

The Indian Institute of Management Guwahati (IIM Guwahati or IIM-G) is a public business school located in Guwahati, Assam, India. Established in 2025 through the Indian Institutes of Management (Amendment) Bill, 2025, it is the 22nd institution to be added under the Indian Institutes of Management (Amendment) Bill, 2025, granting it the status of an Institution of National Importance.

== Background ==
The establishment of IIM Guwahati is part of a broader initiative to enhance educational infrastructure in the north-eastern region of India. The Union Cabinet approved the bill to set up the institute, marking it as the second IIM in the Northeast after IIM Shillong, which was established in 2007. The central government has committed an investment of ₹555 crore over five years (2025–2030) for the development of the institution.

IIM Guwahati will be mentored by IIM Ahmedabad and is set to commence its academic session in the current year. Initially, classes will be held at a temporary campus provided by the state, with plans for a permanent campus in Palasbari, Kamrup district. The establishment of IIM Guwahati is expected to foster regional development by attracting talent and fostering economic growth in the Northeast.

== See also ==
- Indian Institutes of Management
- Indian Institute of Management Bangalore
