= Jorhat Institute of Science and Technology =

Engineering college in Jorhat, India

- Motto: Yogaḥ karmasu kauśalam
- Motto in English: Excellence in Action is Yoga
- Type: Government Engineering College
- Established: 1971 (55 years ago)
- Affiliations: Assam Science and Technology University
- Principal: Dr. Mrinal Buragohain
- Undergraduates: 504 (per year)
- Postgraduates: 77 (per year)
- Location: Jorhat, Assam, India; 26.782422°N 94.294162°E
- Campus: Rural
- Acronym: JIST
- Approvals: AICTE
- Website: jist.ac.in

Jorhat Institute of Science and Technology, formerly Jorhat Science College is an engineering college established in 1971 by the government of Assam. It is located in Sotai, on the outskirts of Jorhat city. It is the first science college of Upper Assam and the third state-government-run engineering college of Assam. It is affiliated to Assam Science and Technology University. It is also the only government engineering college of Assam which offers both engineering and basic science courses.

== History ==
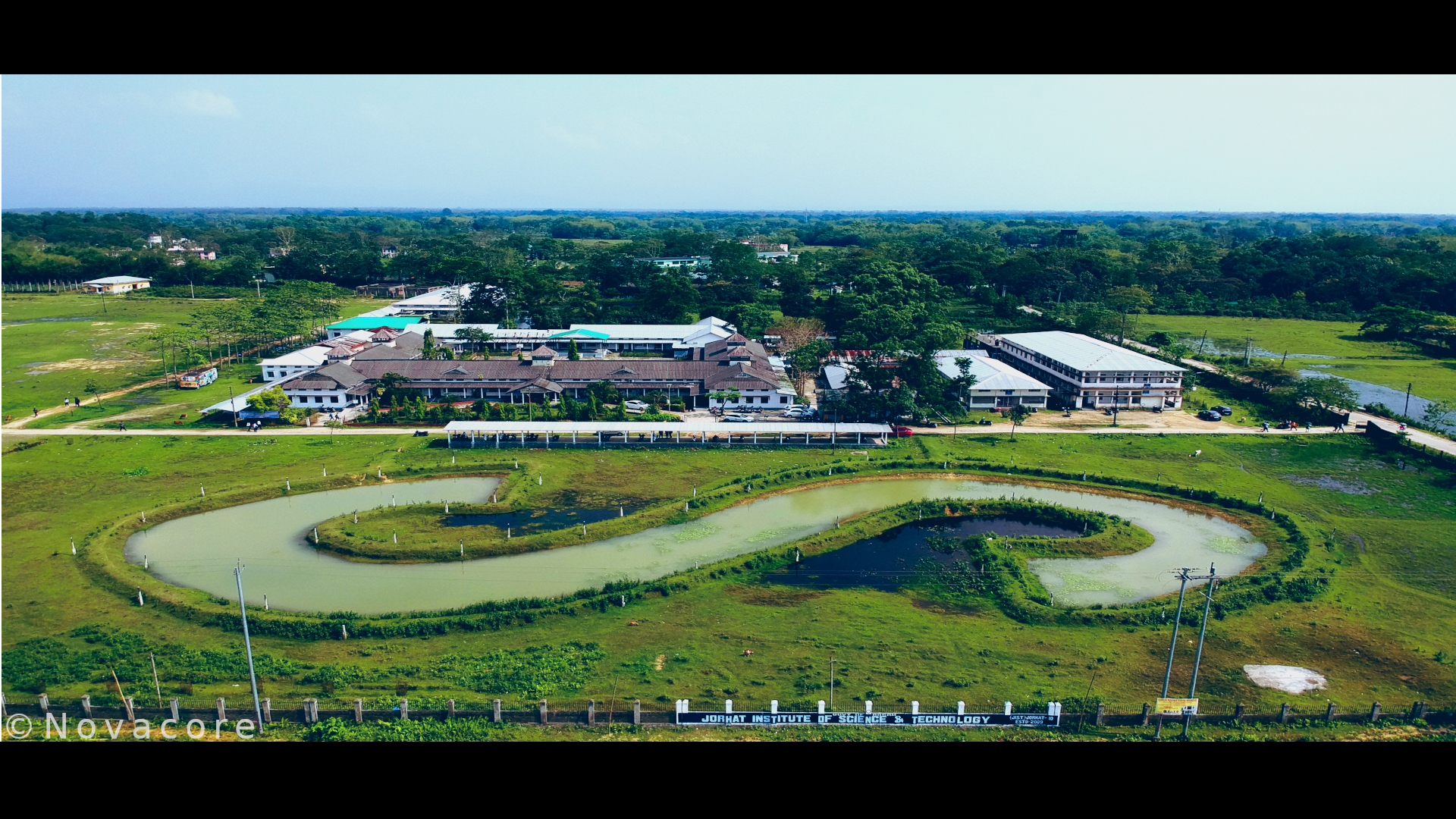
JIST - Bird's Eye View (Front)

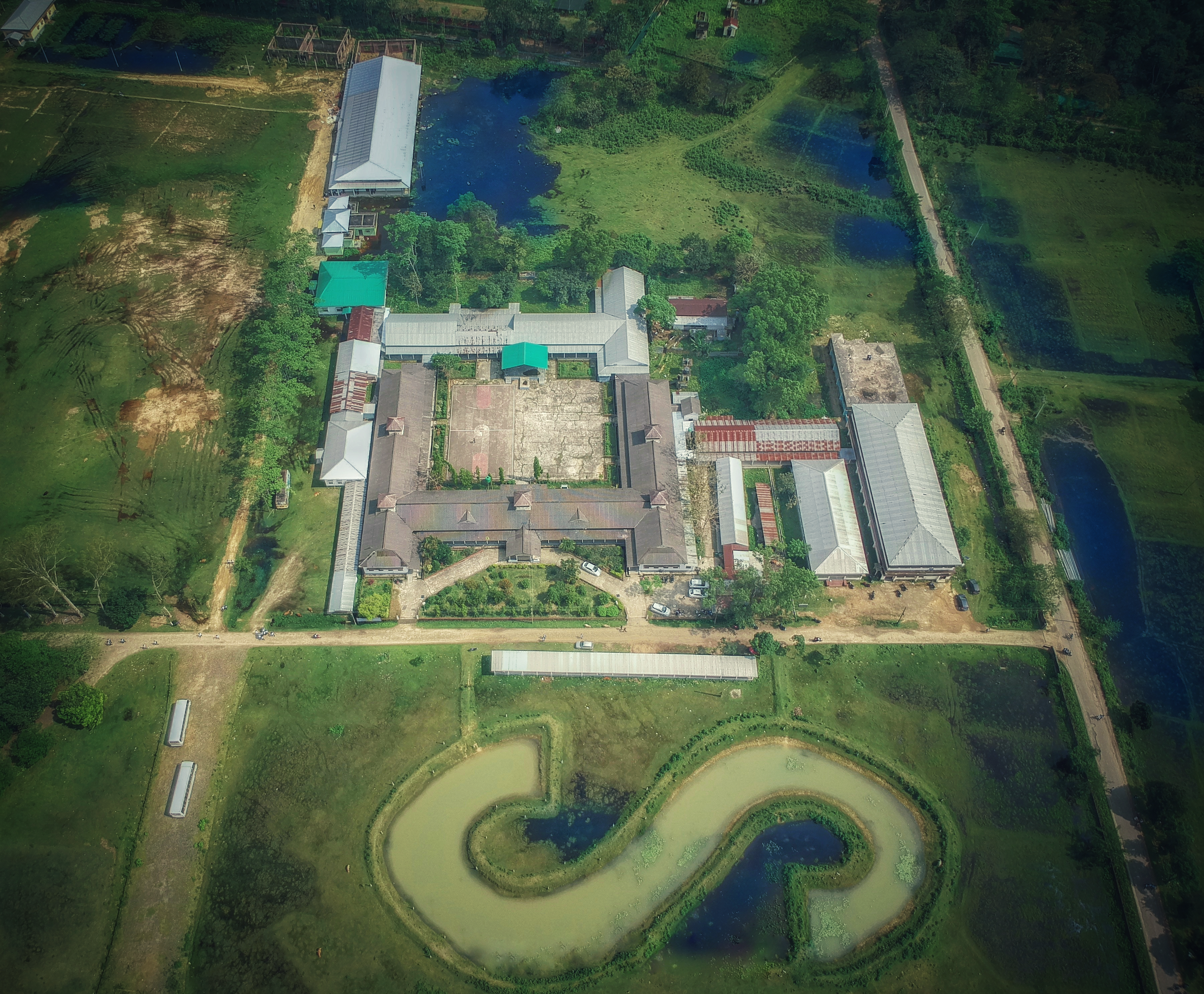
Another aerial view of JIST (Top)

Jorhat Science College was established by Govt. of Assam in 1971. In 2008, the Government of Assam upgraded the college and renamed it as Jorhat Institute of Science & Technology registered under the Societies Registration Act, 1860.

The college until then was offering only undergraduate courses in subjects of Science (Honours in Physics, Chemistry and Mathematics). From the academic session 2007-08, a three-year degree course, B.Sc. in Information Technology (IT) was introduced with an intake capacity of 30. From the academic session 2009-10, two technical courses, B.E. in Electronics & Telecommunication (ETC) and Power Electronics & Instrumentation (PEI), were introduced, in addition to the existing B.Sc. courses, with prior approval from AICTE, with an intake of 60 seats in each course. From 2016 onwards, the institute offers B.E. course in Mechanical and Civil Engineering. With the change of affiliation from Dibrugarh University (DU) to Assam Science and Technology University (ASTU), from the session 2017-18, the previous B.E. courses have been changed to B.Tech along with changes in curricula and grading system.

== Academics ==
The college offers bachelor's courses: Bachelor of Science in Physics, Chemistry, Mathematics and Information Technology, and Bachelor of Technology in the fields of Electronics & Telecommunication Engineering, Power Electronics & Instrumentation Engineering. From academic year 2016-17, the institute has started offering M.Sc. in Physics and Mathematics and B.Tech. in Civil Engineering and Mechanical Engineering. From the academic session 2017-18, JIST introduced M.Sc. in Chemistry with the approval of Dibrugarh University. In 2019, the institution has started PhD courses in Physics, Chemistry and Mathematics with the approval of ASTU.

Formerly, all the courses were affiliated to Dibrugarh University until 2017. From 2017-18 session, the institute is affiliated to Assam Science and Technology University.

== Departments ==
=== Engineering departments ===
- Electronics and Telecommunication Engineering
- Power Electronics and Instrumentation Engineering
- Civil Engineering
- Mechanical Engineering

=== Non-Engineering departments ===
- Information Technology
- Physics
- Mathematics
- Chemistry
- Humanities and Social Science

== Facilities ==
=== Computer lab ===
The college has a modern computational laboratory with the facilities of many branded PCs connected with each other through LAN. Each core department has its own computing facilities.

=== Hostels ===
At present JIST has two boys' hostels and two girls' hostel. The total strength of the boys' hostels is 240 and that of the girls' hostel is 150. Construction of a new hostel is likely to be started. Private hostels and accommodations are also available near the institute campus.

CAFES Boys' Hostel and New Girls' Hostel are only for 1st year students.

All the hostels are connected with WI-FI wireless network with 24 x 7 internet facility.

=== Library ===
JIST has a well-maintained library with more than 11,000 books on different subjects (curriculum and non-curriculum) catering to the needs of the students and teachers. The library is also furnished with scientific journals, monthly magazines and daily newspapers for in-house reading.

=== Canteen ===
A college canteen is available with freshly prepared food during breakfast and lunch. It remains open during events at college even if it's not an official working day.

=== Health Center ===
The college has a Dispensary with a Doctor (presently vacant), a nurse and a pharmacist within the campus for First-Aid and emergency treatment.

=== Bus Services ===
JIST provides for the transportation needs of the students and staff with three buses that run through the heart of Jorhat city.

== Student Activity Centre ==
JIST focuses on integrating knowledge, skills, and attitudes in students, preparing them to excel in the diverse environments of India and beyond while keeping societal and environmental considerations in mind. The Student Activity Centre (SAC) at JIST offers a space for students to express their innovative ideas, talents, and cultural interests, enabling them to reach their full potential. Various clubs within the SAC allow students to venture into new territories and perform at their best.

- Tinkering Lab
- Electronics Hobby Club
- Robotics Club
- Entrepreneurship Cell (E-Cell)
- Google Developer Students Club (GDSC)
- JIST Coding Club
- JIST Anime Club
- JIST Cultural and Welfare Society
- JIST Literary and Symposium Society

== Training & Placement Cell ==
The Training & Placement Cell of JIST handles the task of campus recruitment for its graduating students and was established in 2010. Its tasks involve establishing contacts with companies, conducting workshops for the students to train them on technical and non-technical aspects, conducting preliminary tests, group discussions, personality development talks and other kinds of placement-related activities. T&P Cell holds pride in meeting all the requirements of different companies as a part of the placement process. It has provided many jobs to its final year students

== Abeyaantrix ==
Abeyaantrix (Assamese: অভিযান্ত্ৰিক্স, Hindi: अभियांत्रिक्ष) is the national-level annual technical festival of Jorhat Institute of Science & Technology. The name is derived from Sanskrit word "अभियांत्रिकी", which means "engineering". The root word is "अभियंता" in Sanskrit/Hindi or "অভিযন্তা" in Assamese, which means "engineer".

Abeyaantrix is one of the best Techno-Cultural fest in North-East India along with Techxetra, Alecheringa, Incandescence.

This is one of the common platforms in North-East India to showcase knowledge and intellect. It is a blend of different technical and cultural events, and has social events as well. Abeyaantrix attracts enthusiasts from various parts of India. It is one of the technical festivals of North-East India which reaches out to both engineering and non-engineering students. It is sometimes abbreviated as Abx on social networking websites. The latest addition, Abeyaantrix-2018, was held in March 2018.

Abeyaantrix was halted by the college authority in 2019 for an indefinite period due to some unforeseen issues that arose in that edition.

=== Mayaan ===
Mayaan is the souvenir of Abeyaantrix. It is published annually by team Abeyaantrix to commemorate the events held during the fest. It is usually released at the inauguration ceremony of Abeyaantrix in the presence of the guests. Mayaan contains articles poems and other writing by the students and faculty members of JIST. The souvenir also publishes writings by guest writers.

Mayaan is a Hebrew word which means "fountain". It was chosen to convey "a fountain of knowledge".
