= Assam Institute of Management =

Public management university in India

Coordinates: 26.1839°N 91.7858°E

- Type: Public Business school
- Established: 1988; 38 years ago
- Affiliations: Assam Science and Technology University
- Chairman: Minister of Education, Government of Assam
- Director: Dr. Sanjib Raj
- Location: Guwahati, Assam, India
- Website: aimguwahati.edu.in

Assam Institute of Management was established in 1988 by the Government of Assam at Guwahati to promote professional management in North East India. It is run as a Government of Assam Society, the chief Secretary of the State being the chairperson of the Governing Body.

== History ==
At the special request of the then chief minister of Assam, late Sri Hiteswar Saikia, the AICTE accorded approval to the programme. Despite having infrastructural deficiencies, the AICTE had been according approval to the programme mainly because of the rich academic content and faculty resource. With the shifting of the institute to its permanent campus in January 2015, the institute has been able to meet most of the infrastructural requirements.

== Academics ==
The institute has been conducting Post Graduate Diploma in Management (PGDM) Programme since 1994 along with the conduct of the training programmes, research projects and consultancy assignments. Recently from the batch 2018–20, the PGDM Programme has been upgraded to a full-fledged MBA Degree which is affiliated to Assam Science and Technology University (ASTU).

The MBA Programme has been structured on trimester pattern and was reviewed at the national level by CRISIL (a widely reputed international level rating agency). As suggested by the Governing Body of the institute, the PGDM Programme structure was reviewed by two eminent Professors of IIM Calcutta in 2008. The Programme is regularly reviewed every year in the Academic Council Meetings.

It foundation lectures in which distinguished personalities are invited to deliver the lecture. In the past, persons like T. Scarlett Epstein from the University of Sussex, Dr. Subir Choudhuri from IIM, Kolkata, Professor C Rangarajan, former Governor of RBI among others have delivered the foundation lecture of AIM.

== AIM Quest ==
AIM Quest, is the Annual B-School fest, organized by Assam Institute of Management. The fest strives to sensitise on important social issues and corporate social responsibility and creation of socially meaningful actions that leads to benefits beyond their business interests. The various events are:

- Yojana- a business plan contest.
- Quizzicals - a quiz contest.
- Ranbhumi – a business debate contest
- Ad Zap – an advertising contest

== Notification ==
As per the recent AICTE notification, all PGDM programs can be converted to MBA programs. Assam Institute of Management has decided to change the nomenclature of all our PGDM programs to MBA programs from 2018 onwards.
