= Jorhat Engineering College =

Government engineering college in Assam, India

Jorhat Engineering College, Assam
- যোৰহাট অভিযান্ত্ৰিক মহাবিদ্যালয়
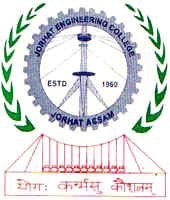
- Other name: JEC
- Motto: योगः कर्मसु कौशलम् (Sanskrit)
- Motto in English: Excellence in Action is Yoga
- Type: Public engineering school
- Established: 10 October 1960; 65 years ago
- Affiliations: Assam Science and Technology University
- Principal: Dr. Rupam Baruah
- Students: 1,500 (approx.)
- Undergraduates: 1,350 (approx.)
- Postgraduates: 150 (approx.)
- Location: Jorhat, Assam, India; 26.746°N 94.249°E
- Campus: Urban, 78 acres (32 ha)
- Approvals: AICTE
- Website: www.jecassam.ac.in

Jorhat Engineering College founded in 1960 by the Government of Assam, is a government engineering college in Assam, northeast India. The college, affiliated with Assam Science and Technology University, is accredited by the All India Council for Technical Education. It has five four-year undergraduate programs: Civil Engineering, Computer Science and Engineering, Electrical Engineering, Instrumentation and Mechanical Engineering. It also offers master's courses in Computer Application (MCA), Civil Engineering (Design of Civil Engineering Structures) Electrical Engineering (Instrumentation and control engineering). It also offers PhD courses.

== History ==
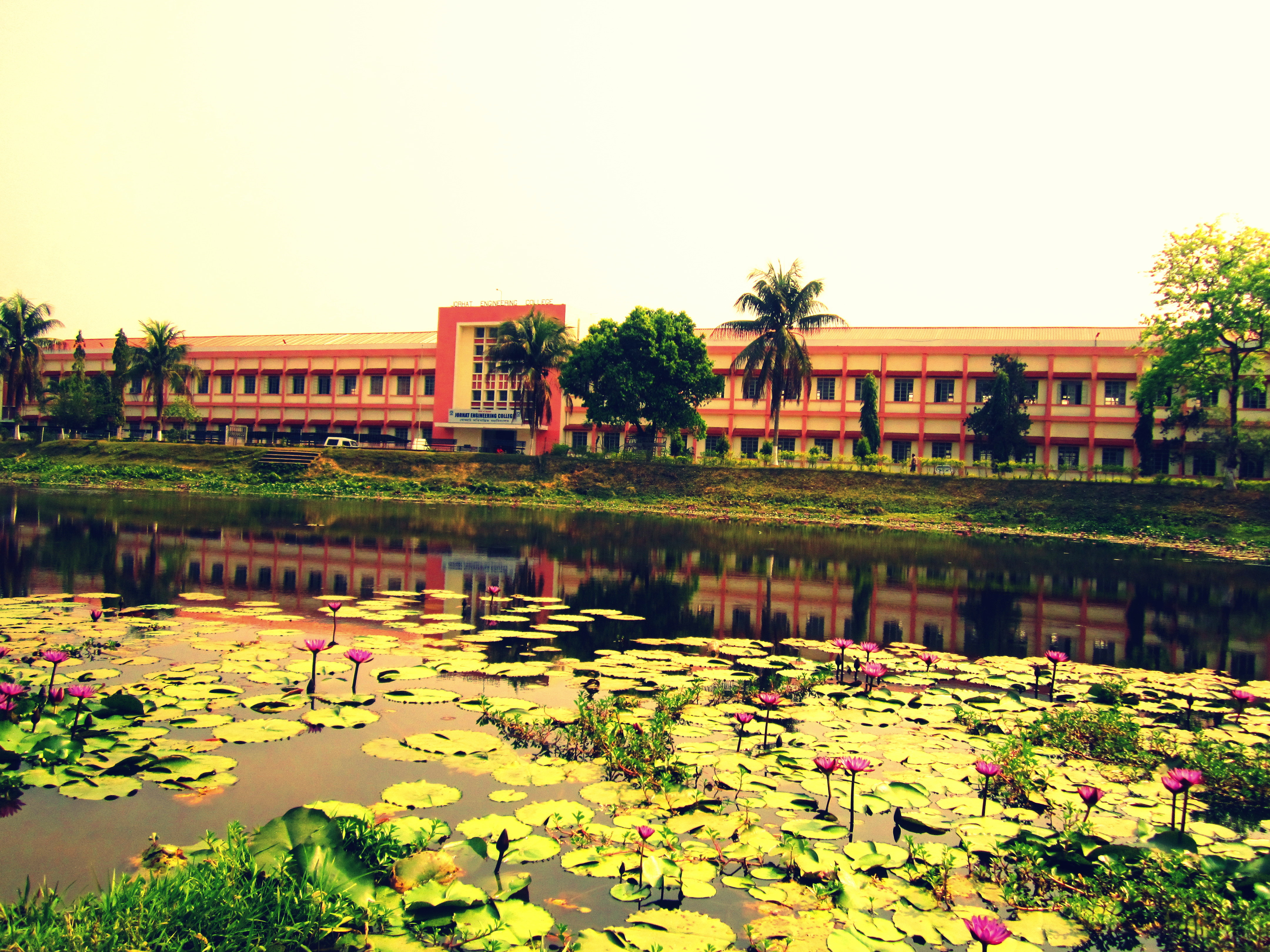
The campus in spring

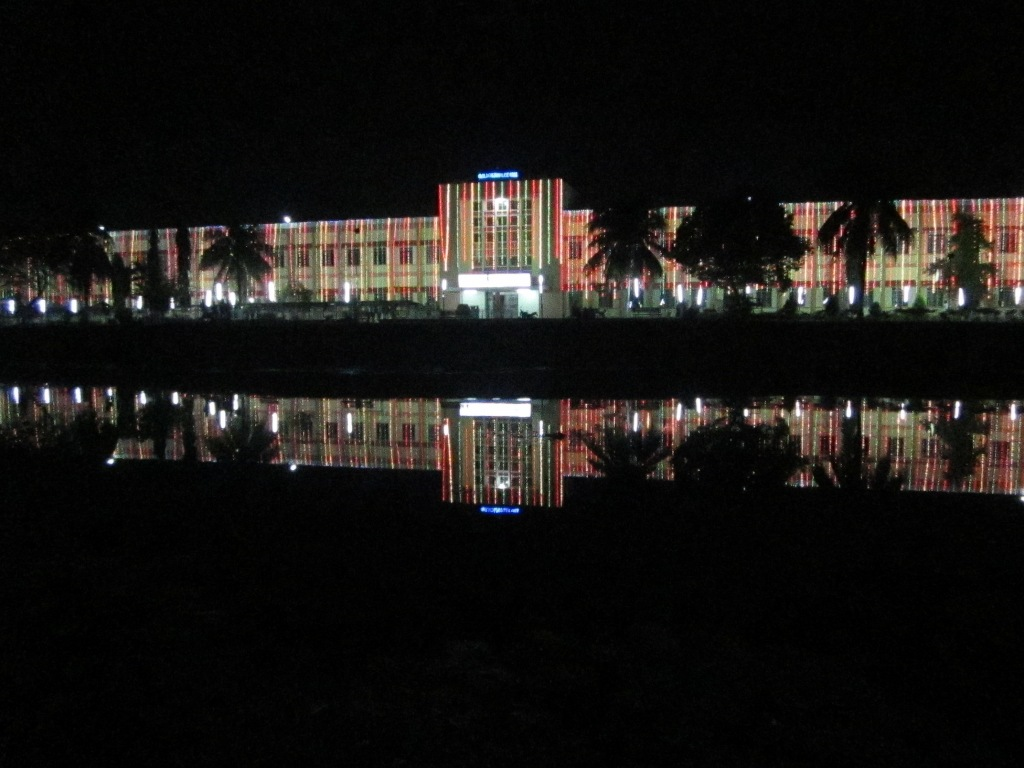
2011 Golden Jubilee

Jorhat Engineering College, the second Government Engineering Institute of Assam came into existence on 7 January 1959 at H.R.H.P.O.W. Institute of Engineering & Technology, Jorhat with the then Principal of the institute, Sri H.N. Barua also as the Principal in-charge of Jorhat Engineering College. The College started functioning with admission of its first batch of students in Civil Engineering, on 10 October 1960.

== Academics ==
The college offers a three-year, postgraduate Master of Computer Applications program for 30 students per year. Its Department of Civil Engineering offers a four-year course leading to a Bachelor of Engineering (B.E) degree for 75 students per year. Established in 1961, the Department of Mechanical Engineering has an intake capacity of 90 students per year. It covers the design, physics and theory of mechanical engineering, including production systems and robotics. Workshops accessible by students have a wide range of machinery and include machine, fitting, automobile and foundry shops.

The Department of Electrical Engineering was established in 1961 with an initial intake capacity of 30 students, later increased to 60. It added instrumentation engineering in 1992, with an intake capacity of 20 students, to meet demand in northeastern India's oil, paper, tea and fertilizer industries. JEC was the first institute in Northeast India to offer B.E. degrees in instrumentation engineering. Both courses are approved by the All India Council for Technical Education in New Delhi. In 2009, the AICTE approved an increase in the instrumentation-engineering intake capacity to 30. Courses had been affiliated with Dibrugarh University in Assam through the 2016–2017 academic year; starting in 2017–2018, JEC's affiliation is with Assam Science and Technology University. Course structure and syllabi are modified at a regular intervals to incorporate new developments in science and technology. The departments incorporate the syllabi of the Graduate Aptitude Test in Engineering and competitive examinations for the Indian Engineering Services and the Indian Administrative Service in its electrical-engineering and instrumentation courses.

The college has offered a B.E. degree in computer science and engineering since 1987. The department offers AICTE-approved courses in computer architecture and organisation, microprocessors, communications engineering, database management systems, artificial intelligence, operating systems, computer networks, interactive computer graphics, image processing, algorithms and distributed computing, and has a computer center.

JEC has a training and placement cell to coordinate the industrial training and placement of pre-final- and final-year students. The cell offers a one-month industrial training program pre-final-year students after their sixth-semester examination. It assists final-year students in job placement by organizing campus interviews by prospective employers.

== Departments ==
Engineering departments

- Civil Engineering
- Computer Science and Engineering
- Mechanical Engineering
- Electrical Engineering
- Instrumentation Engineering

Non-engineering departments

- Chemistry
- Humanities and Social Sciences
- Mathematics
- Physics
- Computer Applications.

== Accommodation ==
The college has eight men's hostels and two women's hostels, each with a faculty superintendent and three or four monitors. Each has a mess for dining, a common room for boarders, recreation rooms, library, reading room, gym and Internet rooms.

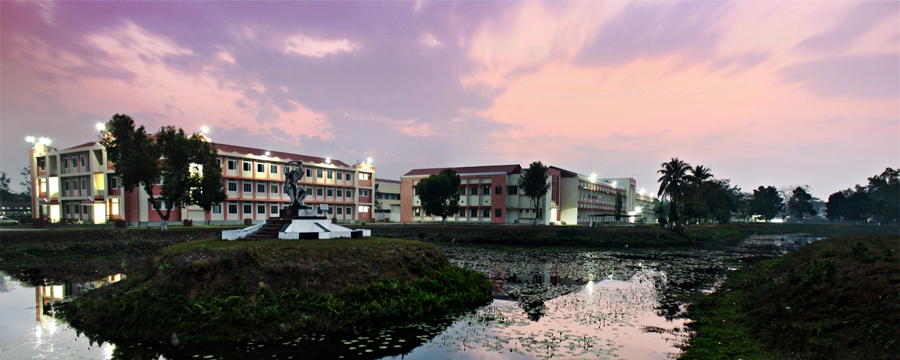
Panorama of the college

== Extracurricular activities and clubs ==
Phoenix is the college's annual techno-cultural festival, with workshops, exhibitions, a quiz, fashion show, gaming, robotics, dance and music. Sifung is its poetry magazine, a joint venture by Achyut Baruah and Shekharan Phukan; Baruah edited the first issue in 2009. Originally a hostel-V initiative, it was later published for the entire college.

FotoKraft is the photography club of the college, promoting student interest in photography and documenting college events. In 1989, JEC was the first educational institution in northeast India to publish a campus newspaper. JEC News was followed by the JEC Chronicle in 2010, published twice per semester. JEC quiz forum is one of the best and active quiz clubs in Eastern part of India. Their annual quiz festival is an attraction with students and professionals from entire eastern part of India participating in it. JEC quiz Forum's quizzes are perhaps considered the only attraction of the institutions fest Phoenix by many professionals, which is class apart from other events. Zatraa- Towards Destiny, a film created by JEC students, explores the life of an engineering student.
