= Guwahati College of Architecture =

Architectural school in Guwahati, India

- Type: Technical education
- Established: 2006; 20 years ago
- Affiliations: Assam Science and Technology University
- Academic affiliations: CEPT University
- Principal: Ar. Sk. Nawaz Ali
- Director: Ar. Biswa Datta
- Students: 500
- Location: Guwahati, Assam, India; 26°05′23″N 91°35′56″E
- Website: guwarchcollege.com

Guwahati College of Architecture (GCA) is an institute of higher education located in Guwahati, Assam, India. It was established in 2006 to provide the skills for a career in architecture.

The college collaborates with CEPT University, running a student and teacher exchange program. GCA participates in the Pidilite Award for excellence

== Courses ==
Two courses in architecture are available from the college:

- Bachelor of Architecture (B.Arch) – 5 years
- Master of Architecture (M.Arch) – 2 years

== Campus ==
Guwahati College of Architecture is located on Zoo Road, in west Guwahati. The 1 million square foot campus includes a library, 550-seat lecture theatre, two workshops, sports facilities and a computer lab. Wi-Fi internet connection is available across the campus. Classrooms make use of modern technology such as digital drawing studios.
