= Scholar's Institute of Technology & Management =

Scholar's Institution of Technology & Management
- Other name: SITM
- Motto: Education For Emancipation And Empowerment
- Type: Trustee
- Established: 2010
- Location: Guwahati, Assam, India

Scholar's Institute of Technology & Management is a technology and management institute located in Garchuk, Guwahati, Assam, India, and is promoted by the Scholar's Academy Education Trust, founded on 8 May 2008 under the Indian Trusts Act, 1882.

== Campus ==
The institute is in Garchuk in the Guwahati city. The campus is surrounded by hills and is spread over a lush green expanse of more than 10 acres.

The institute is easily accessible from the Guwahati city. The institute is 22 km from Guwahati railway station; 18 km from Lokpriya Gopinath Bordoloi International Airport; 14 km from Kamakhya Junction railway station; and 5.7 km from Rupnath Brahma Inter-State Bus Terminus, Guwahati.

== Departments ==
- Mechanical Engineering
- Electrical & Electronic Engineering
- Electronics and Communication Engineering
- Computer Science Engineering
- Civil Engineering
- Mechanical Engineering

== See also ==
- List of educational institutions in Guwahati
