= Assam Engineering College =

Oldest Engineering College of North East India

Assam Engineering College Guwahati
- অসম অভিযান্ত্ৰিক মহাবিদ্যালয়
- Motto: "Service before self "
- Type: Public engineering school
- Established: 1955; 71 years ago
- Accreditation: UGC, AICTE, NBA
- Affiliations: Assam Science and Technology University
- Principal: Dr. Amrita Ganguly
- Undergraduates: 1650
- Postgraduates: 100
- Location: Guwahati, Assam, India; 26°08′34″N 91°39′35″E
- Campus: Urban, (400 acres)
- Acronym: AEC
- Approvals: AICTE
- Website: aec.ac.in

Assam Engineering College, established in 1955, is located in Guwahati. It is the first engineering college of Assam and is affiliated to Assam Science and Technology University. AEC has been the hub of many academic and supplementary activities in Assam. It is a public college run by the state of Assam. While the majority of students are from Assam, there are fixed quotas for students from neighbouring states. The college is approved by the All India Council for Technical Education AICTE.

The college offers bachelor's courses (B.Tech.) in the fields of Electrical Engineering, Chemical Engineering, Civil Engineering, Computer Science and Engineering, Electronics and Telecommunication Engineering, Industrial and Production Engineering, Instrumentation Engineering and Mechanical Engineering. It also offers M.Tech in Civil Engineering (CE), Electrical Engineering (EE) and Mechanical Engineering (ME). It offers MCA course under the Department of Computer Applications and also avails D.Tech facility in Soil Mechanics and Hydraulics under the Civil Engineering Department. Previously it was affiliated to Gauhati University. From academic year 2017-18 all the courses are affiliated to Assam Science and Technology University (ASTU).

== History ==
Assam Engineering College was established in 1955, the first undergraduate engineering college in North-Eastern India. It started with Civil Engineering, and within a few years other departments came into existence. Currently, it awards bachelor's degrees in eight engineering disciplines and master's degree in Mechanical Engineering, Electrical Engineering, Computer Applications and Civil Engineering. There are availability of PhD programs in all the departments.

== Location ==
Assam Engineering College is in Jalukbari in south-west Guwahati.

== Academics ==
Assam Engineering College houses the following departments:

- Civil Engineering
- Chemical Engineering
- Computer Science & Engineering
- Electrical & Instrumentation Engineering
- Electronics & Telecommunication Engineering
- Mechanical Engineering
- Industrial & Production Engineering
- Computer Applications
- Humanities and Social Sciences
- Chemistry
- Mathematics
- Physics

=== Department of Civil Engineering ===
The department of Civil Engineering, established in 1956, was the first branch introduced in this college.

The annual intake capacity is 90 students per semester in the B.Tech. degree course and 25 students in the M.E. degree course. This department also offers a Ph.D. degree in Soil Mechanics and Hydraulics. However, it has a variable intake. The student to teacher ratio for each semester is 3:1. The head of the department is Dr.Jayanta Pathak.

=== Department of Chemical Engineering ===
The Chemical Engineering Department was started in 1963 and had an annual intake capacity of 60 students in the B.Tech. degree. The laboratories of this department are for research work in chemical engineering leading to a Ph.D. degree.

The department has been providing a four-year undergraduate course for Chemical Engineering. The core subjects include Process Calculation, Chemical Technology, Chemical Engineering Thermodynamics, Mass Transfer Operations, Heat Transfer Operations, Chemical Reaction Engineering, Process Dynamics & Control, Petroleum Refinery Engineering & Petrochemicals, Process Equipment Design & Drawing, Fluid Flow Operation, Transport Phenomenon, Process Utilities, Process Instrumentation, Material Science, and Polymer Science.

=== Department of Computer Science and Engineering ===
The Department of Computer Science and Engineering was established on 25 August 1998; it is the newest department. Presently, it is attached to the Electronics & Telecommunications Department. The annual intake capacity is 20 students per semester in the B.Tech. degree course.

The course available is Bachelor of Engineering. The duration of the B.E. is four years having eight semesters. The head of the department is Prof. D.S. Pegu.

=== Department of Electrical Engineering ===
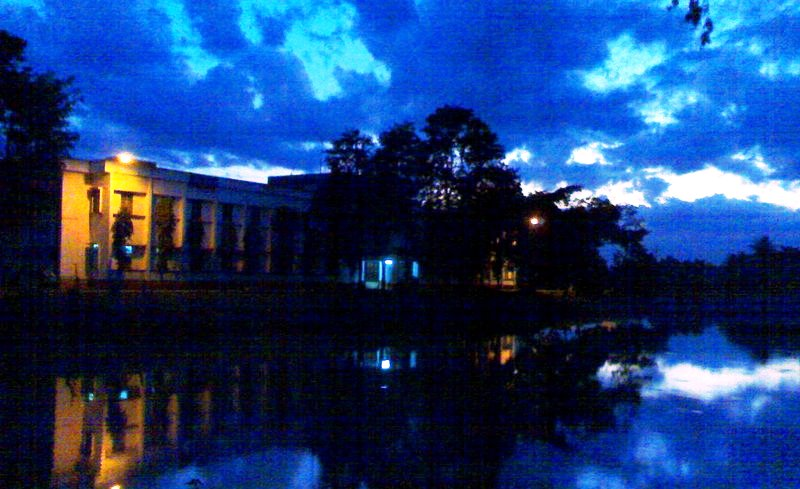
AEC Chemical/Administrative Building in the evening

The Electrical Engineering branch established its roots in Assam Engineering College in 1957, as the second functioning branch.

The branch offers Bachelor of Technology (B.Tech.) degree and has an annual intake of 90 students. The department has a student-to-teacher ratio of 5:1.

The curriculum of the department is mainly oriented to cater for the needs of all types of industries, such as power, IT, and heavy and light electrical machinery. The department also offers a postgraduate program on power system. It has a total intake capacity of 18. The admission in this programme is through the PGCEE (Post-Graduate Common Entrance Examination) and a valid GATE score. The course consists of load flow dynamics, advance topics in power systems, facts devices, artificial intelligence, reliability in Power system, advanced protection, and operation technology. The department also has research facilities. The head of the department Dr. Runumi Sarma. Various lab facilities are available with an extra emphasis on digital, microprocessor and machine laboratories.

=== Department of Instrumentation Engineering ===
The branch of Instrumentation Engineering was introduced in 1998 due to the high demand for instrumentation engineers in industries and companies. The branch was recognised by AICTE in 2001.

In AEC, there is an intake of 20 instrumentation engineering students every year. The head of the department is Dr. Runumi Sarma.

=== Department of Electronics and Telecommunications Engineering ===
Established in 1984, it is the first in this field for providing a Bachelor of Engineering (B.E.) degree in Electronics & Telecommunication Engineering under the state government. It has an annual intake of 60 students. The department offers syllabus covering the major thrust areas in the field of electronics and telecommunication. The head of the department is Prof. D.S. Pegu.

=== Department of Mechanical Engineering ===
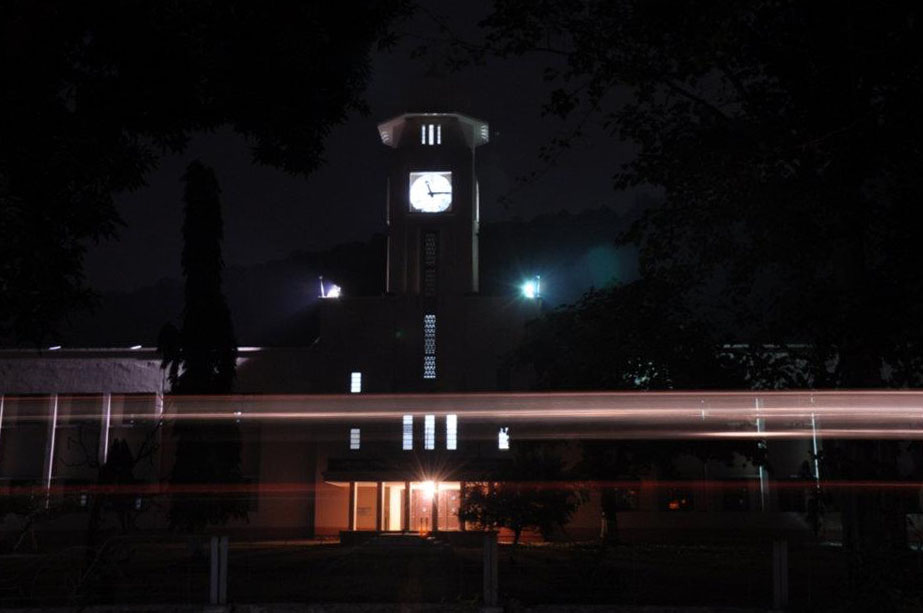
AEC night view

The department of Mechanical Engineering, established in 1957, was one of the first departments of the college. It offers B.E. courses of four years with an annual intake of 60 students and a student-to-teacher ratio of 5:2. The head of the department is Dr. R.K. Dutta.

=== Department of Industrial and Production Engineering ===
The branch of Industrial and Production Engineering was introduced in 1998 due to a high demand for production engineers in oil sectors and companies. The branch was recognised by AICTE in 2001. The head of the department is Dr. R.K. Dutta.

=== Department of Computer Applications ===
The department of Computer Applications, established in 1990, offers M.C.A. courses of three years duration with an annual intake of 30 students and a student to teacher ratio of 3:1.

The department has three laboratories. The department is headed by Dr. Subhrajyoti Bordoloi.

== Societies ==
Societies/club on AEC campus include:

- AEC Quiz Club
- AEC Media Cell
- AEC Jam Club
- AEC Beat House Club
- AEC Coding Club
- AEC literary Club
- Flashpoint, the Photography Club
- AEC Bihu Husori Club
- AEC Riders Club
- Bi-cycle Club
- Energy Club
- Entrepreneurship Development Cell, AEC (EDC, AEC)
- ISTE Student Chapter
- Robotics Club
- SOVIC - Social Responsibility Cell
- AEC Automobile Club (under SAE)
- Space Technology Club, AEC

== Facilities ==
=== Hostels ===
In all there are ten hostels, nine of which are for undergraduate students, including one for female students and one for male postgraduates. Each hostel is self-contained with amenities such as a common room, a library, an indoor games room, a lounge and a dining hall with mess. In earlier times no rooms were provided with Internet access and boarders managed on their own through their respective 'Internet monitors', but since 2010 the central internet facility to the college has been extended to the hostels. The administrative head of each hostel, the superintendent, is a senior faculty member. There are Hostel Committees, composed of superintendent and a student body of block monitors, mess secretaries, sports secretary, cultural secretary, magazine secretary, welfare secretary, Internet monitors and auditors. The committee is a successful exercise in self-governance.

=== Central Computing Center ===
Central Computing Center (CCC) is a central facility established in Assam Engineering College which caters to the needs of academic departments and various sections of the institute. CCC is instituted in a separate building.

=== Bank and shopping complex ===
The institute has a State Bank of India (SBI) branch inside the campus. It provides assistance in opening savings account and depositing institute-related fees and dues. There is an ATM of SBI installed within the campus for easy cash access for the students.

The institute has a market complex in the center of the campus which caters to all kinds of student necessities.

=== Postal service ===
The institute has a government post office on the campus maintained by Indian Post. The postal index number(PIN) of AEC Post Office is 781013.

=== College canteen ===
The canteen is situated near the Main Building.

=== Health ===
The AEC Hospital provides indoor and outdoor medical facilities for common ailments. Complicated cases are referred for treatment to civic hospitals in the city.

=== Bus service ===
Bus services have been provided for the students to connect city life from college. Many ASTC College buses are plying from the college to Church Field, Paltan Bazar, Beltola, Chandmari, Ganeshguri and vice versa. There is also a real time bus tracking facility for AEC bus service.

== Annual festivals ==
=== Annual Cultural fest: Pyrokinesis ===
Pyrokinesis is the annual national level cultural festival of Assam Engineering College.

=== Annual Technical fest: Udbhavanam ===
AEC has organized its first ever technical festival, Udbhavanam in the year 2012, after it got separated from Pyrokinesis, and decided to dedicate 2 days to technical competitions, workshops, lectures and seminars.

The events are organized and managed by students of the college with guidance of professors. There are events covering every technical department of the college namely, Civil, Mechanical, Electrical, Electronics and Telecommunication, Chemical, Computer Science, Instrumentation and Industrial Production Engineering. There are also events managed by the Entrepreneurship Development Cell of AEC.

== Admissions ==
- Students are taken in for undergraduate (B.Tech.) courses through Combined Entrance Examination (CEE) conducted by ASTU.
- Lateral entry into the undergraduate (B.Tech.) courses is done through the Joint Lateral Entrance Examination (JLEE) conducted by ASTU.
- Admission to the postgraduate (M.Tech.) and doctorate (Ph.D.) courses are primarily based on scores in the GATE exam, conducted by the IITs or through the entrance examination (AECPGEE) conducted by the institute.
- Admission to the MCA course is taken through the Joint MCA Entrance Examination (JMEE) conducted by ASTU.

== Campus Issue ==
Despite being a premier technical college, AEC does not have a closed campus and there has been a rising demand from the student and faculty community for a closed campus. But due to negligence of state government and college higher authority this demand has not been fulfilled. Students face severe threat from the local community and regular incidents of trouble between the local community and students is common.
