= List of colleges affiliated to the Gauhati University =

{This is not a complete list of all institutes; only a few are mentioned.}

== B.ED colleges ==
- Nazir Ajmal Memorial College of Education, Hojai, Assam
- Anunduram Baruah Academy B.Ed. College, Pathsala (Barpeta)
- Asom Sikshak Prashiksan Mahavidyalaya, Lankeswar
- Ataur Rahman College of Education, Udmari Kalgachi (Barpeta)
- Baihata Chariali B.Ed. College, Baihata Chariali (Kamrup)
- Bajali Teacher's Training College, Pattacharkuchi, Barpeta.
- Barnagar B.Ed. College, Sorbhog (Barpeta)
- Barpeta B.T. College (Barpeta)
- Biswanath College of Education, Chariali (Sonitpur)
- Bongaigaon B.Ed. College, Bongaigaon
- College of Education Boko Kamrup
- College of Education, Guwahati (Kamrup)
- College of Education, Morigaon
- College of Education, Nagaon
- Dr. Anita Baruah Sarmah College of Education, Guwahati (Kamrup)
- Dakshin Guwahati B.Ed. College, Guwahati
- Damdama B.Ed. College, Kulhati (Kamrup)
- Deomornoi B.Ed. College, Deomornoi (Darrang)
- Dhubri P.G.T.T. College, Jhagrarpar (Dhubri)
- Dudhnoi Teachers Training College, Dudhnoi (Goalpara)
- East Gauhati B.Ed. College, Guwahati
- Faculty College of Education, North Gauhati (Kamrup)
- Gossaigaon B.Ed. College, Gossaigaon (Kokrajhar)
- Govt. B.T. College, Goalpara
- Govt. Banikanta College of Teacher Education, Guwahati (Kamrup)
- Govt. College of Teacher's Education, Kokrajhar (Kokrajhar)
- Govt. College of Teacher's Education, Tezpur (Sonitpur)
- Imperial College of Education, Dispur (Kamrup)
- K.R.D. College of Education, Chhaygaon (Kamrup)
- Kaliabor College of Education, Kuwaritol (Nagaon)
- Krishna Bora B.Ed. College, Lanka ASSAM
- Mangaldai Govt. Teachers' Training College, Mangaldai (Darrang)
- Nalbari B.Ed. College, Nalbari
- National Institute for Teacher Education, Khetri (Kamrup)
- P.G. College of Education, Tezpur (Sonitpur)
- Pachim Nalbari B.Ed. College, Nalbari (Nalbari)
- Pragjyotish B.Ed. College, Pacharia
- R.C Saharia T.T College, Tangla Udalguri
- Rangia Teacher Training College, Rangia (Kamrup)
- SDP College of Teacher Education, Tihu
- Sikshan Mahavidyalaya, Nagaon
- Sipajhar B.Ed. College, Sipajhar (Darrang
- Teacher's training college, Mirza.
- West Guwahati College of Education, kotihati
- HAM-AK Rural College of Education, Shillongani, Nagaon

== Law colleges ==
- Ajmal Law College, Hojai
- Barpeta Law College Barpeta
- Bongaigaon Law College, Bongaigaon
- BRM Government Law College, Kamrup
- Dhubri Law College
- Dispur Law College
- Goalpara Law College, Goalpara
- J.B. Law College, Kamrup
- Kokrajhar Law College
- Mangaldai Law College, Darrang
- Morigaon Law College, Morigaon
- Nalbari Law College
- NEF Law College
- Nowgong Law College
- Tezpur Law College
- University Law College, GU

== List of other colleges in alphabetical order ==
=== A ===
- A.C.A. jr College, Missamari (Biswanath)
- A.D.P. College, Nagaon (Nagaon)
- Abhayapuri College, Abhayapuri (Bongaigaon)
- Agia College, Agia (Goalpara)
- Alamganj Rangamati College, Alamganj (Dhubri)
- Alhaz Sunai Bibi Choudhury College, Lanka (Nagaon)
- Amrit Chandra Thakuria Commerce College (Kamrup)
- Anandaram Dhekial Phookan College, Nagaon.
- Arya Vidyapeeth College (Autonomous) Guwahati.

=== B ===
- B.H.B. College, Sarupeta (Barpeta)
- Bagadhar Brahma Kishan College, Jalahghat (Baksa)
- Bimala Prasad Chaliha College, Nagarbera (Kamrup)
- B. Borooah College, Guwahati (Kamrup)
- Baihata Chariali B.Ed. College, Baihata Chariali (Kamrup)
- Bajali College, Pathsala (Barpeta) (Now Bhattadev University, not an affiliated college)
- Bamundi Mahavidyalaya, Bamundi (Kamrup)
- Baosi Banikanta Kakoti College, Nagaon (Barpeta)
- Bapujee College, Sarthebari (Barpeta)
- Barama College, Barama (Baksa)
- Barbhag College, Kalag (Nalbari)
- Barkhetri College, Mukalmua (Nalbari)
- Barnagar B.Ed. College, Sorbhog (Barpeta)
- Barpeta Bongaigaon College, Langla (Barpeta)
- Barpeta College, Barpeta
- Barpeta Girls' College, Barpeta
- Barpeta Road Howli College, Howli (Barpeta)
- Baska College, Baganpara (Baksa)
- Basugaon College, Basugaon (Chirang)
- Batadraba Sri Sri Sankardev College, Batadraba (Nagaon)
- Behali Degree College, Borgang (Sonitpur)
- Beinstein College, Lokhora
- Beltola College, Guwahati
- Bengtol College, Bengtol (Chirang)
- Bezara Anchalik College, Bezara (Kamrup)
- Bhawanipur Anchalik College, Bhawanipur (Barpeta)
- Bholanath College, Dhubri
- Bhuragaon College, Bhuragaon (Morigaon)
- Bijni College, Bijni (Chirang)
- Bikali College, Dhupdhara (Goalpara)
- Bilasipara College, Bilasipara (Dhubri)
- Binandi Chandra Medhi College, Ramdia (Kamrup)
- Birjhora Kanya Mahavidyalaya, Bongaigaon (Bongaigaon)
- Birjhora Mahavidyalaya, Bongaigaon (Bongaigaon)
- Biswanath College of Education, Chariali (Sonitpur)
- Biswanath Commerce College, Biswanath (Sonitpur)
- BMBB Commerce College, Guwahati
- Bodofa U.N. Brahma College, Dotma (Kokrajhar)
- Bongaigaon B.Ed. College, Bongaigaon
- Bongaigaon College, Bongaigaon
- Bajali Teacher's Training College, Pattacharkuchi, Barpeta.

=== C ===
- Chaiduar College, Gohpur (Sonitpur)
- Chhamaria Anchalik College, Chhamaria (Kamrup)
- Chandrapur College, Chandrapur (Kamrup)
- Charaibahi College, Charaibahi (Morigaon)
- Chariduar College, Gohpur (Sonitpur)
- Chatia College, Sootia (Sonitpur)
- Chhaygaon College, Chhaygaon (Kamrup)
- Chilarai College, Golakganj (Dhubri)
- Chunari College (chunari)
- College of Education, Boko (Kamrup)
- College of Education, Guwahati (Kamrup)
- College of Education, Morigaon
- College of Education, Nagaon
- Commerce College, Kokrajhar (Kokrajhar)

=== D ===
- Dr. Anita Baruah Sarmah College of Education, Guwahati (Kamrup)
- Dr. B. Borooah Cancer Institute
- Dr. B. K. B. College, Puranigudam (Nagaon)
- Dr. Birinchi Kumar Barooah College, Puranigudam (Nagaon)
- Dakshin Guwahati B.Ed. College, Guwahati
- Dakshin Kamrup College, Mirza (Kamrup)
- Dakshin Kamrup Girls' College, Mirza (Kamrup)
- Dakshin Nalbari Mahavidyalaya, Niz-Bahjani (Nalbari)
- Dakshinpat College, Bhomoraguri (Nagaon)
- Dalgoma Anchalik College, Matia (Goalpara)
- Damdama B.Ed. College, Kulhati (Kamrup)
- Damdama College, Kulhati (Kamrup)
- Darrang College, Tezpur (Sonitpur)
- Deomornoi B.Ed. College, Deomornoi (Darrang)
- Deomornoi Degree College, Deomornoi (Darrang)
- Dhamdhama Anchalik College, Dhamdhama (Nalbari)
- Dharamtul College, Ahatguri (Morigaon))
- Dharmasala College, Dharmasala (Dhubri)
- Dhing College, Dhing (Nagaon)
- Dhubri P.G.T.T. College, Jhagrarpar (Dhubri)
- Dhubri Girls' College, Dhubri
- Dimoria College, Khetri (Kamrup)
- Dispur College, Guwahati (Kamrup)
- Dispur Law College, Dispur
- Dronacharjya College, Barpeta Road (Barpeta)
- Dudhnoi College, Dudhnoi (Goalpara)
- Dudhnoi Teachers Training College, Dudhnoi (Goalpara)
- Duni Degree College (Darrang)

=== E ===
- East Gauhati B.Ed. College, Guwahati (Kamrup)

=== F ===
- F.A. Ahmed College, Goraimari, Tukrapara (Kamrup)
- Faculty College of Education, North Gauhati (Kamrup)
- Fakiragram College, Fakiragram (Kokrajhar)

=== G ===
- G.L. Choudhury College, Barpeta Road (Barpeta)
- Gauhati Commerce College, Guwahati (Kamrup)
- Ghanakanta Baruah College, Morigaon (Morigaon)
- Girls' College Kokrajhar, Kokrajhar (Kokrajhar)
- Goalpara College, Goalpara (Goalpara)
- Golden College (RATHNAPITH)
- Goreswar College, Goreswar (Baksa)
- Gossaigaon College, Gossaigaon (Kokrajhar)
- Govt. B.T. College, Goalpara
- Govt. K.K. Handique Sanskrit College, Guwahati (Kamrup)
- Govt. Banikanta College of Teacher Education, Guwahati (Kamrup)
- Govt. College of Teacher's Education (CTE), Tezpur (Sonitpur)
- Govt. Shikshan Mahavidyalaya, Nagaon (Nagaon)
- Guwahati College, Guwahati (Kamrup)
- Gyanpeeth Degree College, Nikashi (Baksa)

=== H ===
- Habraghat Mahavidyalaya, Krishnai (Goalpara)
- Haji Ajmal Ali College (Nagaon)
- Haji Anfor Ali College, Doboka (Nagaon)
- Halakura College, Mahamayahat (Dhubri)
- Hamidabad College, Jamadarhat (Dhubri)
- Handique Girls College, Guwahati
- Harendra Chitra College, Bhaktardoba, (Barpeta)
- Hari Gayatri Das College, Guwahati (Kamrup)
- Hatichong College, Hatichong (Nagaon)
- Hatidhura College, Hatidhura (Dhubri)
- Hatsingimari College, Hatsingimari, Dhubri
- Hindustan College, Guwahati
- Hojai College, Hojai (Nagaon)
- Hojai Girls' College, Hojai (Nagaon)

=== I ===
- Icon Commerce College, Guwahati (Kamrup)
- Imperia College of Education, Dispur (Kamrup)
- Indira Gandhi College, Boitamari (Bongaigaon)
- InfoEd College of Computer Education
- Institute of Strategic Business Management (ISBM), Guwahati (Kamrup)

=== J ===
- Jettwings Business School, Guwahati (Kamrup Urban)
- Jettwings Institute Of Fashion, Design & Architecture, Guwahati (Kamrup Urban)
- Jagiroad College, Jagiroad (Morigaon)
- Jaleswar College, Tapoban (Goalpara)
- Jamduar College, Saraibil (Kokrajhar)
- Jamunamukh College, Jamunamukh (Nagaon)
- Janapriya College, Garemari (Barpeta)
- Janata College, (Serfanguri), Kokrajhar
- Jawaharlal Nehru College, Boko (Kamrup)
- Juria College, Fakuli Pathar (Nagaon)

=== K ===
- K.C. Das Commerce College, Guwahati (Kamrup)
- K.R.B. Girls' College, Guwahati
- K.R.D. College of Education, Chhaygaon (Kamrup)
- Kalabari College, Kalabari (Sonitpur)
- Kalaguru Bishnu Rabha Degree College, Orang (Udalguri)
- Kaliabor College of Education, Kuwaritol (Nagaon)
- Kamrup College, Chamata (Nalbari)
- Kampur College, Kampur (Nagaon)
- Kanpai Bordoloi College, Borchila (Morigaon)
- Kanya Mahavidyalaya, Guwahati
- Karmashree Hiteswar Saikia College, Guwahati
- Katahguri College, Tuktuki (Nagaon)
- Kayakuchi College, Kayakuchi (Barpeta)
- Khagarijan College, Chotahaibar (Nagaon)
- Kharupetia College, Kharupetia (Darrang)
- Khetri Dharmapur College, Bari (Nalbari)
- Khoirabari College, Khoirabari (Udalguri)
- Kokrajhar Government College, Kokrajhar (Kokrajhar)
- Kokrajhar Music and Fine Arts College, Kokrajhar
- Krishna Bora B.Ed. College, Lanka
- Krishanaguru Mahavidyalaya, Nasatra (Barpeta)

=== L ===
- L.C. Bharali College, Guwahati
- L.G.B. Girls' College, Tezpur (Sonitpur)
- Lokopriya Gopinath Bordoloi Regional Institute of Mental Health
- Lachit Barphookan Commerce Academy, Morikalong (Nagaon)
- Lakhipur College, Lakhipur (Goalpara)
- Lalit Chandra Bharali College, Guwahati
- Lanka Mahavidyalaya, Lanka (Nagaon)
- Lokanayak Omeo Kumar Das College, Dhekiajuli (Sonitpur)
- Luitparia College, Kalairdia (Barpeta)
- Lumding College, Lumding (Nagaon)

=== M ===
- M.C. College, Barpeta (Barpeta)
- M.N.C. Balika Mahavidyalaya, Nalbari
- Madhab Choudhury College, Barpeta
- Madhya Kamrup College, Subha, Chenga (Barpeta)
- Madhya Kampeeth College, Borka, Pub-Borka (Kamrup)
- Manabendra Sarma Girls' College, Rangia (Kamrup)
- Mankachar College, Mankachar (Dhubri)
- Mandia Anchalik College, Mandia (Barpeta)
- Mangaldai Govt. Teachers' Training College, Mangaldai (Darrang)
- Mangaldai College, Mangaldai (Darrang)
- Mangaldai Commerce College, Mangaldai (Darrang)
- Mangaldai Degree Girls College, Magnaldai (Darrang)
- Mahatma Gandhi College, Chalantapara (Bongaigaon)
- Majbat College, Majbat (Udalguri)
- Manikpur Anchalik College, Manikpur (Bongaigaon)
- Mayang Anchalik College, Raja-Mayang (Morigaon)
- Mazbat College, Mazbat (Darrang)
- Milanjyoti College, Itervita (Barpeta)
- Missamari College, Missamari (Sonitpur)
- Moirabari College, Moirabari (Morigaon)
- Morigaon College, Morigaon (Morigaon)
- Murazar College, Murazar (Nagaon)
- Mushalpur College, Mushalpur, (Baksa)

=== N ===
- Nagaon G. N. D. G. Commerce College, Panigaon (Nagaon)
- Nabajyoti College, Kalgachia (Barpeta)
- Nalbari B.Ed. College, Nalbari
- Nalbari College, Nalbari
- Nalbari Commerce College, Nalbari
- Nalbari Sanskrit College, Nalbari (Nalbari)
- Narangi Anchalik Mahavidyalaya, Guwahati (Kamrup)
- National Institute for Teacher Education, Khetri (Kamrup)
- Navasakti College, Majgoan (Barpeta)
- Nirmal Haloi College, Patacharkuchi (Barpeta)
- Nonoi College, Nonoi (Nagaon)
- North Gauhati College, Guwahati
- North Kamrup College, Baghmara (Barpeta)
- Nowgong College, Nagaon
- Nowgong Girls' College, Nagaon

=== P ===
• Pandit Deendayal Upadhaya Adarsha Mahavidyalaya, Amjonga Goalpara

- P.G. College of Education, Tezpur (Sonitpur)
- Pandu College, maligaon
- Paschim Guwahati Mahavidyalaya, Guwahati
- Paschim Barigog Anchalik Mahavidyalaya, Baranghati (Kamrup)
- Pachim Nalbari B.Ed. College, Nalbari (Nalbari)
- Patidarrang College, Loch (Kamrup)
- Pragjyotish B.Ed. College, Pacharia
- Pragjyotish College (Autonomous), Guwahati
- Pramathesh Barua College, Gauripur (Dhubri)
- Province College, Ganeshguri
- Progati College, Agomani (Dhubri)
- Pub-Bongsor College, Pacharia
- Pub Kamrup College, Baihata Chariali (Kamrup)
- Puthimari College, Soneswar (Kamrup)
- Pune Institute Of Business Management, Guwahati campus (Kamrup)

=== R ===
- Radha Govinda Baruah College, Guwahati
- Raha College, Ranha (Nagaon)
- Rajiv Gandhi Memorial College, Lengtisinga (Bongaigaon)
- Rampur Anchalik College, Rampur (Kamrup)
- Rangapara College, Rangapara (Sonitpur)
- Rangia College, Rangia (Kamrup)
- Rangia Teacher Training College, Rangia (Kamrup)
- Ratnapith College, Chapar (Dhubri)
- Rupahi College, Rupahi (Nagaon)

=== S ===
- Salbari College, Salbari (Baksa)
- Samaguri College, Samaguri (Nagaon)
- Sapatgram College, Sapatgram (Dhubri)
- Saraighat College, Changsari (Kamrup)
- S. B. Deorah College, Bora Service (Guwahati)
- Science College, Kokrajhar (Kokrajhar)
- Sikshan Mahavidyalaya, Nagaon
- Sipajhar B.Ed. College, Sipajhar (Darrang)
- Sipajhar College, Sipajhar (Darrang)
- Sonapur College, Sonapur (Kamrup)
- Sontali Anchalik College, Mahatoli (Kamrup)
- South Salmara College, South Salmara (Dhubri)
- Srimanta Sankar Madhab Mahavidyalay, Bhatkuchi (Barpeta)
- State College of Music, Guwahati
- Sualkuchi Budram Madhab Satradhikar College, Sualkuchi (Kamrup)
- Sukuram Bharali Commerce & Management College, Khetri (Kamrup)
- Suren Das College, Hajo (Kamrup)
- Swami Yogananda Giri College, Saktiashram (Kokrajhar)
- Swadeshi College of Commerce, Guwahati
- SDP College of Teacher Education, Tihu

=== T ===
- T.H.B. College, Jamugurihat (Sonitpur)
- Tamulpur College, Tamulpur (Baksa)
- Tangla College, Tangla (Udalguri)
- Tezpur College, Tezpur (Sonitpur)
- Thamna Anchalik Degree College, Thamna (Baksa)
- Tihu College, Tihu (Nalbari)
- Tupamari anchalik college, Tupamari (Kamrup)

=== U ===
- U.N. Brahma College, Kajalgaon, (Chirang)
- Udalguri College, Udalguri (Udalguri)
- Udali College, Bamungaon (Nagaon)
- Uttar Barpeta College, Sankuchi (Barpeta)
- Uttar Kampith Mahavidyalaya, Jagara (Nalbari)

=== V ===
- Vidya Bharati College, Kendua (Kamrup)

=== W ===
- West Gauhati Commerce College, Guwahati (Maligaon)
- West Goalpara College, Ambari, PO Balarbhita, Dist. Goalpara, 783129
