= Birendra Nath Datta =

Indian academic and musician (1935–2023)

Birendranath Datta
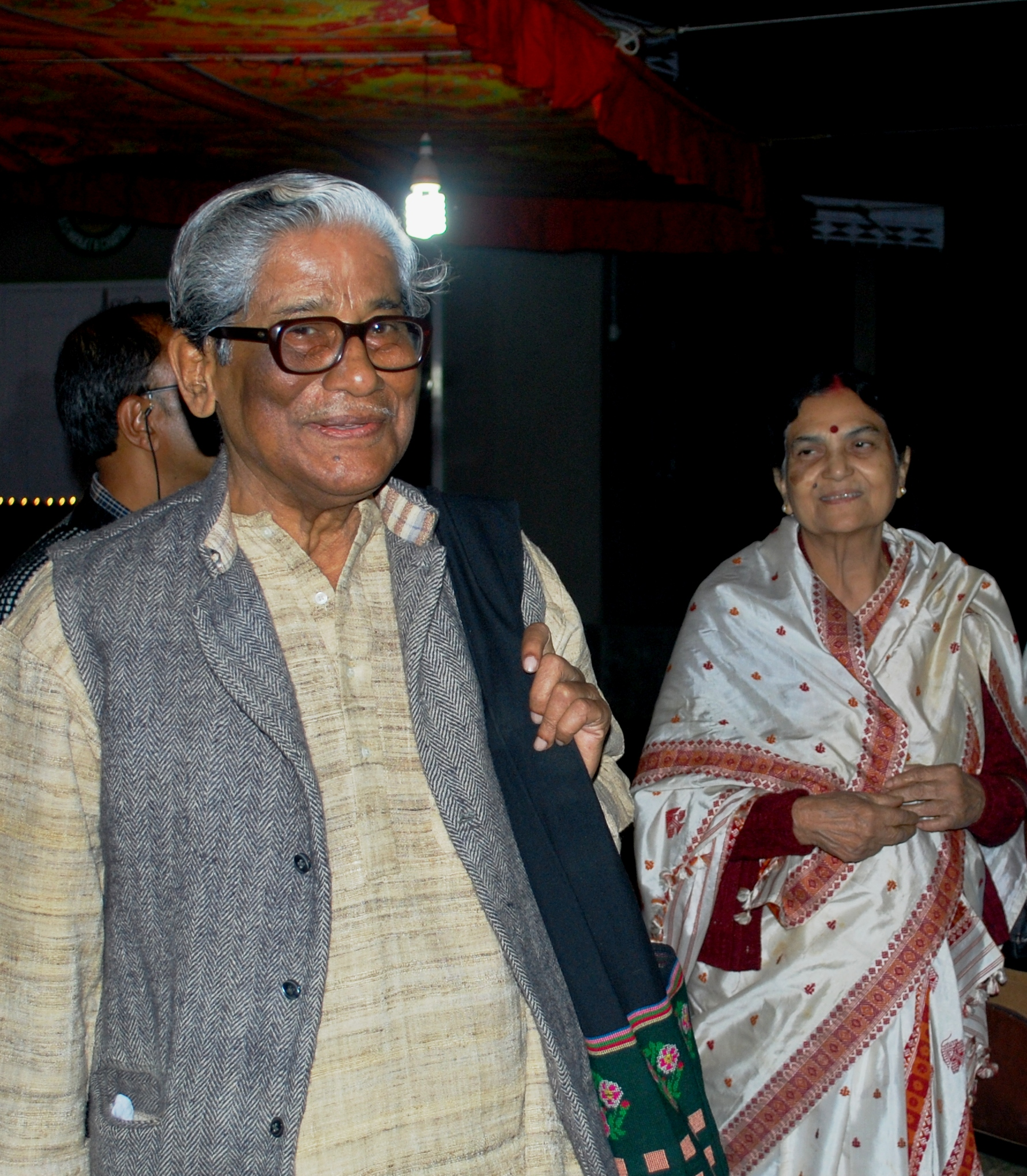
- Datta and his wife Ibha Barua
- Born: 1 March 1935; Nagaon, Assam Province, British India
- Died: 23 October 2023 (aged 88); Guwahati, Assam, India

Academic work
- Main interests: Folklore
- Notable works: Cultural Contours of Northeast India

Birendranath Datta (1 March 1935 – 23 October 2023) was an Indian academic, linguist, author, researcher of folklore, singer, and lyricist. During his career, he worked mainly as a professor in a variety of Assam colleges. In 2009, he was awarded the Padma Shri, the fourth highest civilian award, for Literature and Education, and in 2010 he received the Jagaddhatri-Harmohan Das Literary award. Datta was elected as the president of Asom Sahitya Sabha for the 2003 North Lakhimpur Session, and the 2004 Hojai Session.

== Early life ==
Birendra Nath Datta was born on 1 March 1935 in Nagaon, Assam to Kalpanath Datta, a school teacher, and Mandakini Datta. Their original home was in Panera village, near Baihata Chariali. As an Assamese academician, linguist, and folklorist, he came from a Kalita (Kayastha) caste background.

Datta started his education at Chenikuthi L.P. School in Guwahati and then studied in Goalpara. In 1933, Datta secured ranks among the top 10 in both Matriculation and I.Sc. examinations at Gauhati University. He earned his bachelor's degree at Viswabharati University and his master's degrees at Gauhati University, both in Economics.

== Career ==
In 1957, He started his career as a lecturer at B. Borooah College. In 1964, he joined Pramathesh Barua College at Gauripur in Lower Assam as the founder principal. He worked as the principal in two other colleges as well, Goalpara College and Pandu College.

In 1974, he obtained his PhD degree in Folklore under the supervision of Prafulla Dutta Goswami.

In 1979 he joined Gauhati University as a reader and later became the head of the Department of Folklore Research. After leaving Gauhati University in 1995 he joined Tezpur University as a professor in the department of Traditional Culture and Art Forms.

=== Literary career ===
Datta also wrote a number of scholarly books. One of his books, Cultural Contours of Northeast India, was published by Oxford University Press. For his book Sankar Madhavar Manisha Aru Asomar Sanaskritic Uttaradhikar, he won the 12th Jagaddhatri-Harmohan Das Literary award.

=== Music career ===
Datta was also a singer and composer. Songs set to tune by him include "Monor Khobar", "Bahudin Bokulor Gondh Poa Naai", "Meli Dilo Man", "Rohimalaa Uronir Maajere", "Sou Sirish Daalat", "Tomaar Kaarane Jaau", "Aahinak Kone Anane", "Mou Daaponar", "Sita Banabaash", "Bogoli Bogaa Phot Di Ja", "Jilir Maate", "O Ghan Chirikaa", "Barashaa Tomaar", "Aakaashe Botaahe", and "Aakaash Aamaak Akani Aakaash Diya" He also sang songs for an Assamese language film, Smrtir Parash, which was directed by Brojen Barua.

== Death ==
Birendra Nath Datta died in Guwahati on 23 October 2023, at the age of 88.

== Awards ==
- Padma Shri (2009)
- Jagaddhatri-Harmohan Das Literary award (2010)
