= Moirangthem Kirti Singh =

Indian writer and scholar (born 1943)

- Born: 1 February 1943 (age 83); Kongba Uchekon, Imphal East district, Manipur
- Occupations: Writer; Educationist
- Known for: first Meitei to be awarded a PhD and also the first Meitei to receive a DLitt; first person from Manipur to be awarded a PhD and also the first person from Manipur to receive a DLitt
- Parent: M. Borajao Singh
- Awards: Padma Shri; Jyotish Ratna (1978), Gavashana Archarya; Bharat Excellence Award; The Rising Personalities Award; Glory of India Award; Secular India Harmony Award; Netaji Subhas Chandra Bose National Award (2002)

Moirangthem Kirti Singh is an Indian writer, scholar and educationist from Manipur. Born on 1 February 1943 at Kongba Uchekon near Imphal to M. Borajao Singh, Singh completed his education from Johnstone Higher Secondary School, Imphal and D. M. College, which were under Guwahati University during those days, securing a BA (Honours) and MA in philosophy. Later, he obtained a bachelor's degree in Law (LLB) from LMS Law College, Imphal in 1965, followed by a doctoral degree (PhD) in 1972, making him one of the first Meitei to be awarded a PhD. He is also the first Meitei to receive a DLitt. He served various colleges in Manipur as a member of faculty and has also been involved in social activism.

Singh has published several books on Meitei culture and history, especially on Meiteilogy. Religious Developments in Manipur in the 18th and 19th Centuries, Religion and Culture of Manipur, Folk culture of Manipur, Recent Researches in Oriental and Indological Studies: Including Meiteilogy The philosophy and Religion, and The philosophy of Organism are some of his notable works. His selected writings were compiled and brought out as a felicitation volume by Akansha Publishing House in 2014. The Government of India awarded him the fourth highest civilian honour of the Padma Shri in 1992. Singh, a fellow of the Manipur State Kala Akademi and the Asiatic Society, Kolkata, is also a recipient of awards such as Jyotish Ratna (1978), Gavashana Archarya (1989), Bharat Excellence Award (1998), The Rising Personalities Award (1999), Glory of India Award (2000) Secular India Harmony Award (2002) and Netaji Subhas Chandra Bose National Award (2002).

== Selected bibliography ==
- Moirangthem Kirti Singh (1980). Religious Developments in Manipur in the 18th and 19th Centuries. Manipur State Kala Akadem. p. 335.
- Moirangthem Kirti Singh (1988). Religion and Culture of Manipur. Manas Publications. p. 283. ISBN 9788170490210.
- Moirangthem Kirti Singh (1993). Folk culture of Manipur. Manas Publications. p. 248. ISBN 9788170490630.
- Moirangthem Kirti Singh (1998). Recent Researches in Oriental and Indological Studies: Including Meiteilogy. Parimal Publications. p. 322.
- M. Kirti Singh (2007). The philosophy and Religion. Akansha Publications. p. 209. ISBN 978-8183700849.
- M. Kirti Singh (2009). The philosophy of Organism. Akansha Publications. p. 209. ISBN 9788183701594.

== See also ==
- Khong kangjei
- Bhaktisvarupa Damodar Swami
