= NEF College =

NEF College, Guwahati
- Motto: Knowledge Discipline Excellence
- Type: Private College
- Established: 2018 (8 years ago)
- Chairman: Zakir Hussain
- Principal: Dr. Ghanashyam Nath
- Location: Guwahati, Assam, India; 26.157°N 91.776°E
- Campus: Urban
- Calendar: Semester
- Nicknames: NEF, NEFians Assam Higher Secondary Education Council; Dibrugarh University; Gauhati University
- Website: nefcollege.com

NEF College, Guwahati, India is a private college affiliated to Assam Higher Secondary Education Council, Dibrugarh University and Gauhati University. The College admits Bachelor of Arts, Master of Arts, Bachelor of Commerce, Master of Commerce which are affiliated to Gauhati University and Bachelor of Business Administration, Master of Business Administration, Bachelor of Social Work, Master of Social Work which are affiliated to Dibrugarh University. The College is located at Lokhra Lalganesh Road, Saukuchi, Guwahati-40.

== Academic departments ==
The College offers following full-time regular courses as per as regulation of AHSEC, Gauhati University, Dibrugarh University :

- Higher Secondary (AHSEC)
- Bachelor of Arts (Gauhati University)
- Bachelor of Commerce (Gauhati University)
- Master of Commerce (Gauhati University)
- Master of Arts in Sociology (Gauhati University)
- Bachelor of Business Administration (Dibrugarh University)
- Bachelor of Social Work (Dibrugarh University)
- Masters of Business Administration (Dibrugarh University)
- Masters of Social Work (Dibrugarh University)

== Facilities ==
- Two laboratories
- Library with around 4000 books

== Ranking and reputation ==
Its Department of Social Work has been ranked 34 in all over India by India Today's "India's Best MSW Colleges 2019".

== See also ==
- NEF Law College
- Dibrugarh University
