= Pragjyotish College =

College in Assam, India

Pragjyotish College (Autonomous)
- প্ৰাগজ্যোতিষ মহাবিদ্যালয় (স্বায়ত্তশাসিত)
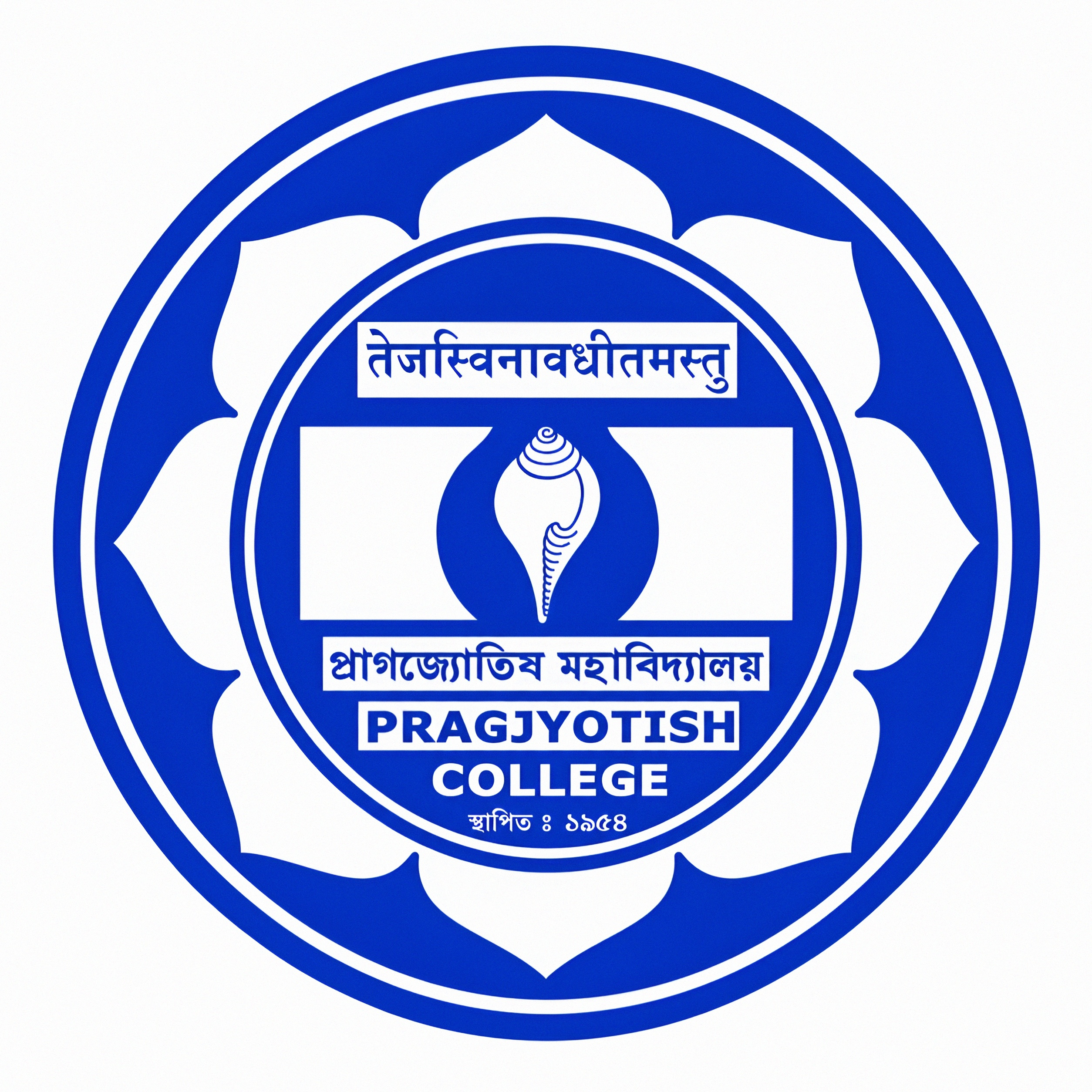
- Motto: तेजस्विनावधीतमस्तु
- Motto in English: May our study make us illumined
- Type: Public autonomous college
- Established: 1 September 1954; 72 years ago
- Accreditation: NAAC 'A' grade
- Affiliations: University of Gauhati; AHSEC
- Principal: Dr. Manoj Kumar Mahanta
- Location: Guwahati, Assam, 781009, India
- Campus: 6.55 acres; Urban
- Acronym: PC
- Approved by: UGC; AICTE
- Students Portal: pragjyotishcollege.samarth.edu.in
- Colors: Royal blue, white and navy blue
- Website: pragjyotishcollege.ac.in
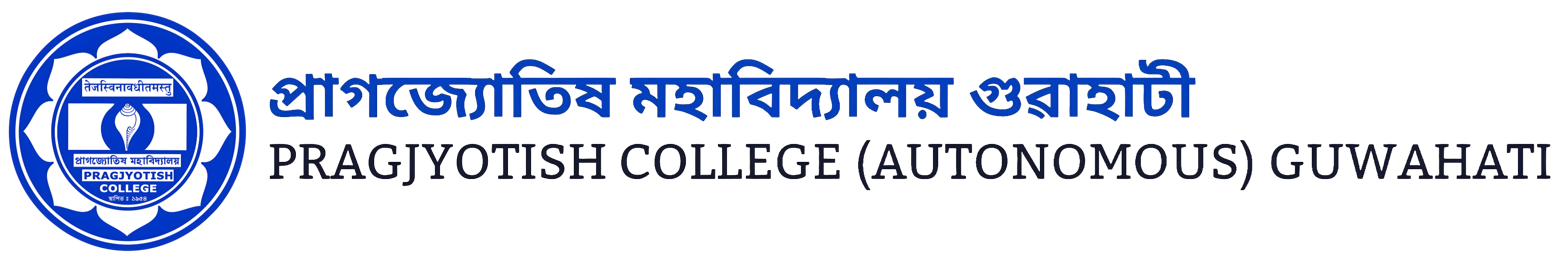

Pragjyotish College (Autonomous) established in 1954, is one of the oldest co-educational postgraduate colleges situated in Santipur locality of Guwahati, Assam. This college is affiliated with the Gauhati University.

== Accreditation ==
- Pragjyotish College was awarded an A grade with a CGPA of 3.01 in the National Assessment and Accreditation Council (NAAC) evaluation conducted on April 12th, 2025.

== Admission ==
=== Higher Secondary (HS) ===
Pragjyotish College has released the cut-off marks for admissions to the HS program for the academic year 2023–2024. The cut-off marks for the Arts stream have increased by 10% from the previous year, now set at 73% compared to last year's 63%. This change indicates a rising demand for admissions in this stream. For the Science stream, the cut-off for the general category is 82%, and for the Commerce stream, it is 62.8%. The principal of Pragjyotish College, Dr. Manoj Kumar Mahanta, noted that each stream will accommodate a total of 350 seats, resulting in an overall total of 1,050 seats across all three streams.

=== Undergraduate (UG) ===
Pragjyotish College has announced the cut-off marks for its undergraduate courses for the academic year 2023. These minimum cut-off marks provide prospective students with an indication of the scores needed for admission across various programs. For the Bachelor of Arts (BA), the minimum cut-off is set at 64.2%. In the Department of English, the cut-off mark is 79.4%, while the cut-offs for other undergraduate programs include 76% for Political Science, 63.4% for History, and 63.6% for Geography. The Bachelor of Commerce (B.Com) program requires a minimum cut-off mark of 63.8%. For the Department of Economics, the general category cut-off is 65.4%, whereas the cut-off for the Scheduled Tribe (ST) category is 56.8%. The Bachelor of Science (B.Sc) program has a higher cut-off, set at 83.2%. In the field of Anthropology, the general category cut-off stands at 63.6%. The cut-off for the ST category in both Anthropology and Chemistry is 73%, ensuring that students from this category are prioritized for admission. For the Scheduled Caste (SC) category, the cut-off mark for the Department of Chemistry is 71.2%, allowing SC students meeting this requirement to have a fair opportunity for admission.

== Seat Intake ==
Seat Availability by Course
Course	Seats
Higher Secondary (HS) Arts	300
Higher Secondary (HS) Commerce (self-financing)	300
Higher Secondary (HS) Science	300
Undergraduate (UG) Bachelor of Arts (B.A)	485
Undergraduate (UG) Bachelor of Science (B.Sc)	315
Undergraduate (UG) Bachelor of Commerce (B.Com) (self-financing)	360
Bachelor of Science (B.Sc) in Computer Science (self-financing)	50
Bachelor of Computer Applications (B.C.A) (self-financing)	60
Bachelor of Business Administration (B.B.A) (self-financing)	60
B.A (Mass Communication and Journalism)	30
Master of Tourism Management (M.T.M) (self-financing)	30
Master of Arts (M.A) in Assamese (self-financing)	50
Master of Arts/Master of Science (M.A/M.Sc) in Economics (self-financing)	20
Master of Science (M.Sc) in Zoology (self-financing)	15
Master of Science (M.Sc) in Geology (self-financing)	10
Master of Arts/Master of Science (M.A/M.Sc) in Geography (self-financing)	15
Master of Arts (M.A) in Education (self-financing)	20

Pragjyotish College has planned to introduce new academic programs, set to be operational in 2025. These additions include an M.Sc. in Botany, an M.A. in History, a B.V.A./B.F.A., and a B.A. in Performing Arts with specializations in Sattriya Dance and Hindustani Vocal.

== Campus ==
Pragjyotish College has a total campus area of approximately 6.55 acres, with a built-up area of about 1.66 acres, comprising 25% of the total campus space. It is the second-largest college of Gauhati University by area.

== Departments ==
- Accountancy
- Anthropology
- Assamese
- Bengali
- Bodo
- Botany
- Business Administration
- Chemistry
- Computer Science
- Electronic Commerce
- Economics
- Education
- English
- Environmental Studies
- Finance
- Fine Arts
- Geography
- Geology
- Hindi
- History
- Management
- Mathematics
- Performing Arts
- Philosophy
- Physics
- Political Science
- Sanskrit
- Statistics
- Tourism Management
- Zoology

== Courses ==
=== Online Certificate Programmes ===
- SWAYAM-NPTEL Local Chapter (6132) under NPTEL-IIT Madras

=== Distance Education Programmes ===
- Programs under K.K.H.S.O.U.
- Programs under GU-CODOE
- Programs under I.G.N.O.U.

=== Departments/ Centers offering Certificate Programmes ===
- Sanskrit
- Skill and multidisciplinary programmes / Add-on Courses
- Nodal Centre for skill training and Japanese Learning in collaboration with Mirai Japanese Learning Centre (authorized center by NSDC)

=== Department's Diploma Programs ===
- Fine Arts
- Performing Arts
- Sanskrit

=== Undergraduate ===
- Higher Secondary (Science, Commerce, Arts)
- B.Sc
- B.Com
- B.A
- B.C.A
- B.B.A
- B.Sc.-B.Ed.

=== Postgraduate ===
- Assamese
- Economics
- Education
- Geography
- Geology
- Tourism Management
- Zoology

== Prospectus ==
SESSION 2026-27

SESSION 2025-26

SESSION 2024-25

SESSION 2023-24

SESSION 2022-23

SESSION 2021-22

SESSION 2020-21

SESSION 2019-20

== History ==
Pragjyotish College was established on 1 September 1954, as the first higher education institution in Guwahati after India's independence. Over its seven decades of existence, it has grown into a prominent postgraduate college, offering education in 27 departments, including seven postgraduate programs. The college celebrated its Diamond Jubilee in 2014 and has produced numerous notable alumni from various fields. It is recognized under Sections 2(f) and 12(B) of the University Grants Commission (India) and has been accredited by National Assessment and Accreditation Council for the periods 2004–2009, 2011–2016, and 2021–2026. The college has been granted autonomous status by UGC on 24th July 2026.^{[10]}
