= Elangbam Nilakanta Singh =

Indian writer

- Born: 4 October 1927; Keisamthong Elangbam Leikai, Imphal, Manipur, India
- Died: 11 February 2000 (aged 72)
- Occupation: Writer
- Known for: Literature
- Awards: Padma Shri (2000); Sahitya Akademi Award (1987)

Elangbam Nilakanta Singh (1927–2000) was an Indian poet and critic, considered by many as one of the pioneers of modern Meitei literature. A recipient of the Sahitya Akademi Award in 1987, Nilakanta Singh was honored by the Government of India, in 2000, with the fourth highest Indian civilian award of Padma Shri.

== Biography ==
Elangbam Nilakanta Singh was born at Keisamthong Elangbam Leikai in the capital of the Indian state of Manipur on 4 October 1927 to Lakhi Devi and Elangbam Bokul Singh, a primary school teacher, as the eldest of their eight children. He did early schooling at Churachandpur and continued at Johnstone Higher Secondary School, Imphal from where he passed the matriculation in 1945. His pre university studies were at Murarichand College, Sylhet, in the present day Bangladesh and later, graduated in arts (BA) from Gauhati University. He secured a post graduate degree of MA in Philosophy and LLB also from the same university.

Singh started his career as a lecturer at D. M. College, Manipur in 1953 where he rose in ranks as a senior lecturer and the Head of the department. He worked as the Director of the Department of Social Welfare, the Government of India from which position he retired in 1986. He was also a consultant at Manipur University in 1989, Senior Fellow of the Government of India in 1989 and a member of faculty of Philosophy at Manipur University from 1996 to 1997. He was the general secretary of Manipur Sahitya Parishad for two terms, in 1958 and from 1964 till 1968, the president during 1993-94 and the executive member till his death in 2000. He was also involved with several other cultural societies such as Naharol Sahitya Premi Samiti, Geeta Mandal, Jawaharlal Nehru Dance Academy, Manipur Cultural Forum, Arabindo Society, Mutua Museum and Divine Life Society. Nilakanta Singh represented the Indian cultural delegation in many overseas visits to countries such as Hungary, Germany and France under the Indo European Cultural Exchange Programme in 1971.

Singh has authored several publications which included poems, critical studies, travelogues and historical and cultural essays. Some of his notable works are:

- Tīrtha yātrā (poems)
- Matamagī wākhala (poems)
- Catlasine kadāidano ibāni (poems)
- Manipuri Seirang' (poems)
- Aspects of Indian culture (critical study)
- Saṃskr̥tigī śaklona (articles on culture and religion)
- Aikhoẏada haujika Rabīndranātha (essays on Rabindranath Tagore)
- Parishadakī Maṇipurī śaireṃ lāirika (poems)
- Manipuri dances (essays)
- Fragments of Manipuri Culture (essays)
- Achaiba lei (poems)
- Manipuri Kabitagi Chhanda Neinaba
- Houjiki Sahitya Amasung Sanskriti (essays)
- Monograph on Bhadra
- Monograph on Pandit Atombapu Sharma
- America ka unaba (travelogue)
- America Gi Esai (poems)

He was awarded the Sahitya Akademi Award for his book Tīrtha yātrā in 1987. In 2000, the Government of India honoured him with the civilian award of Padma Shri. Nilakanta Singh died on 11 February 2000, before the Padma Award investiture ceremony could take place.

== See also ==
- Meitei literature
