= Rangia College =

College in Assam, India

Coordinates: 26.4272°N 91.6147°E

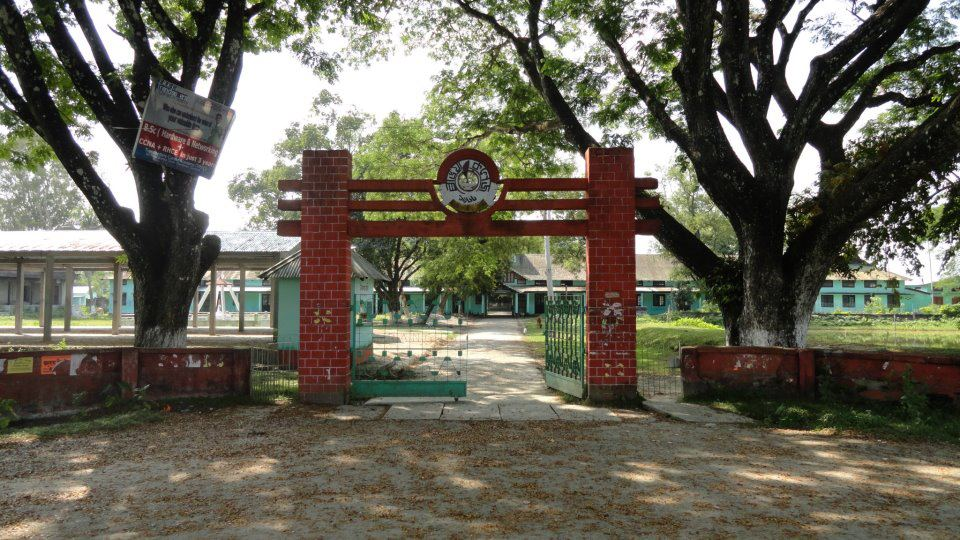
- Type: Government
- Established: 5 August 1963; 63 years ago
- Academic affiliations: Gauhati University
- President: Bhabendra Nath Deka
- Principal: Brajendra Saikia
- Administrative staff: 33
- Location: Rangia, Assam, India
- Campus: Semi-urban
- Website: www.rangiacollege.org
- Location within Assam Location within India

Rangia College is an institution of general higher education established on the north bank of the Brahmaputra River. It is located in Rangiya, a city in the kamrup rural district of Assam.

== History ==
Rangia College has been serving and providing educational opportunities for the North Kamrup area, which is primarily a rural base. Birendra Bordoloi, son of Gopinath Bordoloi, was Principal in 1990s.

== Academics ==
Rangia college offers undergraduate and postgraduate courses. All undergraduate courses commencing according to the three-year undergraduate honours degree system.

=== Undergraduate courses ===
Undergraduate courses are as follows:

- B.A Programme
- B.A. Honours: Assamese, Arabic, Bodo, English, Political Science, History, Philosophy, Sanskrit, Education, Economics, Geography
- B.Com Programme
- B.Com. Honours: Accountancy, Finance, Management, Acountancy I & II, Principal of Economics, Eco Development & Planning India, Business Organization, Cooperative Finance, Money Banking & Trade, Practice of Banking
- B.Sc. Programme
- B.Sc.Honours: Botany, Chemistry, Mathematics, Physics, Zoology, Computer Application & IT, Geography, Statistics

=== Postgraduate courses ===
Arabic, Assamese, Bodo, Botany, Economics, Education, English & Sanskrit

=== Self financing ===
BCA, BBA, BPES, PGDCA

=== Vocational ===
RMIT, CTHM, MLT, TTM

== Facilities ==
=== Women's Studies Research Cell ===
The Women's Studies Research Cell at Rangia College was established in 2004 under the guidance of the Women's Studies Research Cell at Gauhati University. The Cell publishes a biannual ISBN Journal since 2010, titled Pratibhan, which serves as a platform for scholarly contributions in the field of women's studies.

=== Library ===
Rangia College library is a library of higher education in Assam, playing a role in conferring higher education to the user of North Kamrup. The central library of the college has been functioning as an part of the college from time of its inception. At this time of its inception the primary needs of the library were fulfilled with the help of donation and contribution of some well wishers and thereafter gradually it is able to become a modern computerized college library.

== See also ==
- Gauhati University
- Pub Kamrup College
- Rangia Higher Secondary School
