= Amarjyoti Choudhury =

Indian educationist (born 1950)

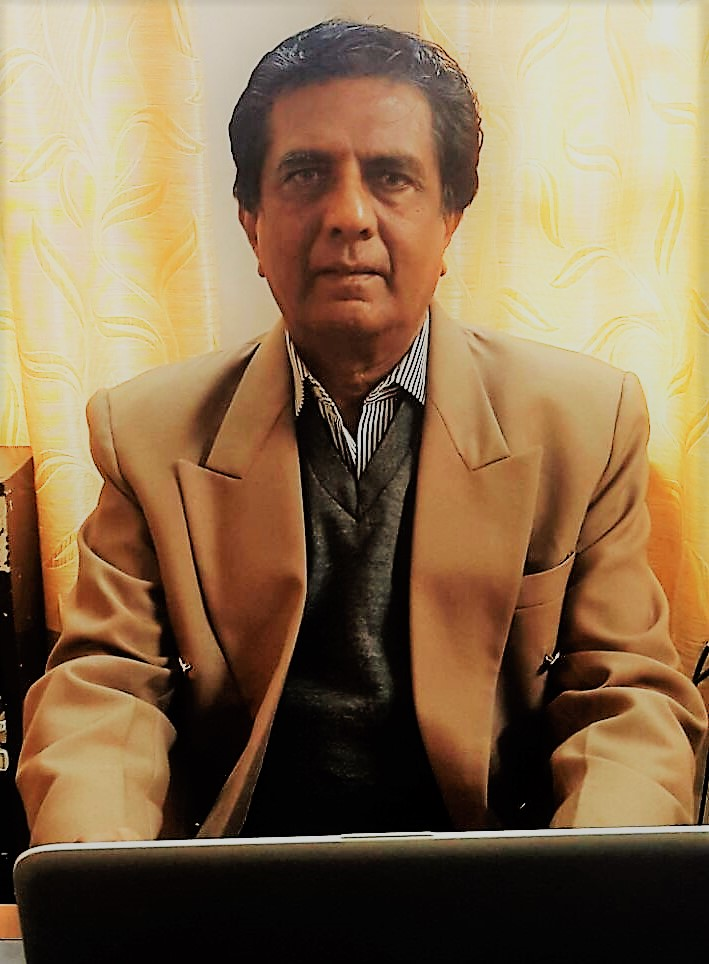
- Born: 1950 (age 75–76); Dibrugarh, Assam, India
- Education: Oxford University (PhD); Delhi University (MS); Gauhati University (BS)
- Occupations: Educationist; scientist; actor; reciter; playwright; poet; novelist; orator

Amarjyoti Choudhury (born 1950) is an Indian educationist, scientist, actor, reciter, playwright, poet, novelist, orator and editor. He is a former Vice Chancellor of Gauhati University and a former Pro-Vice Chancellor of Tezpur University. After superannuation from Tezpur University, he occupied the C. V. Raman Chair of Applied Physics and later served as Vice Chancellor of University of Science and Technology, Meghalaya. He was also the Vice Chancellor of Assam down town University from 1 December 2017 to 31 August 2020. He also served as the Editor of renowned Assamese daily Dainik Asam for a short period. Currently, he is Professor Emeritus and Chair Professor, Dr. Bhupen Hazarika Centre for Creativity at The Assam Royal Global University.

== Early life ==
Born in Dibrugarh, Assam to Lakshyadhar Choudhury, the renowned litterateur, playwright and actor with socialist leaning and Usha Choudhury, a committed Gandhian, Amarjyoti is the eldest of five siblings. He topped the High School Leaving Examination of the entire state of Assam. A graduate with Honours in Physics from Gauhati University, he did his Masters in Physics from Delhi University. Next he obtained his doctorate degree from University of Oxford.

== Career ==
=== Teaching career ===
Choudhury has taught at Jorhat Engineering College, Cotton College, BITS Pilani, Gauhati University and Tezpur University. He has acted as visiting professor to European Laboratory for Non linear Spectroscopy and Nuclear Science Centre, New Delhi (now known as Inter-University Accelerator Centre – IUAC), P.N Lebedev Institute Moscow, University of Southampton and Polytechnic University of Bucharest. .

=== Research contribution ===
A researcher in Optics, Quantum Electronics, Condensed Matter Physics Nanophotonics and Nanotechnology. He is credited with 148 research papers in peer reviewed National and International Journals. So far, twenty scholars have received doctorate degree with his expert guidance.

A theoretical paper jointly authored by Choudhury along with his supervisor CJR Sheppard dwelt extensively on confocal geometry of scanning laser microscopy. It is probably the first publication using the technical term 'confocal microscopy'.

=== As a scientific communicator ===
Choudhury has regularly contributed as a scientific communicator. He is a noted author on scientific themes in a number of Assamese dailies and magazines. He was commissioned by National Book Trust for translating three books on scientific themes from English to Assamese. These are Ramanujan, Satyendra Nath Basu and The Shrinking Universe. He has also authored a book on Nanotechnology which is published by the Assam Science Society.

=== Contribution in cultural field ===
Choudhury was a child actor in two Assamese films, namely Mak aru Morom and Amar Ghar. He also created his own space in Assamese Theatre as actor, director and playwright. Choudhury's rendition of the self composed poem on the death of Bhupen Hazarika is regarded as a milestone in the world of recitation.

=== Literary contribution ===
His trilogy of plays, titled Bhoyor Tongighorot Tora has been well received. His collection of poems, titled Etiya Tezot and Aan Ekura Meji has received good reviews. Rupantorot Moi and Enekoiye Rupantarot Moi his autobiographical piece on his childhood has been recognised as a hit. He has also authored two notable novels in Assamese language. The first one, titled Gosor Nisina Sankokhon had a strong presence of feminist and environmental perspective. The next one titled Rodkasholir Manuh is marked by a postmodern absurdist sensibility. His trilogy of novels on Covid days namely, Ushahor Majot, Aan Ekhon Aranyat, Mukhar Dore captures the trauma of the period in exquisite details. Jetiya Surya Heral has a cultural twist and vision amidst prevailing atmosphere of tension.

=== Orator and a quizmaster ===
He was notable in the quizzing scenario of the eighties and nineties in Assam along with Professor Dilip Baruah.

== Personal life ==
In 1978 Choudhury married Kaberi, the youngest daughter of cultural-personality Tilak Das and singer of her times, Chandra Prabha Das. They have a daughter, Amrita and a son, Arunav.
