= Tarabhusan Pal Junior College =

College in Assam

- Type: Private
- Established: 2003
- Principal: Mr. Ram Mohan Das
- Location: Karimganj, Assam, India; 24°52′32″N 92°21′43″E
- Affiliations: AHSEC
- Website: https://www.kjcs2003.org/

Tarabhusan Pal Junior College, formerly known as Karimganj Junior College of Science, established in 2003, is a major college situated in Nilmoni Road, Karimganj, Assam. This college is affiliated with the AHSEC. (Recognition No. AHSEC/RPR/RRC/60/07/1904). Class XI and XII students are taught here in Science, Arts and Commerce.

== Departments ==
=== Science ===
- Physics
- Chemistry
- Mathematics
- Biology
- Computer Science & Application
- Statistics

=== Commerce ===
- Business Studies
- Accountancy
- Commercial Mathematics & Statistics

=== Arts ===
- Bengali
- English
- History
- Economics
- Political Science
- Logic & Philosophy
