= Okhil Kumar Medhi =

Scientist and former Vice-chancellor of Gauhati University, Assam, India

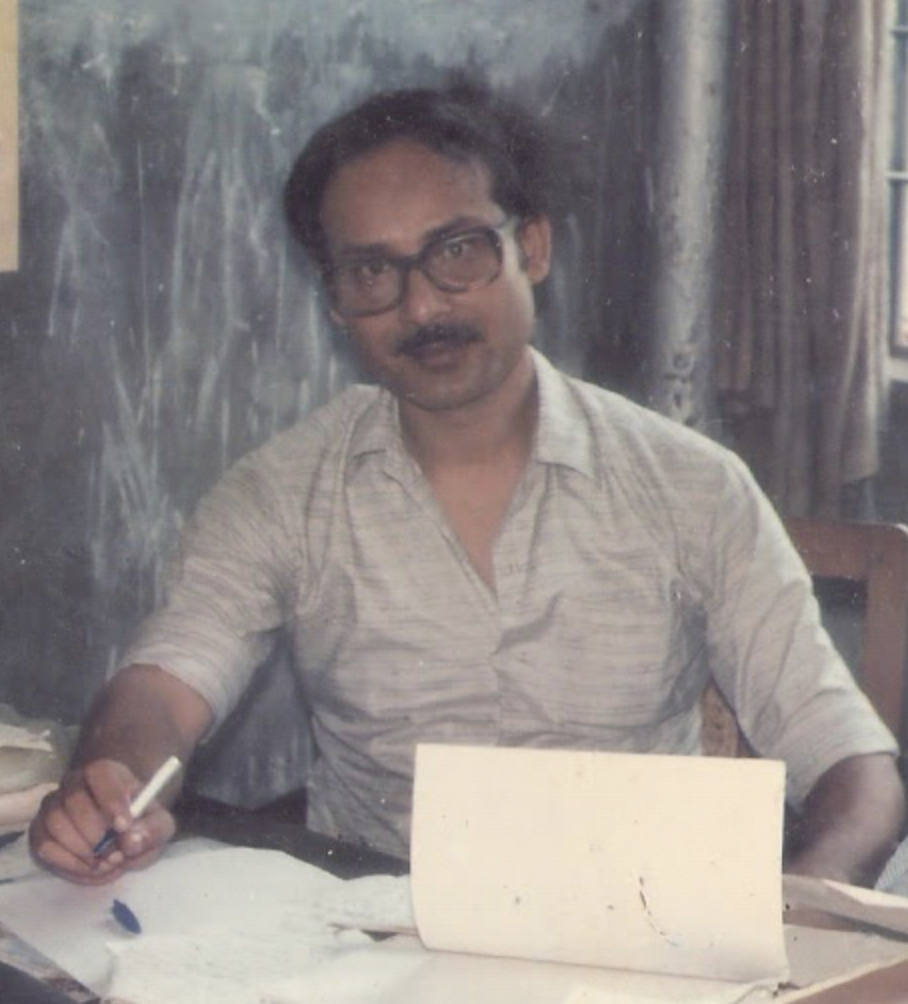
- Okhil Kumar Medhi during his early years at the Department of Chemistry, Gauhati University
- Education: IIT Kanpur (MS, PhD); Cotton University (BS)
- Scientific career
- Fields: Chemistry
- Workplaces: Gauhati University, North-Eastern Hill University, Tata Institute of Fundamental Research

Okhil Kumar Medhi (1951-2021) was an Indian chemist and academic. He is best known for his time as the Vice-chancellor of Gauhati University in Guwahati, Assam, where he was also a professor of inorganic chemistry and former Head of Department in the university's chemistry department. After completing a Ph.D. at the Indian Institute of Technology Kanpur, Medhi undertook research at both the Tata Institute of Fundamental Research (as a visiting fellow) and North-Eastern Hill University (as a lecturer), but spent much of his academic career at Gauhati University. His scientific work has been varied but has included contributions to the fields of inorganic chemistry and carbon nanoparticles.

During his time as Vice-Chancellor, Medhi made notable contributions to the development of Gauhati University, including overseeing the creation of the university's Institute of Science and Technology (GUIST). He additionally advocated for holistic and skill-based education especially in the university, and extending support to colleges across the state of Assam.

== Early life and education ==
Okhil Kumar Medhi completed his early years of education at Don Bosco High School, a private education institute. Showing a particular interest in chemistry, Medhi attended Cotton College, and thereafter he studied for a Master's degree in Chemistry at the Indian Institute of Technology Kanpur (IIT Kanpur) in Kanpur, Uttar Pradesh. His doctoral thesis was on the electron paramagnetic resonance of heavy transition metals and was supervised by Professor UC Agarwal at IIT Kanpur.

== Career ==
Medhi's first research position following his doctoral studies was as a visiting fellow at the Tata Institute of Fundamental Research in Mumbai, India. This was followed by an academic appointment as lecturer at North-Eastern Hill University in Shillong. In 1983, Medhi was appointed as a Reader of Chemistry at Gauhati University where he spent the majority of his career. He took a brief sabbatical from this position to undertake a visiting position as a Commonwealth Fellow at the University of Essex in the United Kingdom.

Upon his return to Gauhati University, Medhi was promoted to a full professorship and eventually became the Head of Department between 2000 and 2003. During his tenure as Head of Department, Medhi secured funding from the Government of India's Department of Science and Technology to help the department modernise itself.

Later in his career, Medhi was elected as the Vice-Chancellor of Gauhati University. During his time as Vice-Chancellor, Medhi advocated for significant change in the Assamese education system, including promoting the teaching of science. His notable contribution includes leading the creation of the Gauhati University Institute of Science and Technology.

Aside from his academic profile, Medhi's scientific research focussed predominantly on bioinorganic chemistry and nanoparticles. He contributed to several academic papers and is a co-author of Inorganic Chemistry – Principles of Structure and Reactivity, a reference textbook for chemistry students. He was also an advisor to several doctoral students during his career.

== Personal life ==
Medhi resided for most of his life in north-east India, mostly in Guwahati, the capital city of the state of Assam. He married Chitrani Medhi, also a chemistry professor, with whom he had two daughters.
