= Handique Girls College =

College in Assam

- Former name: Guwahati Girls College
- Type: Public
- Established: 1939; 87 years ago
- Affiliations: University of Gauhati
- Principal: Ranjit Sarma
- Undergraduates: 19 Departments
- Location: Guwahati, Assam, India
- Campus: Urban, total 2 acres (0.0081 km^{2})
- Website: www.hgcollege.edu.in

Handique Girls College or Guwahati Girls College is a constituent college of the University of Gauhati. It is one of the oldest colleges located in the Indian state of Assam and offers undergraduate courses in Arts and Science.

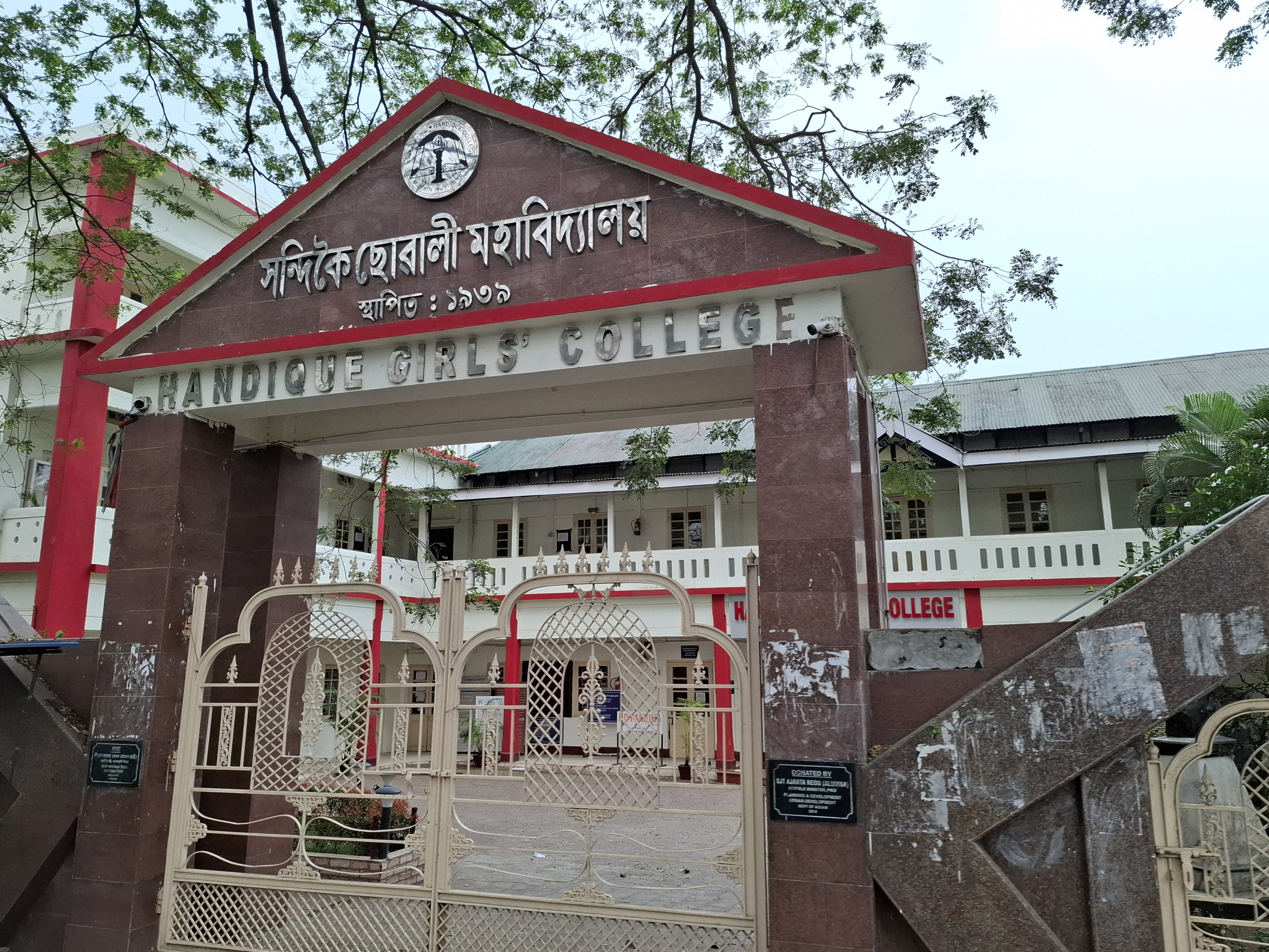
Handique Girls College gate

== History ==
The college has its roots initially as Panbazar Girls' High school. Subsequently, the Handique Girls College was established in 1939 as the Guwahati Girls College. Mrs Rajabala Das was the founder principal of the college. The college was initially located in the Panbazar area of the city. With the shifting to the present site in 1940, the college was renamed Handique Girls College (in honour of noted philanthropist R. K. Handique), and became affiliated to the University of Calcutta. The college later became affiliated to the University of Gauhati following its establishment in 1948.

=== College principals ===
The college has had eleven principals:

Year	Principal	Note
1939–1965	Rajabala Das	
1965–1974	Sarat Chandra Goswami	
1974–1984	Ameda Rasul	
1984–1992	Ratna Kanta Baruah	
1994–2000	Gagan Chandra Baruah	
2004-2014	Indira Bardoloi	
2015 – 2022	Utpal Dutta	
2023 -	Ranjit Sarma	

== Campus ==
The college is situated on the western bank of the Dighalipukhuri in Guwahati. The present campus is spread over two acre of land. The Government of Assam has allocated an additional four acre of land for future expansion.

=== Student accommodation ===
The Nirmal Prova Bordoloi Hostel is situated just opposite to the college campus on the eastern side of the Dighalipukhuri. It is a three storied building with additional residential complex for Hostel Super and other staff members.

== Departments ==
The college has eighteen departments offering major and general courses. The college offers courses of study in both Arts and Science faculties up to Degree Major level. The medium of instruction is English. However, Assamese is also used as complementary to English. Conforming to the national pattern of education, 10+2+3 structure is followed in the state of Assam and the Three Year Degree Course (TDC) has been introduced from the 1984-85 session.

== Festivals ==
The college celebrates two major festivals during the annual session:

- Freshers Social
- Saraswati Puja
- Cultural week followed by Cultural Night

== Student Union ==
The Handique Girls College Students Union is the general body of the students of the college. Its membership is compulsory for every student admitted into the college. The office bearers of the Union are elected annually through direct ballot.

The Students' Union organizes various activities mainly Games and Sports, Debate, Cultural items and Social Service among the students. It also brings out a magazine annually as a medium for developing the potentialities of students.

== Notable alumni ==
- Rajni Basumatary, Film maker and actress
- Shakuntala Choudhary — social worker.
- Mamoni Raisom Goswami, writer
- Sudakshina Sarma — Assamese language singer and musician.
