= Rangia Higher Secondary School =

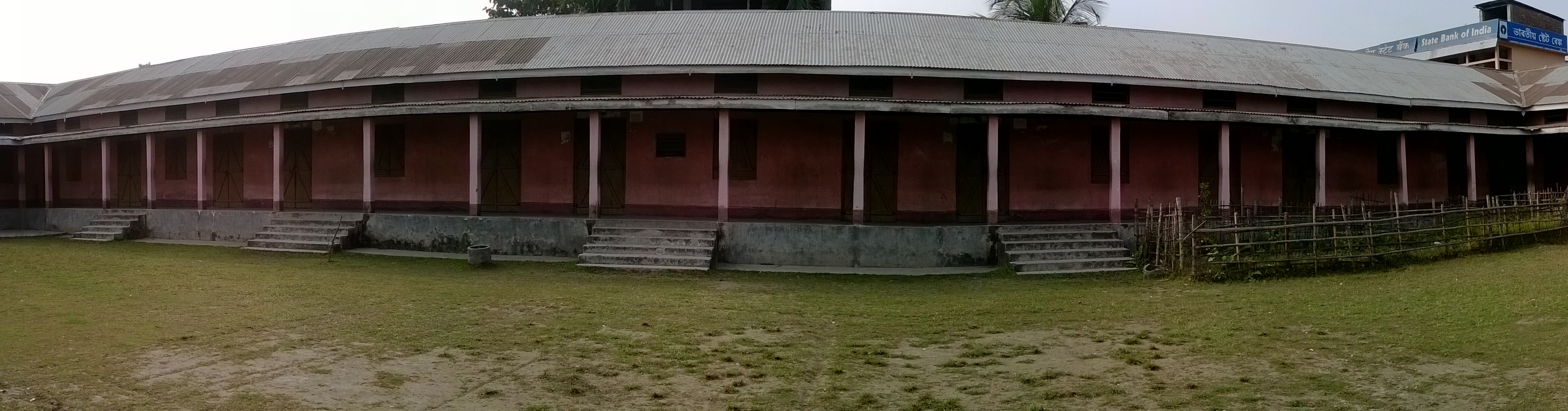

Location
- Rangia, Assam; India; 26°26′12″N 91°37′10″E

Information
- Motto: বিদ্যাং দেহি সৰস্বতী (Assamese)
- Established: 1936
- Principal: Mr. Dipak Kalita
- Staff: 67
- Enrollment: 1286±80
- Campus: Urban
- Acronym: RHSS

Rangia Higher Secondary School is a higher secondary school in Rangia city of Assam. It was established in 1936. The school is located at the heart of Rangia at Mahatma Gandhi road. The current student strength is 1286 with 67 faculty members. It is an Assamese medium school. The students of the 10th standard appear in HSLC examination under SEBA and the students of the 12th standard appear in HSLC examination under Assam Higher Secondary Education Council.

== History ==
=== Laghunram minor school ===
On 5 January 1917, some donation from the public were raised with the effort of some persons to establish a minor school named as Laghanuram Minor School, in the memory of Lt. Laghanuram Choudhury. It is stated that Lt. Laghanuram Choudhury donated a Thousand rupees for the establishment of the school and he was the Secretary of the managing committee too. Lt. Bibhav Chandra Mazumdar was enrolled as the Head Master of the school. But as he had to transfer himself to another place for higher studies, Lt. Santiram Lahkar was given the responsibility as the new Head Master. As Santiram Lahkar was condemned to prison in the Freedom Movement, the post of the Head Master was again enrolled for Lt. Gopikanta Kalita.In 1925, Mohan Chandra Choudhury took the responsibility and served the post of the Head Master till it succeeded from a Minor school to High school.

=== Rangia High school ===
In accordance to a general meeting, a decision was taken to change the Minor school to a High school and a High madrasa separately in 1936. Mohan Chandra Choudhury, Lakshiram Choudhury and Siddhinath Sarma were among the names who contributed in this field. The class of the High school was started on 3 March 1936 with Muktaram Kalita as the Head Master; on the same day, the first class of High Madrasa was also taken in the leadership of Nuruddin Ahmed. The classes of High Madrasa were going on at the same place as present and that of the High school were going on in the Balika school belonging to that time. In 1937, when the two schools were united, the classes were shifted to the Primary Moktab of Rangia. The classes were also taken in the house of Lt. Chidananda Bhatacharya temporarily. Although the son of Lt.Laghunram Choudhury, Lt.Lakshiram Choudhury donated 2500 rupees, his brothers unable to donate those money when Lakshiram Choudhury unfortunately went mentally imbalanced which resulted the name of Laghunram High School replaced by Rangia High School.

=== Separation of high school and high madrasa ===
Dhaka Board of Intermediate And Secondary Education said that it would de-recognize the High Madrasa Section if the school authorities fail to manage separate managing committees, teaching stuffs and funds for the High School and the High Madrasa. This resulted in foundation of a managing committee separately for High Madrasa on 12 July 1945 and the High Madrasa was also established separately in 1947. On the other hand, in May 1948 the chief minister of Assam Gopinath Bordoloi inaugurated the High School officially.

=== Addition of higher secondary sections ===
In 1978, after many fights with the Government, the then Head Master Jogendranath Kalita with two former presidents of the Rangia Municipality Durgadutta Agarwala and Nikunjalal Choudhury respectively were able to add the Higher Secondary Science stream in the High school. In 1982, the Art stream was also added. Presently, in addition to Art and Science stream, the Commerce stream is also unfastened for the students.

== Present ==
Presently High School Section of Rangia Higher Secondary School consists of five classes starting from Sixth to Tenth standard and each having two sections. On the other hand, the Higher Secondary section consists of the three streams-Science, Arts and Commerce. One of the busy roads of Rangia, M.G. Road is situated on the North side of this school, Jawaharlal Nehru Sishu Bidyalaya, an LP School, on the East and residential areas on the South and West side of the school. In addition to enormous floras, a lake is also situated for fisheries inside the campus of the school.

== Gallery ==
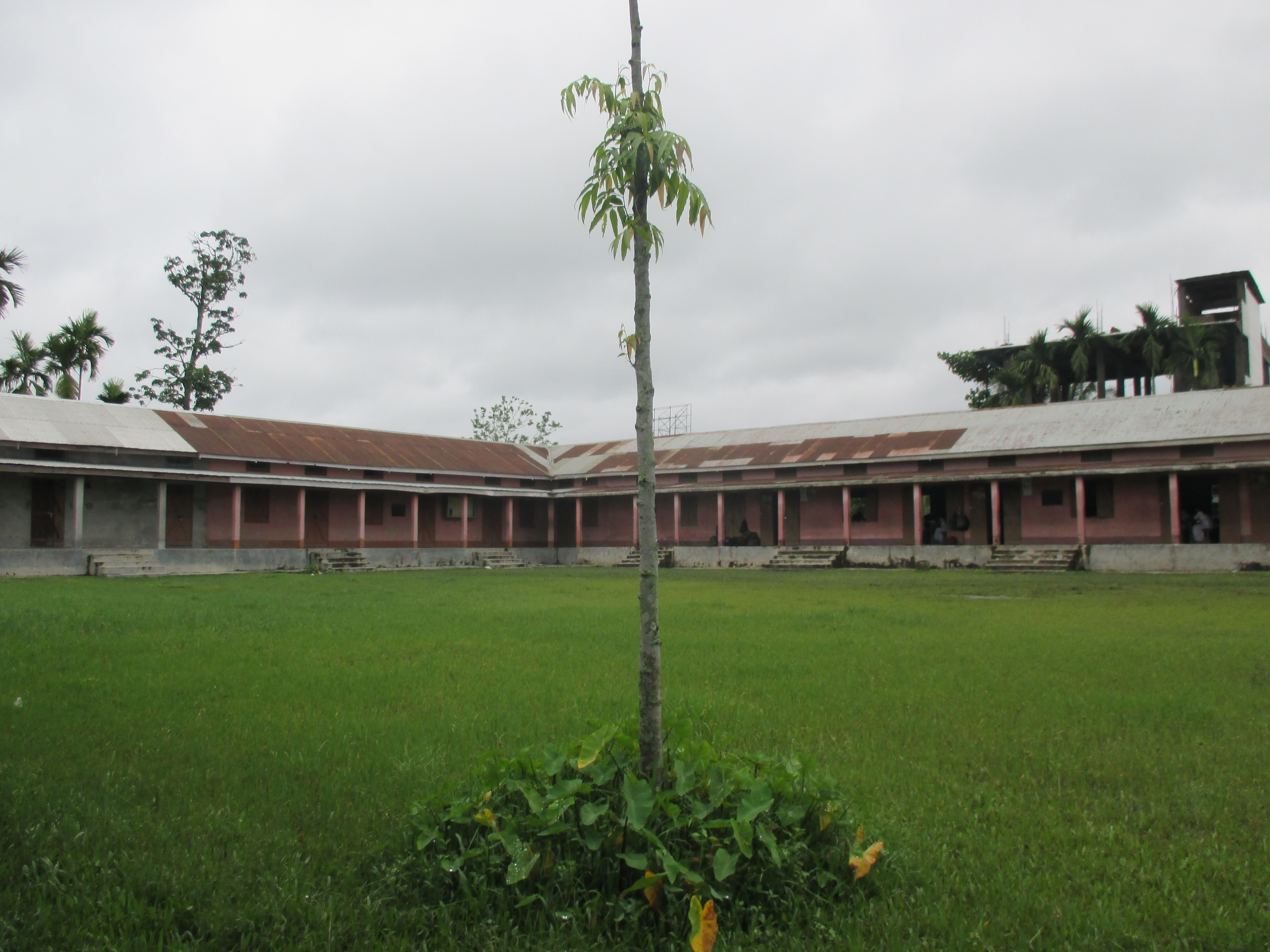
A section of School Campus

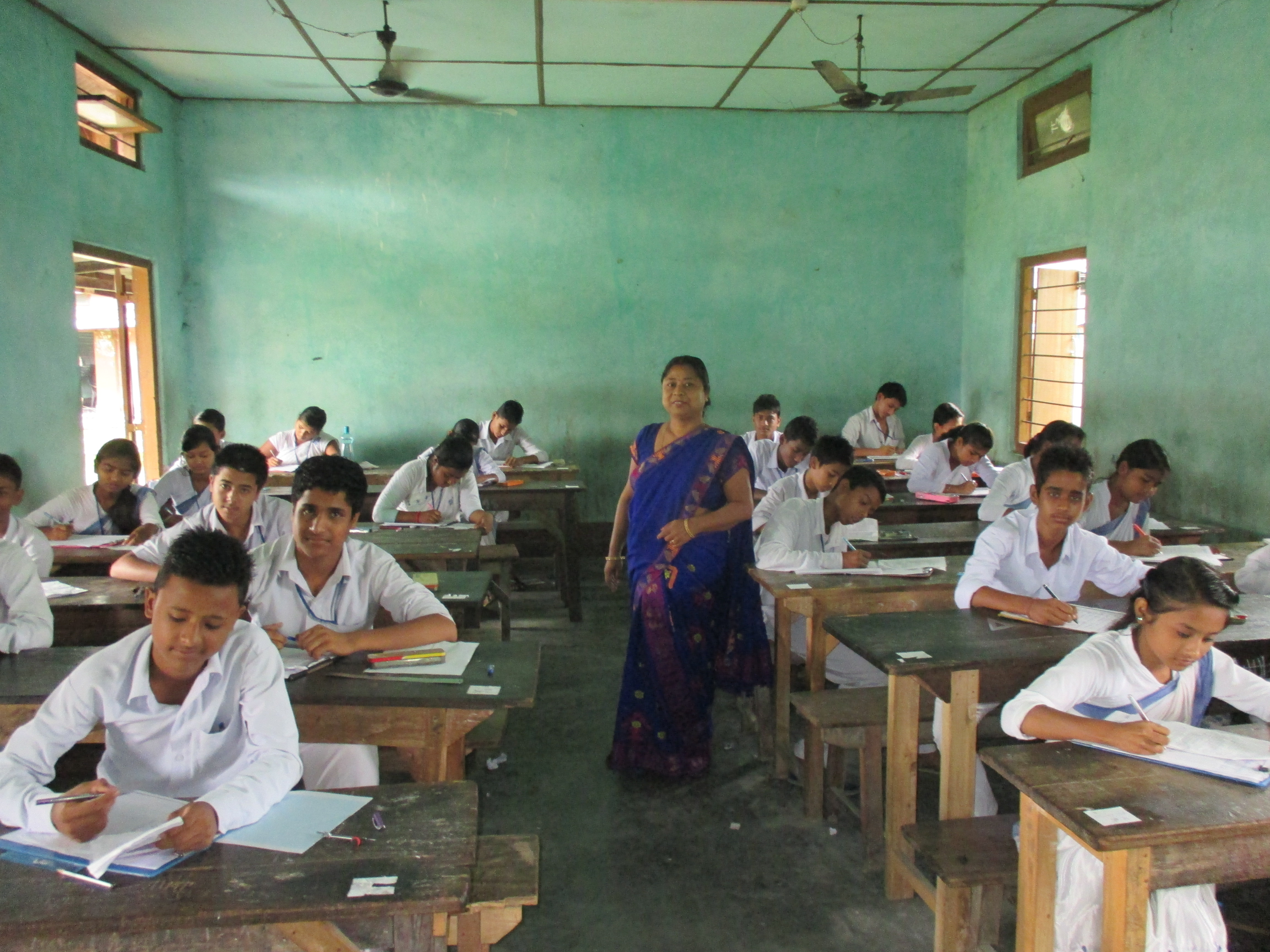
Classroom

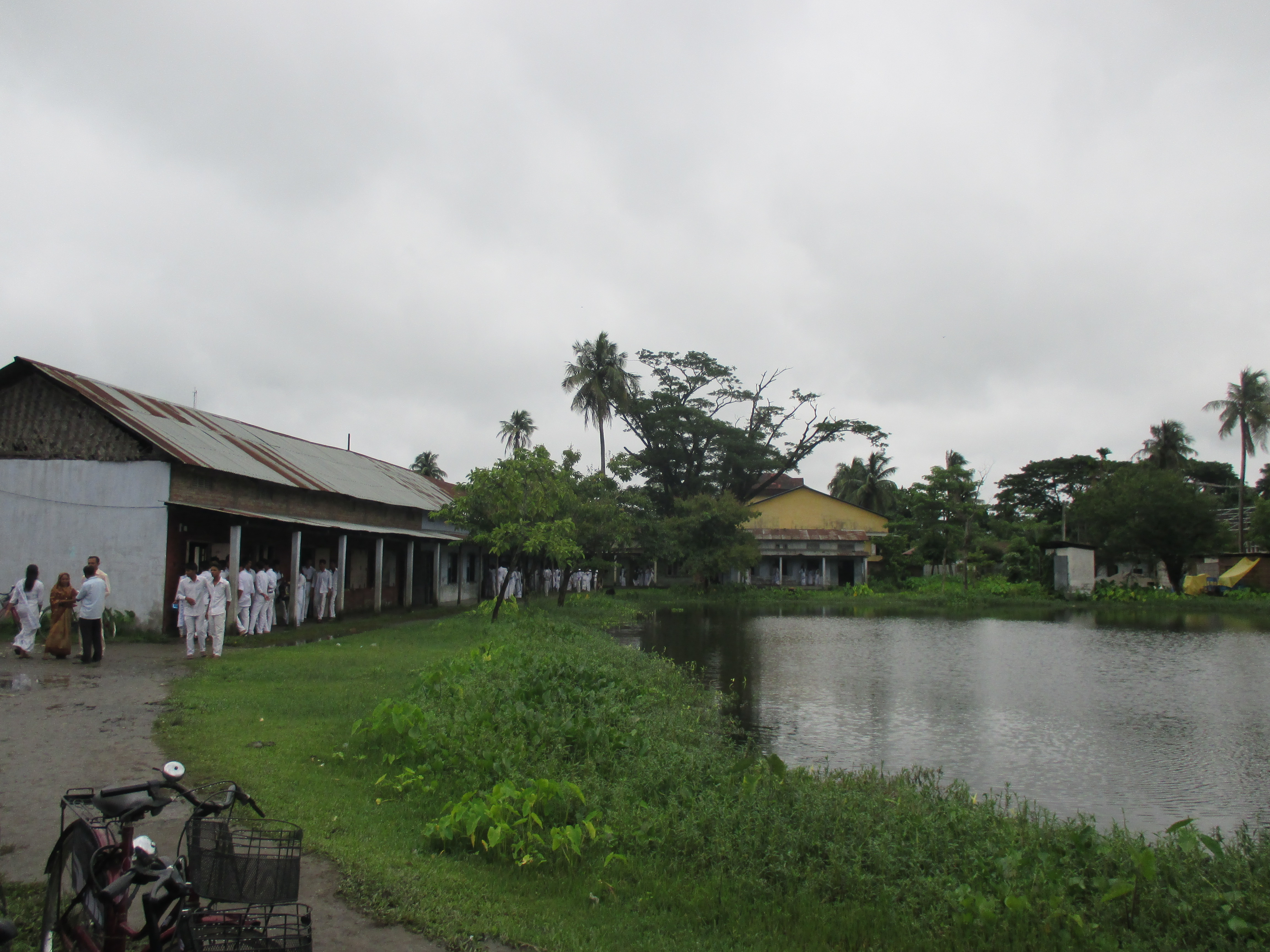
A section of the School fishery
