= B.H. College =

College in Assam

- Type: Undergraduate college
- Established: 1966
- Affiliations: Gauhati University
- Principal: Dr. Bhushan Ch. Pathak
- Location: Howly, Barpeta district, Assam, India
- Website: bhcollege.in

B.H. College is an undergraduate college established in the year 1966 at Howly of Barpeta district in Assam. The college is affiliated to Gauhati University. The college also offers M.Com. Regular course under GU.

== Accreditation ==
In 2016 the college has been awarded "A" grade with CGPA 3.11 by National Assessment and Accreditation Council. The college is also recognised by University Grants Commission (India).
