= Nagaon GNDG Commerce College =

Coordinates: 26.3527°N 92.7069°E

- Type: Public
- Established: 24 September 1984; 41 years ago
- Principal: Dr. Mriganka Saikia
- Location: Nagaon, Assam, India
- Affiliations: Gauhati University
- Website: Official website

Nagaon GNDG Commerce College is a commerce college situated in Panigaon, Nagaon. The college is affiliated with Gauhati University.

== Under-Graduate ==
=== B.Com. Semester Courses ===
Major Courses are in the subject of Accountancy, Management and Finance. The course consists of three academic years with two semesters in each academic year.

=== BBA Course ===
Course compromises of 3 academic years and each academic year consists of 2 semesters. Each semester shall approximately consist of 19 weeks of teaching.

=== B.Sc Course ===
"B.Sc. with Major in Physics, Chemistry, Zoology, Botany and Mathematics under Gauhati University will be started from next session 2020-2021 as per the Govt. of Assam notification."

== History ==
Nagaon Gopinath Dev Goswami Commerce College is the only full-fledged institution of higher education in commerce, in the entire central Assam region. The college was started on 24 September 1984 on the premises of Sankardev Natya Chora under the name of Nagaon Commerce College. It was renamed as Nagaon GNDG Commerce College. after the name of late Gopinath Dev Goswami, an illustrious son of Nagaon and was shifted to its present site at Panigaon, Nagaon in 1991. The college owes its existence to the pioneering work of its founder President late Ratnakanta Bora, Rtd. I.A.S. and the founder-principal Sjt Kamal Chandra Goswami and the donations of the family of the late Gopinath Dev Goswami. Starting with only 139 students in the year of its inception, the college has blossomed into an institution for commerce education with a sizable number of students in its rolls every year. This College is affiliated with Gauhati University, Guwahati (not an Autonomous College)
