= Gauhati University =

University in Guwahati, Assam, India

- Motto: Vidyayo Sadhayeta
- Motto in English: Achievement through Learning/Knowledge
- Type: Public state university
- Established: 26 January 1948; 78 years ago
- Founders: Gopinath Bordoloi; Krishna Kanta Handique; Birinchi Kumar Barua
- Accreditation: NAAC
- Academic affiliations: UGC; AIU; ACU
- Chancellor: Governor of Assam
- Vice-Chancellor: Nani Gopal Mahanta
- Academic staff: 341 (2018)
- Administrative staff: 1167 (2018)
- Students: 5411 (2018)
- Undergraduates: 1290 (2018)
- Postgraduates: 3721 (2018)
- Doctoral students: 398 (2018)
- Location: Guwahati, Assam, India; 26.1537°N 91.6634°E
- Campus: 650 acres (According to University prospectus 2024-2025); Urban
- Acronym: GU
- Website: gauhati.ac.in//

Gauhati University also known as GU, is a collegiate public state university located in Guwahati, Assam, India. It was established on 26 January 1948 under the provisions of an Act enacted by the Assam Legislative Assembly and is the oldest university in Northeast India. It is accredited with a grade of 'A+' by the National Assessment and Accreditation Council in its 4th cycle of accreditation on 5 July 2024.

Starting with 18 affiliated colleges and 8 Post Graduate Departments in 1948, Gauhati University, today, has 39 Post Graduate Departments, besides IDOL (Institute of Distance and Open Learning), a constituent Law and Engineering College. It has 341 affiliated colleges offering undergraduate and post graduate courses in the faculties of Arts, Science, Commerce, Law, Engineering and Technology. Gauhati University is a member of the Association of Indian Universities and the Association of Commonwealth Universities respectively.

The main gate of Gauhati University in Guwahati

== Accreditation ==
- The university currently holds a National Assessment and Accreditation Council (NAAC) with a CGPA of 3.32, which corresponds to an "A+" grade.
- On 28th April 2025 it secured a coveted place in the Times Higher Education (THE) World University Rankings, entering the 1201–1500 global band, and was also featured in the THE Asia University Rankings at 351–400.
- On 4 September 2025, the university was ranked ninth among state public universities in India according to the National Institutional Ranking Framework (NIRF) 2025, as released by the Ministry of Education.

== History ==
=== Vice-Chancellors ===
- Krishna Kanta Handique 1947 – 1957
- Surya Kumar Bhuyan 1957 – 1960
- H. C. Bhuyan 1960 – 1962
- Phanidhar Dutta 1962 – 1962
- Harold John Taylor 1962 – 1965
- M. N. Goswami 1965 – 1971
- S. C. Rajkhowa 1971 – 1974
- H. K. Barua 1974 – 1979
- J. M. Choudhury 1979 – 1986
- D. P. Barooah 1986 – 1991
- N. K. Choudhury 1991 – 1996
- Hiralal Duarah 1996 – 2001
- G. N. Talukdar 2001 – 2006
- Amarjyoti Choudhury 2006 – 2008
- Okhil Kumar Medhi 2008 – 2013
- Mridul Hazarika 2013 – 2019
- Pratap Jyoti Handique 2019 – 2024
- Nani Gopal Mahanta 2024 – present

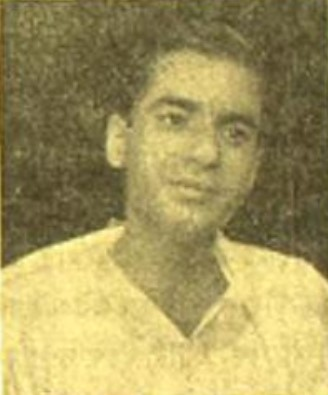
Sri T. Mukhopadhyay, designer of the logo of Gauhati University

The first public demand was made at the annual session of the Assam Association held at Sivasagar in 1917. In 1940, the Government appointed S. K. Bhuyan as Special Officer with the task of collecting relevant information on the selection of site and related matters. The university was established by an act of the State Legislature: the Gauhati University Act 1947 (Assam Act, XVI of 1947) of the government of Assam in 1948. The first court meeting of the university was held on 26 January 1948, which is considered the foundation day, at the old Sudmerson Hall of Cotton College, Guwahati.

Gauhati University started functioning as an affiliating, teaching and residential university in a few temporary buildings in Guwahati, with K.K Handique as the first vice-chancellor, Phanidhar Dutta, Sailandhar Rajkhowa and Sarat Kumar Dutta were selected as the registrar, treasurer and secretary of university classes, respectively. The emblem of the university, selected from among many submitted, was designed by Tripureswar Mukhopadhyay, a textile designer of Ahmedabad. Two Sanskrit words inscribed on it – Vidyaya Sadhayeta (meaning achievement through learning) – indicate the motto of the university. It had 17 affiliated colleges and eight Post Graduate Departments on its establishment. The university which started functioning from the city center was shifted to the present campus in 1955–56.

== Campus ==
Gauhati University Institute of Science and Technology

Entrance to Dr. H.K Baruah Regional Botanical Resource Centre

The university is in Jalukbari in the Guwahati city area. The campus has a hillock on the southern side and the Brahmaputra river flows on the northern side. The campus area has been developed into a small township, now known as 'Gopinath Bardoloi Nagar'. It has about 6000 population including 3700 students residing in the hostels.

Apart from the residential quarters of teachers, officers and employees, there are 22 halls of residence for students. The necessary civic amenities such as health service, water supply, street lighting, internal roads, guest house, post and telegraph office, a branch of the State Bank of India, United Bank Of India, canteens, a market, parks, playgrounds, auditorium, indoor stadium, etc. are on campus.

The university is 10 km from the Lokpriya Gopinath Bordoloi International Airport on National Highway No. 37; 5 km from Kamakhya Railway Station; and 10 km from Guwahati Railway Station as well as from the bus stop near the Cachari (D.C. court) at the heart of Guwahati City. The capital complex of Assam at Dispur is 22 km from the university. The university is easily accessible from the Guwahati city; Guwahati has road, rail and air links from all parts of the country. A large number of bus services from parts of Assam have their station at Adabari bus stand which is 2 km from the campus.

To automate their internal processes, Gauhati University has chosen Kalingasoft's flagship Education ERP solution, Greycells. This implementation has resulted in the complete automation of the university's academic, administrative and financial processes.

=== Library and regional center ===
Krishna Kanta Handique Library

The North Eastern Regional Centre (NERC) of the Indian Council of Historical Research (ICHR) is in the Gauhati University Central Library Extension Building. Along with Bangalore ICHR Regional Centre, this is the only regional centre in GU so far.

The university's Krishna Kanta Handique Library is a designated 'Manuscript Conservation Centre' (MCC) under the National Mission for Manuscripts established in 2003.

The library is the largest in Assam, holding about 850,000 books, magazines, and journals in its collection. It also hosts about 5,000 valuable priceless manuscripts, some more than 300 years old.

== Controversy ==
The Satmile Gate serves as the western entrance to the Gauhati University campus, located in the Jalukbari area of Guwahati, Assam

On 30 June 2024, the Assam Crime Investigation Department (CID) and local police arrested nine individuals, including three government officials, in connection with a mark sheet scam at Gauhati University. The scheme involved manipulating students' marks for a fee, with claims that the rates reached ₹16,000 for individual papers and up to ₹100,000 for all papers in a semester.

Concerns were raised by the Postgraduate Students' Union, prompting Assam Chief Minister Himanta Biswa Sarma to call for an investigation. The CID, assisted by university authorities, conducted raids in multiple locations, leading to the arrests of individuals identified as Azizul Haque, Krishan Krishnamurti, Ismail Hussain, Alomgir Khan, Moinul Haque, Hamezuddin, Abul Baser, Aminul Islam, and Shivtosh Mahato.

The vice-chancellor of Gauhati University, Pratap Jyoti Handique, indicated that the mastermind behind the operation is an employee of the Integrated University Management System (IUMS). The investigation, initially focused on Barpeta, revealed further complexities, leading to ongoing inquiries and the possibility of additional arrests.

On 30 September 2024, Gauhati University temporarily closed two boys' hostels—RCC-1 and RCC-2—following a violent clash between students on 27 September, a day after the postgraduate elections. The incident resulted in injuries to both students and security personnel, with some requiring intensive medical care.

According to a notice issued by the university, the situation escalated due to the involvement of outsiders, leading to serious injuries. As a result, the administration ordered the immediate closure of the two hostels. Alternative accommodation arrangements were made for the residents of RCC-1 and RCC-2 in other hostels within the university campus. The students were given a 48-hour window, ending at 4 pm on 2 October, to relocate, with the university providing transportation facilities to facilitate the move.

The district administration and local law enforcement were called upon to maintain peace and security on the campus. The university, in its statement, emphasized its commitment to ensuring the safety of its students and preventing further incidents. Wardens from other hostels were instructed to assist in the relocation process and ensure that mess facilities were available for the displaced students. The relocation was required to be completed by 2 October, and a final list of relocated boarders was to be submitted by 5 October.

On 15 November 2024, a staff member of Gauhati University was detained on allegations of extorting money from students. The accused, identified as Ankur Barman, was apprehended from the university premises. Barman, who was employed in the office of the Controller of Examinations, allegedly demanded money from students in exchange for providing various services. Police investigations indicated that he had been involved in such activities for an extended period. A police official from the Jalukbari Outpost confirmed the arrest, stating that Barman was detained for extorting funds from students and remains in custody.

On 2 December 2024, Gituraj Lahkar, an employee of Gauhati University, was arrested by Jalukbari Police on charges of accepting a bribe. According to the allegations, Lahkar had accepted Rs 1,800 from a female student for securing her admission. The student filed an FIR at the Jalukbari Police Station, leading to the arrest.

The university has faced ongoing challenges related to delays in examination results and the issuance of certificates. These delays, which have persisted for years, have led to dissatisfaction among students and alumni, impacting their academic and professional pursuits. Many students have reported waiting extended periods for their exam results, with some still awaiting results from semesters completed over a year ago. For instance, a student pursuing a BA LLB program expressed concerns about not receiving results for their third semester, which hindered their academic progress. The issue is not restricted to undergraduate students. Alumni have also raised concerns about delays in obtaining necessary documents such as degree certificates and transcripts. These delays have affected many individuals who require these documents for higher education or employment opportunities. Some former students have reported difficulty in reaching the university's administration, with complaints about the lack of response to emails and calls. The Post Graduate Students' Union (PGSU) has been vocal about these issues, citing systemic problems such as an outdated university portal, a shortage of permanent faculty, and slow processing of results by the Controller of Examinations. These inefficiencies, according to the union, have led to confusion and disruptions in students' academic journeys. The university has acknowledged these challenges. Officials have attributed the delays to factors such as outdated systems, staff shortages, and procedural bottlenecks. Despite assurances of improvements, including plans for digitization and process streamlining, many students and alumni remain skeptical, noting that the situation has not significantly improved over the years. Experts suggest that modernizing the university’s digital infrastructure and improving administrative efficiency could address some of these challenges. Enhancing staff training and ensuring adequate personnel might also help alleviate the operational issues contributing to the delays. While the university's leadership has committed to addressing these concerns, the delays in results and certificates continue to tarnish its reputation. Stakeholders, including current students and alumni, have called for greater transparency and accountability, with many urging the university to take concrete steps to resolve the longstanding issues. The situation highlights the need for systematic changes to ensure timely processing of academic records and certificates, which are critical for students' future opportunities.

On 12 December 2024, Gauhati University received an email threatening that bombs had been planted in at least seven places on its campus. The authorities were immediately alerted and took swift action to ensure the safety of students and staff. Police, along with bomb detection teams, conducted a thorough search of the campus. However, no suspicious devices were found, and the search was concluded without incident.

On 23 February 2025, a violent altercation erupted among students during a cultural evening at Gauhati University, prompting university officials to cancel the event. The clash occurred late at night near the RCC2 Hostel, and journalists attempting to report on the situation faced harassment. As the news of the incident spread, journalists on night duty entered the campus with permission from security personnel. While gathering details, they parked their vehicle near the hostel and were reportedly confronted by a group of intoxicated students. Eyewitnesses indicated that the group, allegedly led by research scholar Neep Jyoti Kalita, misbehaved with the journalists, using abusive language and making threats, while blocking their vehicle to prevent them from leaving. Kalita, who was allegedly intoxicated, is associated with a student organization and is related to former MLA Satyabrata Kalita. Security personnel intervened to mitigate further escalation, but the incident raised concerns about safety on campus and the conduct of senior students during events.

On 26 March 2025, a report highlighted that between 2022 and 2024, Gauhati University, recorded 15 ragging-related complaints. The university was listed among the top eight institutions in India with significant ragging incidents. The report also stated that during this period, a total of 51 fatalities were linked to ragging across various institutions, with 20 deaths occurring in 2024 alone.

The university recently witnessed significant unrest due to student protests and administrative decisions. The controversy emerged following allegations of misconduct against the university's Exam Controller, Dr. Kandarpa Sarma, leading to demands for his removal. On 27 March 2025, students from the Post Graduate Students' Union (PGSU) and the University Law College Students' Union (ULCSU) staged a protest against Dr. Kandarpa Sarma, citing multiple instances of alleged misbehavior. The situation escalated when two student representatives visited Sarma's office to discuss examination-related concerns but claimed to have faced inappropriate behavior instead of resolution. Frustrated by the lack of response from the administration despite previous complaints, students gathered at the Vice Chancellor's office, demanding immediate action. Vice Chancellor Dr. Nani Gopal Mahanta initially assured students that a decision would be made within ten minutes. In response to the growing unrest, the university administration issued an official notice (Ref. VCO/GU/Emer/2025/01-10) announcing the temporary removal of Dr. Kandarpa Sarma from his position pending an investigation. A committee was formed to examine the allegations, including representatives from both PGSU and ULCSU to ensure transparency. Until the committee submits its report, all examination-related matters have been temporarily assigned to the Registrar. Vice Chancellor Mahanta later addressed the issue, expressing regret over his emotional response and reaffirming his commitment to reforms within the examination system. He emphasized that while peaceful protests were recognized as a right, disruptive actions would not be tolerated, although no such alleged actions have been carried out by students. The administration reassured students that normalcy had been restored and that necessary steps were being taken to address their concerns. The investigation committee is expected to submit its findings within a week, after which a final decision on the matter will be taken. Student leaders have indicated that they will continue their protest if adequate action is not taken based on the committee's findings.

On 28 March 2025, the university removed Kandarpa Sarma from his position as Exam Controller following intense student protests over allegations of misconduct and introduced a digital grievance redressal system for examination issues.

In November 2025, the Nagaon district unit of the Asom Jatiyatabadi Yuba Chatra Parishad (AJYCP) submitted a memorandum to the Governor of Assam requesting the removal of Dr. Nani Gopal Mahanta from his position as Vice Chancellor of Gauhati University. The memorandum alleged irregularities and corruption in the use of university funds for infrastructure projects. The district unit, led by president Prabal Sarma and general secretary Hemanta Das, cited media reports highlighting these alleged financial and administrative issues. AJYCP had previously called for Dr. Mahanta's resignation, but no action was taken. The memorandum emphasized the need for an impartial investigation, stating that the university's reputation and the academic prospects of its students could be affected if the allegations were not addressed. The organisation expressed concern that failure to act could further undermine the institution's credibility and called for swift measures to ensure transparency in university administration.

== Enrollment Initiatives ==
A view of the University of Guwahati

On 1 December 2024, the university implemented various initiatives aimed at reducing brain drain and increasing its gross enrolment ratio. One such measure includes introducing second-shift classes after 2 pm to accommodate more students. The university currently receives around 24,000 applications for postgraduate courses but can only admit about 1,800 students. After introducing the afternoon shift, it is expected that the number of seats will increase from 1,800 to 3,600. The university is also planning to introduce new courses and collaborate with experts across different fields to enhance educational opportunities. Brain drain remains a significant challenge in Assam, with many students leaving for higher studies and often not returning due to limited opportunities in the state. To tackle this, the university has recently appointed around 1,000 new college teachers, 70% of whom are from Assam but had studied outside the state. Additionally, The university is working on expanding its infrastructure and educational offerings. The university is in talks with the National Institute of Electronics & Information Technology (NIELIT) to establish a campus at its premises, which would enhance Information Technology education. There are also ongoing discussions with several other institutes for potential academic collaborations. To further improve the quality of education, the university is bringing in experts in various fields. Notably, retired Lt Gen Rana Pratap Kalita, former GoC in C of Eastern Command, has been approached to teach in the Political Science department due to his expertise in geopolitics. These steps are part of University's broader effort to enhance academic offerings, retain local talent, and improve the overall educational environment in Assam. On 7 January 2025, Bharat Bhushan Dev Choudhury, the former Chairman of the Assam Public Service Commission (APSC), has been appointed as a visiting professor in the Political Science Department at Gauhati University. He was selected for his exceptional contributions to public administration. As a visiting professor, Choudhury will engage with faculty, research scholars, and students, offering guidance on public administration and competitive exams. During his tenure as APSC chairman, he was praised for conducting examinations on time, declaring results promptly, and introducing a new focus on analytical questions in the exam structure. Manoj Kumar Goswami, a prominent journalist, has been nominated as a Visiting Professor in the Social Science Department of Gauhati University for the current academic year. Goswami, who holds the position of Chief Editor at Amar Asom and Editor-in-Chief at NKTV, is well-regarded for his contributions to journalism and creative literature. In his new role, he is expected to collaborate with faculty members, support teaching and research activities, and engage with students. The Vice Chancellor of Gauhati University, Prof. Nani Gopal Mahanta, expressed that Goswami's expertise would be a significant addition to the university's academic environment.

In 2025, Gauhati University (GU) and its affiliated colleges experienced a substantial increase in applications for postgraduate (PG) courses. According to university officials, approximately 15,000 candidates submitted over 42,000 applications for admission to various PG programmes. This marks a notable rise from the previous year, when around 28,000 applications were received. The university offers postgraduate courses in 50 subjects across its main campus and affiliated institutions. Despite the growing demand, the total number of available PG seats remains around 4,500. While university authorities had previously proposed introducing a second academic shift in the afternoon to increase intake capacity, the plan had not been implemented as of the 2025 admission cycle. The sharp rise in applications continues to highlight the increasing demand for higher education opportunities in the region.

== Disciplines ==
=== Courses ===
Gauhati University offers a diverse range of postgraduate programs, including 23 courses in Master of Arts (MA), 21 courses in Master of Science (MSc), 5 courses in Master of Technology (MTech), 3 courses in Master of Medical Laboratory Science as well as programs in Master of Commerce (MCom), Master of Library and Information Science (MLISc), Master of Laws (LLM), MSc in Nursing, and Master of Tourism and Management (MTM).

=== Admission Process ===
The Gauhati University Post Graduate Entrance Test (GUPGET) is a mandatory examination for students seeking admission to various postgraduate disciplines. The test consists of 100 multiple-choice questions (MCQs), each carrying 1 mark, leading to a total of 100 marks. The exam includes a negative marking scheme, where 0.25 marks are deducted for each incorrect answer. The examination duration is 2 hours. For admission into the various postgraduate programs, including MA, MSc, MCom, and others, 70% of all seats are reserved for graduates of Gauhati University, while the remaining 30% are open to graduates from other universities. At the end of the exam, invigilators collect both the answer sheets and the question papers from the candidates to ensure the security and confidentiality of the exam content, thereby keeping the questions undisclosed for future.

For students belonging to the General Category (Unreserved category), a minimum score of 50 marks is required to secure a seat in their chosen discipline. The registration fee for the GUPGET is Rs 1000 per subject.

=== Seat Capacity ===
==== Master of Arts (MA) ====
Subject	Intake Capacity
Arabic	60
Anthropology	33
Assamese	88
Bengali	55
Bodo	48
Comparative Indian Literature (MIL&LS)	25
Economics	75
Education	60
English	76
Folklore Studies	25
Geography	40
Hindi	55
History	72
Linguistics	20
English Language Teaching	30
Mass Communication	38
Persian	15
Philosophy	72
Political Science	75
Psychology	33
Sanskrit	80
Sociology	55
Women's Studies	45
Total	1,418

==== Master of Science (MSc) ====
Subject	Intake Capacity
Anthropology	33
Biotechnology	27
Botany	40
Chemistry	50
Computer Science	30
Information Technology	10
Electronics and Communication Technology	20
Environmental Management	15
Environmental Science	15
Geography	40
Geology	30
Herbal Science & Technology	30
Instrumentation & Applied Physics	20
Mathematics	90
Microbiology	10
Microelectronics & Advanced Communication	12
Physics	50
Radiological Physics	10
Statistics	30
Zoology	50
Wildlife Science	15
Total	455

==== Master of Technology (MTech) ====
Subject	Intake Capacity
Material Science & Technology	18
Information Technology	20
Signal Processing & Communication	18
Signal Processing & VLSI	18
Bioprocess Technology	18
Total	92

==== Masters in Medical Laboratory Science ====
Subject	Intake Capacity
Haematology & Blood Banking	5
Clinical Biochemistry	5
Medical Microbiology	5
Total	15

==== Master of Commerce (MCom) ====
Subject	Intake Capacity
Commerce	71

==== Master of Laws (LLM) ====
Subject	Intake Capacity
LLM	50

==== Master of Library and Information Science (MLISc) ====
Subject	Intake Capacity
Library and Information Science	35

==== MSc in Nursing ====
Subject	Intake Capacity
Psychiatric Nursing	20

==== Master of Tourism & Management (MTM) ====
Subject	Intake Capacity
MTM	60

=== Top Colleges ===
Top 5 Affiliated Colleges of Gauhati University in Guwahati
Rank	Name of College	Area (in acres)	Accreditation (Cumulative Points)
1	B. Borooah College	3.83	A++, (3.62)
2	Pandu College	3.95	A, (3.12)
3	Arya Vidyapeeth College	15	A, (3.06)
4	Dispur College	1	A, (3.08)
5	Pragjyotish College	6.55	A, (3.01)

The erstwhile Cotton College of Gauhati University, formerly an affiliated college, was accredited with an 'A++' grade and a cumulative grade point average (CGPA) of 3.76 on a four-point scale—the highest at the time. No other college under GU has achieved this to date. The accreditation was awarded by the National Assessment and Accreditation Council (NAAC) on 5 November 2016.

=== Off-Campus Courses ===
==== Admission Procedure for PG Courses in Affiliated Colleges under Gauhati University ====
To gain admission into the Post Graduate (PG) courses offered by affiliated colleges under Gauhati University, students are required to take the Gauhati University Post Graduate Entrance Test (GUPGET) for the relevant year. This entrance examination is mandatory for students aspiring to enroll in PG programs at these affiliated colleges. The PG courses available in these institutions are categorized as self-financing, allowing colleges to establish their own fee structures. As a result, tuition fees for these programs are typically double those of Gauhati University's own PG courses. Additionally, the fees paid at the time of admission for the first semester are non-refundable. Prospective students are advised to consider this policy carefully before finalizing their admission. A total of 46 affiliated colleges offer more than 2,500 seats across various disciplines. These colleges provide programs in 11 subjects within the Humanities, 8 subjects in the Science stream, as well as courses in Commerce. The numbers in parentheses indicate the seat availability for each subject at the respective college or institute.

Gauhati University Postgraduate Courses in Affiliated colleges
College Name	Location	Subjects Available with Seat Intake
Anandaram Dhekial Phookan College	Nagaon	Assamese (40), Herbal Science & Technology (30), History (30)
Arya Vidyapeeth College	Guwahati	Mathematics (50), Chemistry (20)
Kaliabor College	Kuwaritol	Commerce (40), Education (25)
Jawaharlal Nehru College, Boko	Boko	Assamese (30), Mathematics (20)
K.C. Das Commerce College	Guwahati	Commerce (60)
Barnagar College	Sorbhog	Assamese (20), History (20), Political Science (20)
Khagarijan College	Nagaon	Assamese (25)
B. Borooah College	Guwahati	Botany (12), Chemistry (14), Geography (10), Zoology (12)
Lokopriya Gopinath Bordoloi Regional Institute of Mental Health	Tezpur	Psychiatric Nursing (12), Haematology & Blood Banking (5), Medical Microbiology (5), Clinical Biochemistry (5)
B.H. College	Howly	Assamese (20), Education (20), Commerce (70)
Mangaldai College	Mangaldai	Assamese (30)
Bagadhar Brahma Kishan College	Barpeta	Assamese (20)
MC College	Barpeta	Assamese (20), Botany (10)
Bikali College	Dhupdhara	Assamese (30), Geography (10)
Morigaon College	Morigaon	Geography (10), Zoology (10)
Biswanath College	Biswanath Chariali	Assamese (20)
Nalbari College	Nalbari	Assamese (50), English (20)
BMBB Commerce College	Guwahati	Commerce (50)
Nalbari Commerce College	Nalbari	Commerce (50)
Bholanath College	Dhubri	Assamese (25)
Nagaon GNDG Commerce College	Nagaon	Commerce (60)
Bongaigaon College	Bongaigaon	English (50), Hindi (20)
Nowgong Girls' College	Nagaon	Assamese (40), Geography (20)
BRM Government Law College	Guwahati	Law (20)
NEF College	Guwahati	Commerce (50), Sociology (60)
Chaygaon College	Chaygaon	Assamese (30)
NEF Law College	Guwahati	Law (50)
Darrang College	Tezpur	Assamese (30), Botany (20), Geography (15), Zoology (10)
NERIM Commerce College	Guwahati	Commerce (120)
Dimoria College	Khetri	Assamese (40), Economics (30), Environmental Management (20)
Pandu College	Guwahati	Assamese (30), Bengali (20), Economics (20), Education (30), Geography (20), History (25), Political Science (20), Zoology (22)
Dakshin Kamrup College	Mirza	Assamese (40), Zoology (10)
Paschim Guwahati Mahavidyalaya	Dharapur	Assamese (30), Political Science (20)
Dhubri Law College	Dhuburi	Law (20)
Pragjyotish College	Guwahati	Assamese (50), Education (20), Economics (20), Geography (15), Geology (10), Tourism Management (30), Zoology (10)
Dispur Law College	Dispur	Law (20)
Rangapara College	Rangapara	Hindi (20)
Dakshin Kamrup Girls' College	Mirza	Assamese (25)
Rangia College	Rangia	Assamese (20), Arabic (25), Bodo (20), Botany (10), Education (15), English (10), Sanskrit (15)
Dr Anita Baruah Sarmah College of Education	Guwahati	Education (60)
Rupahi College	Rupahi	Arabic (20)
Gauhati Commerce College	Guwahati	Commerce (60), Business Administration (60)
Sipajhar College	Sipajhar	Assamese (20)
Handique Girls College	Guwahati	Assamese (20), Botany (15), Chemistry (15), Zoology (15), Economics (20), English (30), Philosophy (20), Political Science (30), PGDCA (20)
Sonapur College	Sonapur	Assamese (20), Geography (10), English (30)
Icon Commerce College	Guwahati	Commerce (40)
Suren Das College	Hajo	Political Science (20)
Jagiroad College	Jagiroad	Tourism Management (30)
Tezpur Law College	Tezpur	Law (30)
JB Law College	Guwahati	Law (50)
Tihu College	Tihu	Education (20), History (20)

== Facilities ==
=== Food Courts and Canteens ===
The campus offers various food options, including the GU Arts Canteen located near the BKB Auditorium, the GU Food Court situated along the path to the Department of Education, and the Faculty House Canteen near the Department of Business Administration. Additionally, the GU Market has a variety of eateries catering to diverse tastes. The GU Market is a shopping area within the campus that meets a range of daily needs. It includes stores that provide food and restaurant options, groceries, a pharmacy, stationery, photocopy and printing services, and tailoring.

=== University Market ===
The campus has a variety of dining options available. Some of these include the GU Arts Canteen, located near the BKB Auditorium; the GU Food Court, found along the route to the Department of Education; and the Faculty House Canteen, near the Department of Business Administration. There are also additional eateries in the GU Market area. The GU Market is a well-developed shopping hub on campus that caters to a range of daily needs. It offers access to food and dining options, grocery stores, a pharmacy, stationery supplies, photocopying and printing services, and tailoring facilities.

== Library ==
=== Krishna Kanta Handiqui Library ===
The Krishna Kanta Handiqui Library at Gauhati University was founded to support the academic needs of students, faculty, and researchers. Named after the university's first Vice-Chancellor, Professor Krishna Kanta Handiqui, a renowned Sanskrit scholar and Orientalist, the library not only aids classroom instruction but also supports a variety of research initiatives. The library aims to preserve and disseminate knowledge, contributing to development and progress within Assam and across India. By preserving cultural, scientific, and technological knowledge accumulated over centuries, the library supports the continuity and advancement of civilization. The university library began operating in 1948 at Chandmari (now known as the old University Colony). It later moved to Room No. 1 of the Arts building before relocating to its current building in 1962. In 1982, it was renamed Krishna Kanta Handiqui Library in honor of the late Vice-Chancellor. Professor Handiqui's personal collection, donated to the university, includes 7,593 volumes, with books in eleven languages, including English, French, German, Greek, Italian, Latin, Pali, Prakrit, Russian, Sanskrit, and Spanish.

== Organisation and administration ==
=== Governance ===
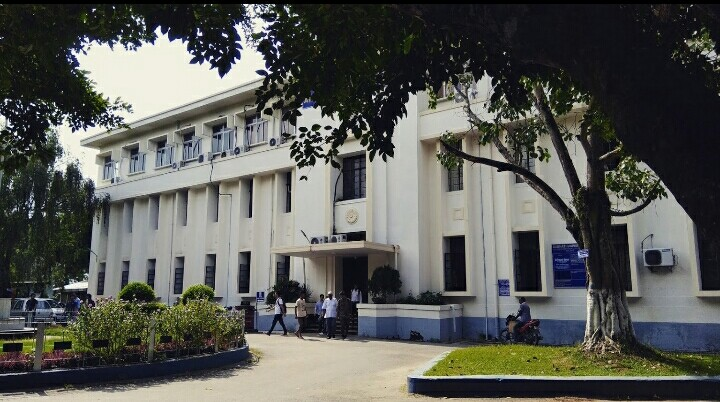
Administrative Building

The G.U. Court, the Executive Council and the Academic Council are the authorities of the university.

In August 2024, Professor Nani Gopal Mahanta was appointed as the Vice-Chancellor of the university.

=== Faculties ===
New Academic Building

Arts Building

==== Academic faculties ====
The institution is divided into following academic units:

- Faculty of Arts
  - Arabic
  - Assamese
  - Bengali
  - Bodo
  - Communication and Journalism
  - Disabilities Studies
  - Economics
  - Education
  - English
  - English Language Teaching
  - Folklore
  - Foreign Languages
  - Hindi
  - History
  - Geography
  - Library and Information Science
  - Linguistics
  - Modern Indian Languages (Odia, Tamil, Nepali)
  - Persian
  - Philosophy
  - Political Science
  - Philosophy
  - Sanskrit
  - Sociology
  - Women’s Studies
- Faculty of Sciences
  - Anthropology
  - Botany
  - Chemistry
  - Environmental Science
  - Geography
  - Geological Sciences
  - Mathematics
  - Physics
  - Statistics
  - Zoology
- Faculty of Technology
  - Biological Science
  - Biotechnology
  - Biotechnology and Bioengineering
  - Chemical Science
  - Computer Science
  - Electronics and Communication Engineering
  - Electronics and Communication Technology
  - Information Technology
  - Instrumentation and USIC
  - Mathematical Science
  - Physical Science
- Faculty of Commerce
  - Commerce
- Faculty of Management
  - Business Administration
- Faculty of Law
  - Law

=== Colleges ===
Its jurisdiction extends over 15 districts - Bajali district, Barpeta, Biswanath, Bongaigaon, Darrang, Dhubri, Goalpara, Hojai, Kamrup Metropolitan, Kamrup district, Morigaon, Nagaon, Nalbari, Sonitpur, South Salmara district.

== Students Union ==
=== Post Graduate Students' Union ===
The Post Graduate Students' Union is the apex student representative body of Gauhati University. The first body of PGSU was formed in the year 1949. The first General Secretary was Biren Goswami. Gauhati University being the epicenter of student politics, the PGSU gets high recognition in the state. There are many General Secretaries as well as other office bearers of PGSU who have been involved in the active politics. The present General Secretary of PGSU is Parshwa Patgiri.

== Academics ==
=== Rankings ===
University rankings

General – international
- QS (Asia) (2023): 601–650
- Times (World) (2024): 1000-1200

General – India
- NIRF (Overall) (2024): 57
- NIRF (Universities) (2024): 40

Internationally, the QS World University Rankings ranked Gauhati University in the 601–650 band in Asia in 2023.

In India, the National Institutional Ranking Framework (NIRF) ranked Gauhati University 57 overall and 40 among universities in 2024.

== Notable people ==
=== Notable alumni ===
- Bhaktisvarupa Damodar Swami, Spiritual leader
- Lalduhoma, 5th Chief Minister of Mizoram
- Pranavjyoti Deka, Indian writer and geologist
- Yeshe Dorjee Thongchi, writer
- Rajen Gohain, politician
- Bharat Narah, politician
- Darwin Diengdoh Pugh, 2nd Chief Minister of Meghalaya
- Moirangthem Kirti Singh, Indian writer, Padma Shri (1992)
- Syed Abdul Malik, Indian writer, Padma Shri (1984), Padma Bhushan (1992)
- Lal Thanhawla, 3rd and the longest serving Chief Minister of Mizoram
- Bhabesh Kalita, politician
- Pradyut Bordoloi, politician
- Ramen Deka, Governor of Chhattisgarh
- Bhubon Pegu, politician
- Ganesh Kutum, former politician
- Ambika Charan Choudhury, litterateur
- Nilamani Sen Deka, politician
- Ajanta Neog, Finance minister of Assam
- Ujjal Bhuyan, Judge at Supreme Court of India
- Pranab Kumar Gogoi, politician
- Jitendra Nath Goswami, Indian scientist, chief scientist of Chandrayaan-1, Shanti Swarup Bhatnagar Laureate (1994), Padma Shri (2017)
- Bhabananda Deka, economist
- Purnima Devi Barman, Wildlife Biologist, Nari Shakti Puraskar (2017), Whitley Awards (2017)
- Kashmiri Saikia Baruah, Actress and Singer.
- Mamoni Raisom Goswami, novelist, Sahitya Akademi Award (1983), Jnanpith Award (2001), Principal Prince Claus Laureate (2008)
- Dipak C. Jain, professor, European president at CEIBS
- Hitendra Nath Goswami, former Speaker of Assam Legislative Assembly
- Nagen Saikia, Indian writer, Sahitya Akademi Award (1997)
- Bijoya Chakravarty, politician, former Union Minister of State, Water Resources
- Elangbam Nilakanta Singh, poet, Sahitya Akademi Award (1987), Padma Shri (2000)
- Ritu Lalit, Indian writer
- Sarbananda Sonowal, politician, current union minister, former chief minister of Assam
- Prafulla Kumar Mahanta, former chief minister of Assam
- Mukundakam Sharma, lawyer, former judge in the Supreme Court of India, former Chief Justice of Delhi High Court
- Temsula Ao, novelist, Padma Shri (2007), Sahitya Akademi Award (2013)
- Atul Bora, politician
- Himanta Biswa Sarma, current Chief Minister of Assam
- Riniki Bhuyan Sharma, lawyer and entrepreneur.
- Ramkrishna Ghosh, politician
- Ardhendu Kumar Dey, politician
- Dhruba Hazarika, novelist
- Siddhartha Bhattacharya, politician
- Nirmal Prabha Bordoloi, novelist, Sahitya Akademi Award (1983)
- Arupa Kalita Patangia, novelist, Sahitya Akademi Award (2014)
- Bhupendra Nath Goswami, Indian scientist, Shanti Swarup Bhatnagar Laureate (1995)
- Mahim Bora, Indian writer, Sahitya Akademi Award (2001), Padma Shri (2011)
- Tarun Gogoi, former Chief Minister of Assam and the longest serving Chief minister of Assam, Padma Bhushan (2021)
- Amrita Gogoi, Indian actress.
- Harishankar Brahma, 19th Chief Election Commissioner of India
- Birendra Nath Datta, Indian researcher, Padma Shri (2009)
- Debapratim Purkayastha, Indian educator
- Kishore Jadav, writer

=== Notable faculty ===
- Debo Prasad Barooah, former vice-chancellor
- Okhil Kumar Medhi, former vice-chancellor
- Surya Kumar Bhuyan, former vice-chancellor
- Amarjyoti Choudhury, former lecturer
- Krishna Kanta Handique, founder vice-chancellor of Gauhati University, Padma shri (1955), Padma Bhushan (1967)
- Bhupen Hazarika, former lecturer
- Banikanta Kakati, former dean of Faculty of Arts and head of the Assamese Department.
- Jyotiprasad Medhi, former head and professor of statistics department.
- Maheswar Neog, former professor
- N. U. Prabhu, former lecturer
- Bhabendra Nath Saikia, former lecturer
- Hiren Gohain, former professor

== See also ==
- List of colleges affiliated to Gauhati University
