= European Laboratory for Non-Linear Spectroscopy =

European Laboratory for Non-linear Spectroscopy Laboratorio Europeo per la Spettroscopia Non-lineare
- Motto: Scientific excellence is our guiding light
- Established: February 9, 1991
- Research type: Laser facility
- Budget: €10,000,000
- Director: Giovanni Modugno
- Staff: 100+
- Location: Sesto Fiorentino, Florence, Italy
- Operating agency: University of Florence
- Website: lens.unifi.it

The European Laboratory for Non-linear Spectroscopy (LENS) is an interdisciplinary research center established by the Italian Ministry of Education in 1991 within the University of Florence thanks to the initiative of Prof. Salvatore Califano.

== Mission ==
LENS mission is focused on three main goals: facilitating the scientific collaboration between European researchers in the field of linear and non-linear spectroscopy; providing the most advanced equipment available, assistance and advice to qualified researchers; conceive, plan and carry out research projects in collaboration with other universities and institutions both nationally and internationally.

== Structure ==
LENS has a strong international and interdisciplinary structure. The Directive Council is composed of experts in different fields of research covered by LENS. Such Council oversees all scientific, administrative and financial activities: the University of Florence, the Italian National Institute of Optics under the CNR, the Max Planck Institute of Quantum Optics, the Kaiserslautern University of Technology and the Pierre and Marie Curie University are all represented on the board.

The current LENS director, appointed by the Rector of the University of Florence on the proposal of the Directive Council, is Giovanni Modugno.

The director shall be assisted by a European Committee composed of the Rectors and Presidents of universities and affiliated research organizations or their representatives.

== Head office ==
After many years on the historic hill of Arcetri, since 2001 LENS is located within the Science and Technology Campus in Sesto Fiorentino.

== Scientific research ==
LENS foundation was started by a group of researchers involved in atomic and molecular laser spectroscopy, but during three decades its research activity has grown and diversified to also cover cold atoms physics (Bose–Einstein condensate and Fermi gas), physics of complex and disordered systems, photochemistry, biochemistry and biophysics, quantum biology, materials science, photonics, biophotonics, condensed matter physics, and the analysis, preservation and restoration of artistic heritage. All of these fields share the same fundamental methodology: the use of laser light to investigate matter.

LENS research groups are involved in three main research lines: quantum science and technology, photonic materials and biophotonics.

== European Laserlab consortium ==
As a laser facility, LENS is part of the Laserlab-Europe consortium since its foundation, providing access to its labs within the Transnational Access To Research Infrastructures Programme of the European Commission. Main research interests are represented by five Joint Research Activities, two of which involve LENS: ALADIN and OPTBIO.

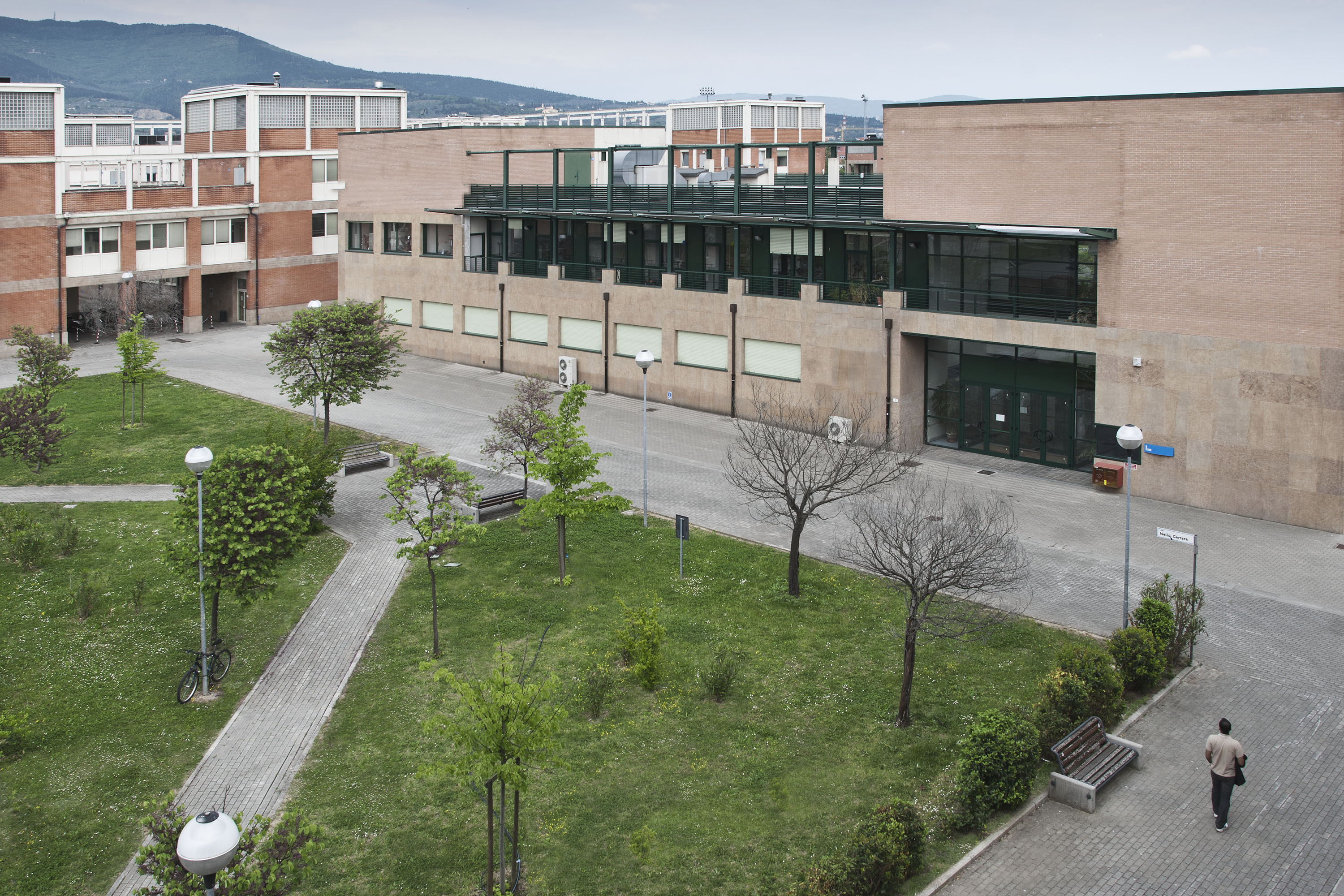
LENS main building at Polo Scientifico e Tecnologico of the University of Florence in Sesto Fiorentino

== Training ==
LENS provides a PhD school, also supported by the University of Florence and others European universities, and a Postdoctoral fellowship programme. Both initiatives are partially supported by the EU Marie Curie Actions funded by the European Commission in various scientific disciplines and the European Erasmus Mundus programme.

== Awards ==
In 2017, the Italian National Agency for the Evaluation of the University and Research Systems (ANVUR), in its triennial report about national research (referred to the 2011–2014 period), has ranked LENS at the top of Italian small scientific centers for physics and chemistry.
