= Udalguri College =

College in Assam, India

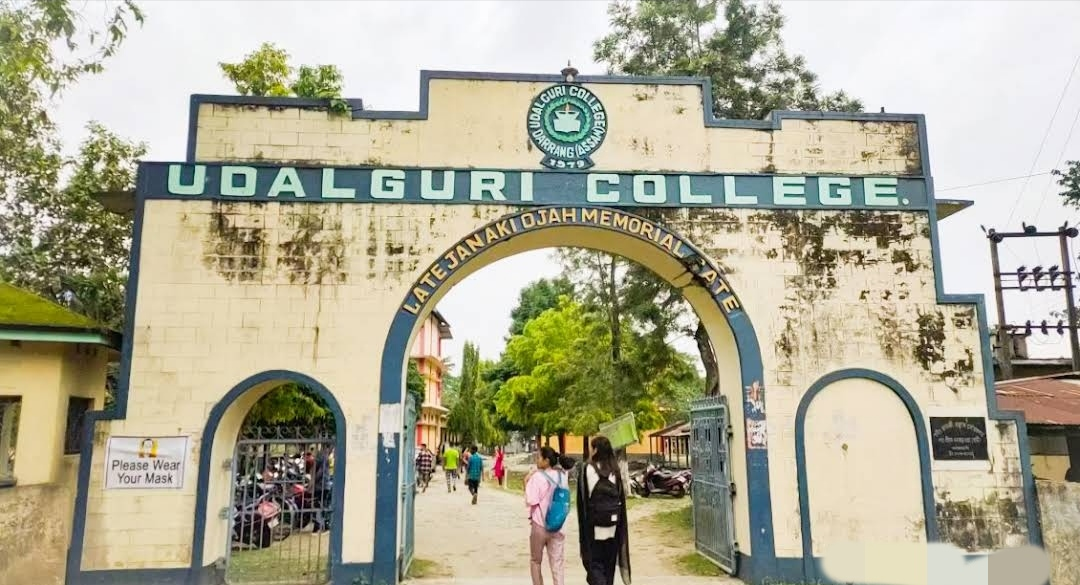
- Udalguri College gate
- Type: Public
- Established: 1979
- Accreditation: NAAC
- Affiliations: Bodoland University
- Principal: Dr Luke Daimari
- Location: Udalguri, Assam, India
- Campus: Rural Campus
- Language: English
- Website: udalguricollegeedu.in admission.udalguricollegeedu.in

Udalguri College, established on 20 August 1978, is a general degree college in Udalguri, Assam, India. This college is affiliated with the Bodoland University. This college offers different courses in arts and science.

It also has distance learning centers of IGNOU and IDOL.

History:

Udalguri College came into existence on 20 August 1979, as a result of the ceaseless and untiring efforts of the preparatory committee under the leadership of the founder Principal Late Sailendra Nath Brahma. The primary aim was to provide an opportunity to the economically weak and underprivileged people of this region. The college has been rendering valuable service to the cause of imparting higher education in Udalguri, its outskirts and nearby districts too from the last 41 years. During its journey, it has created opportunities for the underprivileged and the youths from the weaker sections of society, giving them a sense of purpose and direction in the pursuit of their dreams. Starting as an Arts college in 1979, the college has now grown into a full-fledged two-stream college with Arts and Science, and Honours courses in almost all the subjects offered.

Accreditation:

NAAC inspected the college in 2004 for the first Cycle of Accreditation, had graded the college with C++ (68.25%) and the second cycle of accreditation was carried out in 2016 and awarded ‘B’ grade (CGPA2.05).

Courses:

Courses in BA and MA are available across Humanities and Science streams.

Bachelor of Arts (BA) is offered in the following subjects: Assamese, Bodo, Economics, Education, English, History, Nepali, Philosophy, Political Science.

Bachelor of Science (BSc) is offered in the following subjects: Botany, Chemistry, Mathematics, Physics, zoology

Master of Arts (MA) in Bodo is also offered.

Alumni:

Udalguri college has an alumni strength of 25,000 plus.

Different Cells:

Academic Cell
