= Goalpara College =

Coordinates: 26.1708°N 90.6266°E

- Type: Public Institution
- Established: 1955 (71 years ago)
- Principal: Dr. Subhash Barman
- Administrative staff: 110
- Location: Goalpara, Assam, India
- Campus: Urban, central Goalpara Town
- Website: www.goalparacollege.ac.in
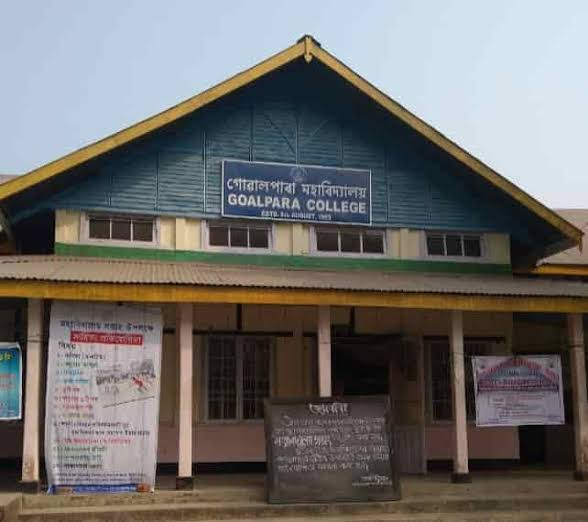

Goalpara College is an institution of higher learning in western Assam, India. It was established in 1955 with the help and cooperation from local people. At present, it has 16 departments with a total staff strength of 110. It is affiliated to Gauhati University, Guwahati.

== History ==
Before 1955, the undivided Goalpara district had only one degree college at Dhubri, the then district headquarters situated on the north bank of the Brahmaputra. Owing to poverty, poor communication system and other socio-economic problems, many aspirant youths of the remote places of the south bank of the Brahmaputra were not able to get admitted to that college. An urgent need for a college on the south bank of the Brahmaputra was felt.

On 8 August 1955, Goalpara College came into existence with 6 lecturers and 22 students under the principalship of Wazuddin Ahmed, M.Sc, B.L. With the support and guidance of Khagendra Nath, the M.L.A. of Goalpara and social activist, and local support, ultimately the undergraduate college was established in Goalpara with a permanent building later being made in 1959.

It was brought under the deficit grant-in-aid system in 1962. When the college began to receive the deficit grants-in-aid from the government and got a little over the financial constraints, the same group of enthusiastic people undertook another bold venture of opening a science faculty. As a result, the science faculty was introduced in 1966 and was brought under the deficit grant-in-aid system in 1974.

== Departments ==
The college offers three-year degree courses in the Science and Arts faculties leading to Bachelor of Science (BSc) and Bachelor of Arts (BA). Besides these, the college provides two-year Higher Secondary courses (certificate) in both faculties. The college has the provision for major (honours) course of study in the following:

- Subjects in the Arts faculty:
  - Assamese
  - English
  - Economics
  - Education
  - Geography
  - History
  - Mathematics
  - Philosophy
  - Political Science
  - Statistics
  - Sociology.

.

- Subjects in the Science faculty:
  - Botany
  - Chemistry,
  - Economics,
  - Geography,
  - Mathematics,
  - Physics,
  - Statistics,
  - Zoology and
  - Environmental Science.

== Campus ==
The college is in the heart of Goalpara on a sprawling campus of around 10 acres (40,000 m^{2}) of land.

== Library ==
The library of the college is well equipped with about 27,000 books, comprising textbooks, reference books, encyclopedias and several valuable collections covering wide range of subjects. The library regularly subscribes to 22 national/international journals/periodicals in Assamese, Hindi and English languages and seven national and local dailies. It is well maintained through computer based software (SOUL). Reprographic facility is available for the library users and Internet facility is being installed.

A book bank in the library facilitates the economically weaker sections of the students. The UN/UNESCO Reading Library Corner provides access to UN publications.

== Achievements ==
The NAAC accredited the college with a A+ grade in 2023. The college caters the need of higher education of about 2000 students in its arts and science streams. In 2008, the college was selected for grants under FIST (Faculty Improvement of Science and Technology) scheme of the DST (Department of Science and Technology, Government of India).

The college has received grants from DBT (Department of Bio-technology, Government of India) for modernising life science education components. Along with the regular courses under Gauhati University and Assam Higher Secondary Education Council, the College provides distance and open education under IGNOU (Indira Gandhi National Open University), KKHSOU (Krishna Kanta Handique State Open University) and IDOL (Institute of Distance and Open Learning, GU).

The college regularly organises national seminars and conferences.

== Hostels ==
The college has two separate hostels for boys and girls with capacity of 50 seats each, located inside the college premise.
