= Morigaon College =

College in Assam, India

- Type: Public
- Established: 1964
- Affiliations: Gauhati University
- Principal: Dr. Lila Kanta Barthakur
- Location: Morigaon, Assam, India
- Website: https://morigaoncollege.ac.in

Morigaon College, established in 1964, is one of the oldest undergraduate, coeducational college situated in Morigaon, Assam. This college is affiliated with the Gauhati University.

== Accreditation ==
The college has been awarded an "A" grade by the National Assessment and Accreditation Council (NAAC) with a Cumulative Grade Point Average (CGPA) of 3.25. This score is the highest in its category, reflecting the college's focus on maintaining academic standards and quality education.

== Departments ==
=== Science ===
- Physics
- Mathematics
- Chemistry
- Anthropology
- Botany
- Zoology

=== Arts and Commerce ===
- Assamese
- English
- Disaster Management
- History
- Education
- Economics
- Philosophy
- Political Science
- Hindi
- Geography
- Commerce
