= Johnstone Higher Secondary School, Imphal =

Johnstone Higher Secondary School
- Johnstone's School

Location
- Bir Tikendrajit Road; Imphal, Manipur, 795001; India
- Coordinates: 24.806°N 93.938°E

Information
- School type: Government
- Established: 1885
- Founder: Sir James Johnstone (KCSI)
- Status: Active
- Principal: Saya Devi
- Faculty: Local
- Gender: male
- Classes: +2 Levels
- Language: English
- Campus: Urban
- Affiliation: Council of Higher Secondary Education, Manipiur

Johnstone Higher Secondary School is a premier higher secondary school in Manipur located at the heart of Imphal city in Bir Tikendrajit Road. The school is an institution recognised by Council of Higher Secondary Education, Manipur.

== History ==
The school was established by Sir James Johnstone, the political agent of Manipur from 1877 to 1886 during the British colonial rule in India. Sir James Johnstone was born on 9 February 1841. So, every year on 9 February, Sir Johnstone's birthday is celebrated with a simple function by the teachers and students.

== Location ==
Johnstone Higher Secondary School is located at the heart of Imphal city adjacent to the Bir Tikendrajit Park (B.T. Park), 0 km from Kangla gate (Chaarali Gate). The Ima Keithel (Famous Women's Market) is also situated less than a kilometer from the school. Due to the proximity of the location of this institution, major important events took place at this location. The history of this school dates back as far back as to the history of the British regime in Manipur. Prominent world scholars such as Fritz Stall visited this school as part of their research work and collect valuable information from the archives of the institution.

== Departments ==
The school has Arts, Sciences, Commerce and vocational subjects. It was one of the first to launch a pre-university commerce education in the state in 1983.

== Alumni ==
The school has produced a large number of academics, university professors, scientists, civil servants, politicians, and other renowned persons in Manipur as well as in India and different parts of the world.
