= International Tourism Management =

Degree course

International Tourism Management is a degree course, whose main focuses with regard to contents consist of business basics with a tourism covering, cross cultural and social competence as well as leadership- and professional competence.

== International management ==
International Management deals with the maintenance and development of a multinational operation across national borders, whose manager has the knowledge and the skills to manage and handle cross-cultural processes, stakeholders and environments in a right way.

== Tourism management ==
see Tourism management

Programs Offered

- Air Grace Aviation Academy (India)
- The Hong Kong Polytechnic University
- Bremen University of Applied Sciences
- Karlshochschule International University
- Kasetsart University
- Westcoast University of Applied Sciences
- University of Applied Sciences Saarland
- International University of Applied Sciences Bad Honnef - Bonn
- University of the West Indies St. Augustine Campus (UWI)
- deggendorf institute of technology pfarrkirchen (Germany)
- International Air Transport Association (Canada)

== Comparison of the course characteristics of all universities ==
	Bremen University of Applied Sciences	Karlshochschule Int. University	Westcoast University of Applied Sciences	University of Applied Sciences Saarland	Int. University of Applied Sciences Bad Honnef-Bonn
Entry Requirements	Overall average grade, A-levels or advanced technical college entrance qualification, internship or apprenticeship, advanced English level, covering letter	A-levels or advanced technical college entrance qualification, covering letter, entrance examination	A-levels or advanced technical college entrance qualification, master's degree, performance test, internship	overall average grade, A-levels or advanced technical college entrance qualification, internship, language test a) English+French or b) English+Spanish	A-levels or advanced technical college entrance qualification, entrance examination, language test English
Degree	B.A.	B.A.	B.A.	B.A.	B.A. + Bachelor abroad
Regular period of study	7	6	6	6	6
Foreign languages	Spanish, French, Indonesian, Portuguese, Chinese	Arabic, Chinese, Spanish, French, Russian	Business-English, Spanish	English, French, Spanish	n/a
Anglophone tutorials	yes	yes	yes	yes	yes
Semester abroad	obligatory study abroad plus obligatory internship abroad	optionally study abroad	optionally study abroad or internship	obligatory internship abroad	2 obligatory studies abroad plus obligatory internship abroad
Tooth-work of theorie and practice	obligatory internship abroad (20 weeks), Learner's Company Cooperation between students and tourism companies on more than 10 real tourism projects each semester. Three of the projects offered in the Summer semester 2009 were: TUI-Welcome of the future (TUI Service); Performance on the trade show ITB Berlin (Hochschule Bremen); Development of a sustainable tourism guideline (Beluga School for Life); International Days Informationevent organized by students of the 7th semester who returned from their stay abroad. Serves as informationplatform for interested persons to prepare a stay abroad.	obligatory internship (12–24 weeks) cooperation in tourism projects	optionally internship (1 semester), case study-seminars, project-study in cooperation with external partners	obligatory internship abroad (12 weeks)	obligatory internship abroad (1 semester)
