= Assam Higher Secondary Education Council =

Regulator of higher education in Assam, India

- Logo
- Abbreviation: AHSEC
- Merged into: Assam State School Education Board
- Formation: June 1, 1984; 41 years ago
- Dissolved: September 13, 2024; 19 months ago
- Type: State Education Regulatory Board
- Headquarters: Guwahati, India
- Location: Bamunimaidam, Guwahati - 781 021.
- Official language: Bodo, Assamese and English
- Chairman: Rukma Gohain Baruah, Assam Human Resource Development Service
- Secretary: Sri Pulak Patgiri, Assam Civil Service
- Parent organisation: Ministry of Education (Assam), Government of Assam
- Website: https://ahsec.assam.gov.in/

The Assam Higher Secondary Education Council (AHSEC) was a state education regulatory board under the jurisdiction of Ministry of Education, Government of Assam that is responsible to regulate, supervise and develop the system of Higher Secondary Education in the State of Assam.

== Languages ==
AHSEC offers education in the following languages:

Modern Indian Languages
Assamese, Bengali, Bodo, Garo, Hmar, Hindi, Khasi, Meitei (Manipuri), Mizo, Nepali & Urdu.
Advance Languages
Advance Assamese, Advance Bengali, Advance Bodo, Advance Hindi & Advance Manipuri.

== History ==
The AHSEC was established on 1 June 1984 by the Government of Assam. The council was formed with the objective of regulating and supervising the higher secondary education system in the state. The council also plays a role in developing the curriculum and syllabus for the higher secondary examination.

Over the years, AHSEC has played a pioneering role in the field of education in Assam. The council has introduced a number of innovative measures to improve the quality of education in the state. Some of the key initiatives of AHSEC include:

- Introducing a new curriculum that is aligned with the national curriculum framework
- Introducing online learning for students
- Conducting regular assessments of students to track their progress
- Providing financial assistance to students from economically weaker sections

As a result of these initiatives, AHSEC has been able to achieve a number of milestones. The pass percentage in the higher secondary examination has increased significantly, the gender gap in education has been reduced, and the quality of education in the higher secondary schools and colleges has improved.

== Functions ==
The AHSEC is responsible for the following functions:

- Regulating and supervising the higher secondary education system in Assam
- Developing the curriculum and syllabus for the higher secondary examination
- Conducting the higher secondary examination
- Publishing the results of the higher secondary examination
- Providing affiliation to schools and colleges for the higher secondary course
- Granting recognition to schools and colleges for the higher secondary course
- Promoting research and development in the field of higher secondary education

== Achievements ==
The AHSEC has achieved a number of milestones in the past few years. Some of the notable achievements of the council include:

- Increasing the pass percentage in the higher secondary examination
- Reducing the gender gap in the higher secondary examination
- Improving the quality of education in the higher secondary schools and colleges
- Promoting research and development in the field of higher secondary education.

== Future Plans ==
- Introducing new subjects in the higher secondary curriculum. AHSEC is planning to introduce new subjects in the higher secondary curriculum, such as artificial intelligence, data science, and robotics.
- Introducing online learning for students. AHSEC is planning to introduce online learning for students. This will help students who cannot attend regular classes due to distance or other constraints.
- Improving the infrastructure of schools and colleges. AHSEC is planning to improve the infrastructure of schools and colleges. This will include providing better classrooms, laboratories, and libraries.
- Providing financial assistance to students from economically weaker sections. AHSEC is planning to increase the amount of financial assistance that is provided to students from economically weaker sections.

== Overview ==
The Assam Higher Secondary Education Council was established by the Assam government on 1 June 1984 to regulate, supervise and develop the system of higher secondary education in the State of Assam. AHSEC officially announce the results in June.
