= Barbary Coast (disambiguation) =

Barbary Coast is the term used by Europeans from the 16th until the 19th century to refer to the coastal regions of what is now Morocco, Algeria, Tunisia, and Libya.

Barbary Coast may also refer to:

== Places ==
- Barbary Coast, San Francisco, an entertainment district
- Barbary Coast Trail, a walking tour in San Francisco, California
- Barbary Coast Lounge, a former nightclub in Portland, Oregon
- Lincoln Park, Newark, also called the Barbary Coast
- The Cromwell Las Vegas, formerly known as the Barbary Coast Hotel and Casino

== Media ==
- Barbary Coast (film), a 1935 movie directed by Howard Hawks
- Barbary Coast (TV series), a 1975 made-for-TV movie pilot and subsequent television series starring William Shatner
- Barbary Coast (musical), a 1978 musical
- "Barbary Coast", an instrumental composition by Jaco Pastorius on the 1976 album Black Market
- "Barbary Coast (Later)", a song composed by Conor Oberst on the 2016 album Ruminations
- Barbary Coast, part two of the graphic novel The Big Ride as part of The Boys 2011 comic book series
  - "Barbary Coast" (The Boys), the 2022 television episode adaptation of this arc

== See also ==
- Battle of the Barbary Coast, a 1592 naval engagement between English and Spanish forces
- "Coast of High Barbaree", a traditional song which was popular among British and American sailors
- Barbary pirates
- Berberia (genus), a genus of butterflies from North Africa
- Barbary (disambiguation)
- Barbary Coast Bunny, a 1956 Bugs Bunny cartoon short
- Barbary Coast Gent, a 1944 American film
- BarBri
- Flame of Barbary Coast, a 1945 American Western film
- The Last Night of the Barbary Coast, a 1913 American film
- Law of the Barbary Coast, a 1949 American historical crime film
- "A Night on the Barbary Coast", a short story by Kage Baker
- Pirates of the Barbary Coast, the fourth installment of the constructible strategy game Pirates of the Spanish Main
