= Barbary (disambiguation) =

Barbary or Barbary Coast or Barbary states is the term used by Europeans from the 16th century until the 19th century to refer to the coastal regions of what are now Morocco, Algeria, Tunisia, and Libya.

Barbary may also refer to:

== People ==
- Barrie Barbary (born 1939), former Australian rules footballer
- Craig Barbary (born 1960), former Australian rules footballer
- Cyriel Barbary (1899-2004), last known Belgian veteran of the First World War
- Red Barbary (Donald Odell Barbary, 1920-2003), American MLB player
- Miss Barbary, a fictional character in the 1852-53 novel Bleak House by Charles Dickens

== Natural history ==
- Barbary bulbul (Pycnonotus barbatus), a species of bird
- Barbary dove (Streptopelia risoria), a species of bird
- Barbary duck or Muscovy duck (Cairina moschata), a species of bird
- Barbary falcon (Falco pelegrinoides), a species of bird
- Barbary fig (Opuntia ficus-indica), a species of cactus
- Barbary ground squirrel (Atlantoxerus getulus), a species of rodent
- Barbary horse or Barb or Berber horse, a northern African breed of horse
- Barbary lamb, a legendary zoophyte, once believed to grow sheep as its fruit
- Barbary leopard (Panthera pardus panthera), a subspecies
- Barbary lion, a Panthera leo leo population in North Africa that is regionally extinct today
- Barbary macaque or Barbary ape or magot (Macaca sylvanus), a species
  - Barbary macaques in Gibraltar
- Barbary nut (Moraea sisyrinchium), a species of flowering plant
- Barbary ostrich (Struthio camelus camelus), a subspecies of bird
- Barbary partridge (Alectoris barbara), a species of bird
- Barbary sheep (Ammotragus lervia) a species of caprid (goat-antelope)
- Barbary skipper (Muschampia mohammed), a species of butterfly
- Barbary stag (Cervus elaphus barbarus), a subspecies of red deer
- Barbary striped grass mouse (Lemniscomys barbarus), a species of rodent
- Barbary striped hyena (Hyaena hyaena barbara), a subspecies
- Campanian Barbary, a breed of domestic sheep

== Other ==
- Barbary (novel), a 1986 science fiction novel by Vonda McIntyre
- Barbary Company, a trading company established by Queen Elizabeth I of England in 1585
- Barbary Crusade, a 1390 Franco-Genoese military expedition against the Barbary pirates
- Barbary Lane, a fictionalised version of Macondray Lane, San Francisco created by Armistead Maupin in Tales of the City
- Barbary organ, another name for barrel organ
- Barbary pirates or Barbary corsairs, Ottoman and Maghrebis pirates and privateers who operated from North Africa
- Barbary slave trade
  - Slavery on the Barbary Coast
- Barbary treaties, between the United States of America and the Barbary States
- Barbary Wars, a series of conflicts that culminated in two wars fought between the United States, Sweden, and the Barbary states
  - First Barbary War (1801–1805)
  - Second Barbary War (1815)
- Third Barbary War, a 2011 multi-state NATO-led military intervention in Libya
- Langue de Barbarie – Peninsula and national park in Senegal

== See also ==
- Barbari (disambiguation)
- Barbar (disambiguation)
- "Barbary Allen", an alternative title of the song "Barbara Allen"
- Barbary Coast (disambiguation)
- Barbary Pirate (film), a 1949 American swashbuckler film
- Barbary Sheep (film), a 1917 American silent film
- Barbary Shore, a 1951 novel by Norman Mailer
- Epitafium dla Barbary Radziwiłłówny, a 1982 Polish historical film
- "Proposals for concerted operation among the powers at war with the Pyratical states of Barbary", a 1786 letter by Thomas Jefferson
