= Barbarism =

Barbarism, barbarity, or barbarous may refer to:

- Barbarism (linguistics), a non-standard word, expression, or pronunciation
  - Hybrid words, formerly called "barbarisms"
- Any society construed as barbarian
  - Barbarian invasions, a period of migrations within or into Europe in the middle of the first millennium AD

== See also ==
- Barbary
- Berber (disambiguation)
- Barbary Coast
- Barbary Pirates
- Abuse (disambiguation)
- Barbarian (disambiguation)
- Barbarous name, a meaningless or seemingly meaningless word used in magic rituals
- Socialism or Barbarism (disambiguation)
- Primitive Culture (book), 1871 book about "primitive" versus "civilised" societies
- War crime, an act that constitutes a serious violation of the law of war
