= Barbar =

Barbar can refer to:

- Barbar, Bahrain, a village in the north of Bahrain
- Barbar (beer), a beer made by the Lefebvre Brewery
- Mustafa Agha Barbar, a governor of the Ottoman provinces of Tripoli, Lebanon and Latakia, Syria for the Ottomans from 1800 to 1835
- Babur, founder of the Mughal Empire
- Berber, Sudan, also spelled Barbar
- Mount Pieter Botte, a mountain in Far North Queensland, Australia also known as Barbar

== See also ==
- Babar (disambiguation)
- Barber (disambiguation)
- Berber (disambiguation)
- Barbary (disambiguation)
- Barbari (disambiguation)
