= Barbaria =

Barbaria may refer to:

== Places ==
- Barbaria (Horn of Africa), two ancient regions in littoral Northeast Africa
- Barbaria (village), a village in West Bengal, India
- Barbagia, a mountain area of Sardinia (described by Cicero as a land of barbarians)
- Barbary Coast, in northwest Africa
- Cape Barbaria, Formentaria, Balearic Islands, Spain

== See also ==
- Chak Barbaria, a census town in West Bengal India
- Korgoth of Barbaria, a TV pilot episode
- Berbers, an ethnicity of several nations in Africa
- Barbarian (disambiguation)
