= Assam Medical College =

Medical college in Assam, India

Assam Medical College and Hospital
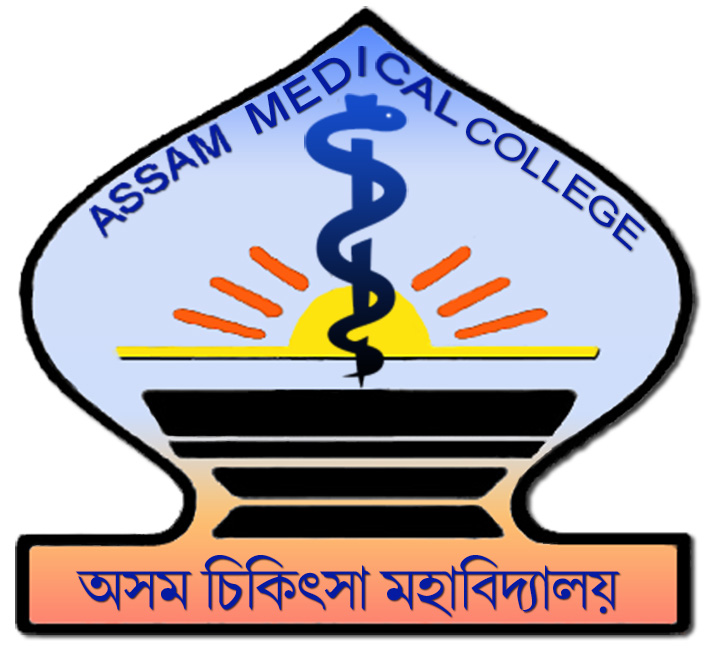
- Other name: AMCH
- Former name: Berry White Medical School (1900–1947)
- Type: Government medical school and hospital
- Established: 1900; 126 years ago
- Founder: John Berry White
- Affiliations: Srimanta Sankaradeva University of Health Sciences; NMC
- Principal: Dr. Sanjeeb Kakati
- Location: Barbari, Dibrugarh, Assam, India; 27.48756°N 94.94015°E
- Campus: Urban, 450 acres (180 ha)
- Website: amch-dibrugarh.assam.gov.in

Assam Medical College and Hospital (AMCH), formerly Berry White Medical School, is a government medical school and hospital in Dibrugarh, Assam, India. It was the first medical college in Assam and the whole of Northeast India. It is the tertiary medical referral centre for upper Assam and areas in neighbouring states, including Arunachal Pradesh. The college has been ranked 62 in the list of government institutes. It has been rated "AAA+" by the National Medical Commission with a score of 273.5.

The 450-acre (180 ha) college offers numerous facilities including sports facilities, canteens, ATMs, and more. The academic facilities include laboratories, libraries, Wi-Fi across the campus, providing internet access through PCs and laptops.

The college offers admission to 200 students each year from 2019. Before 2019, it offered admission to 170 students each year.

== History ==
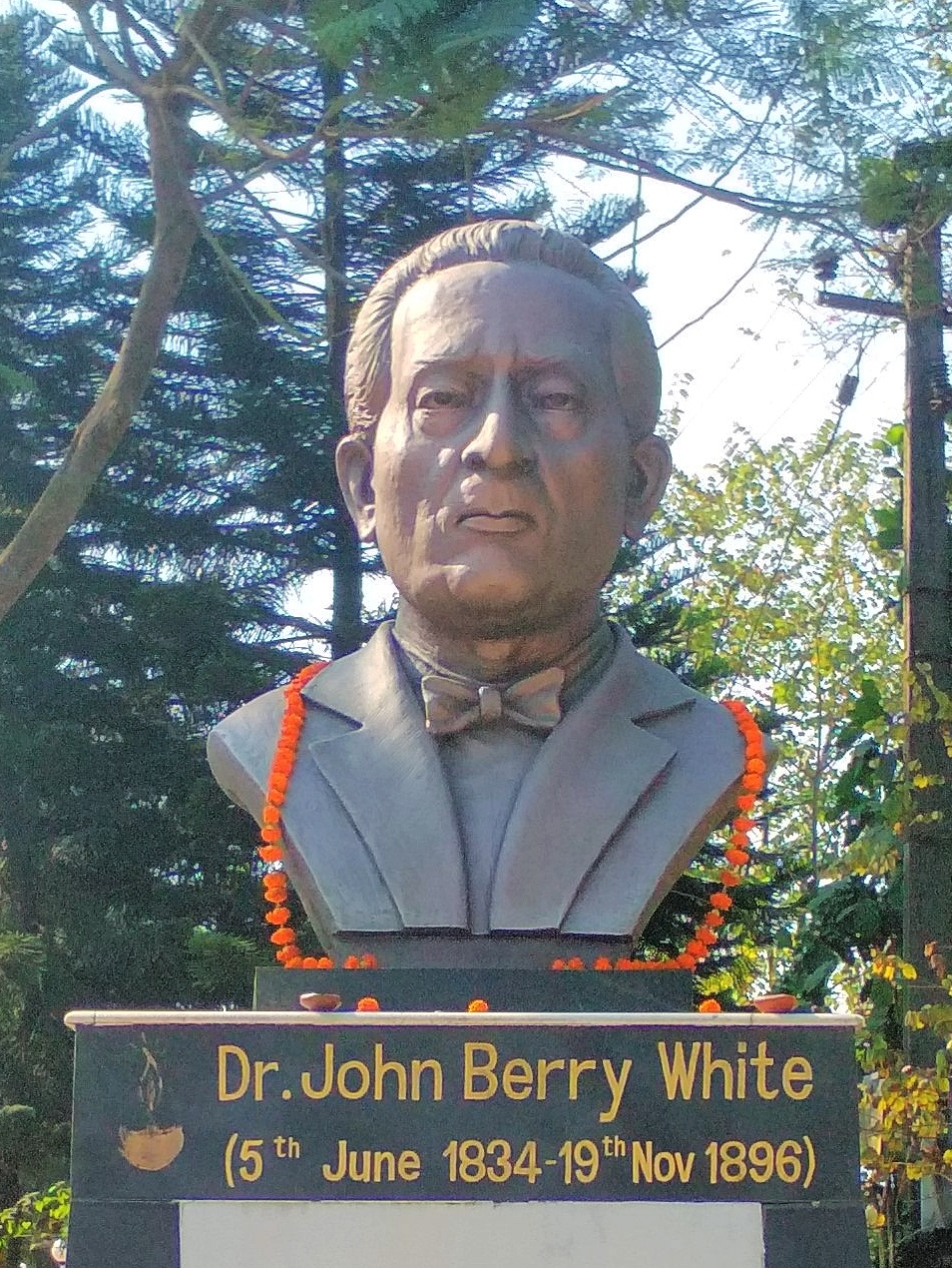
John Berry White who founded Berry White Medical School in 1900.

The college was founded as Berry White Medical School in 1900 with a large donation from Sir John Berry White. It was renamed Assam Medical College and Hospital on 3 November 1947. 3 November is celebrated as Foundation Day every year by students of the college. The Assam government has preserved the original Berry White Medical School building in Grahambazar, Dibrugarh. In 1910 the college imported two X-ray machines from England, which were the first in India, and opened the country's first radiology department.

On 12 February 2016, the Union Minister of Health and Family Welfare laid the foundation of a 192-bed super-specialty hospital with a 60-bed intensive care unit, a catheterization lab, and specialties in neurology, neurosurgery, cardiothoracic vascular surgery, nephrology, and paediatrics.

== Courses ==
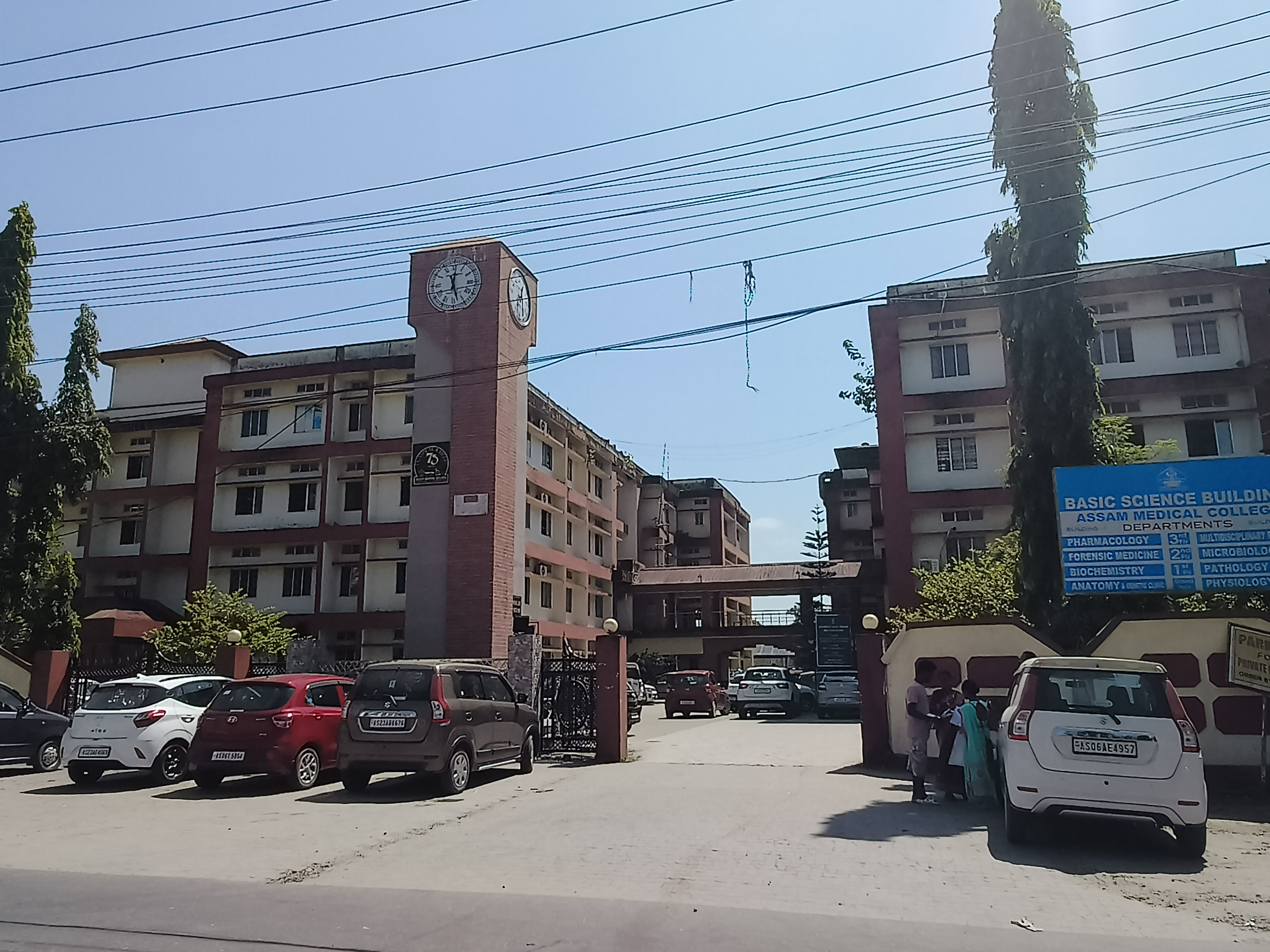
Basic Science Building

The college provides undergraduate and post-graduate education in:

- Community Medicine
- Medicine
- Nursing
- Midwifery
- Pharmacy
- Orthopaedics
- Cardiology
- Otorhinolaryngology
- General surgery
- Anatomy
- Physiology
- Pathology
- Biochemistry
- Ophthalmology
- Pediatrics
- Microbiology
- Obstetrics and Gynaecology
- Psychiatry
- Dentistry
- Neurology
- Pharmacology
- Forensics
- Anesthesiology
- Dermatology
- Plastic Surgery
- Radiology
- Physiotherapy

== Patient care ==
It runs outpatient departments in general medicine, general surgery, orthopaedics, ophthalmology, ENT, head & neck surgery, dermatology, pulmonary medicine, geriatric medicine, obstetrics and gynaecology, dentistry, paediatrics, physiotherapy and psychiatry. Special outpatient departments for rheumatology, diabetes, neurology, nephrology, cardiothoracic and vascular surgery, plastic surgery, paediatric surgery, urology, cardiology, neurosurgery run on specified days of the week. Emergency services run in casualty, paediatric medicine, obstetrics and psychiatry.

== Notable alumni ==
- Talimeren Ao
- Bhumidhar Barman
- Rathin Datta
- Upendra Devkota
- Jitendra Nath Gohain
- T. M. Lotha
- Ashis Roy
- Tapan Kumar Saikia
