= Lakshmi (1982 film) =

- Theatrical release poster
- Directed by: B.S.Thapa
- Written by: Faiz-Salim (dialogues)
- Screenplay by: B.S.Thapa
- Story by: B.S.Thapa
- Produced by: Raja & Desai
- Starring: Raj Babbar; Reena Roy; Ranjeet; Jeetendra (guest)
- Cinematography: Ramchandra
- Edited by: K. Nanda
- Music by: Usha Khanna
- Production company: Roy Films
- Release date: 11 August 1982
- Running time: 134 min
- Country: India
- Language: Hindi

Lakshmi is a 1982 Hindi-language drama film, produced by Raja and Desai under the Roy Films banner and directed by B.S. Thapa. It stars Raj Babbar and Reena Roy. Jeetendra makes a special appearance and music was composed by Usha Khanna.

== Cast ==
- Raj Babbar as Vijay Singh and Ajay Singh / Pappu (dual role)
- Reena Roy as Lakshmi / Neelam Bai
- Ranjeet as Habbu
- Jitendra as Qawali Singer Ravi Khurana
- Vinod Mehra as Mohan Saxena
- Kader Khan as Daku Imaandar
- Om Shivpuri as Tagore Saab
- Bharat Kapoor as Mothi Lal
- Danny Denzongpa as Lawyer Jagdishchandra Mathur
- Nadira as Tamana Bai
- Dina Pathak as Thakurain Savitri ,Vijay's mother
- Sulakshana Pandit as Qawali Singer Usha

== Soundtrack ==
#	Title	Singer(s)	Lyricist
1	"Kora Man Kori Kaya"	Asha Bhosle, Amit Kumar	Indeevar
2	"Haalat Se Ladna Mushkil Tha"	Asha Bhosle	Sahir Ludhianvi
3	"Kabhi Dekhe Khushiyaan Kabhi"	Asha Bhosle	Indeevar
4	"Shaam Peene Ki Phir"	Asha Bhosle	Kaifi Azmi
5	"Kya Baat Hai"	Asha Bhosle, Mahendra Kapoor	Kaifi Azmi
6	"Seeta Bhi Jahaan"	Mahendra Kapoor	Sahir Ludhianvi
