= Barbarian (disambiguation) =

A barbarian is to a person who is perceived to be uncivilized or primitive.

Barbarian may also refer to:

== Sports ==
=== Rugby ===
- Barbarian F.C. or the Barbarians, an invitational rugby union team based in Britain:
- Australian Barbarians
- Barbarian Rugby Club, more commonly known as the French Barbarians
- Brussels Barbarians
- New Zealand Barbarians
- South African Barbarians

=== Wrestling ===
- The Barbarian (wrestler) (born 1958), shortened from Konga the Barbarian, ring name of professional wrestler Sione Vailahi
- Nord the Barbarian, ring name of professional wrestler John Nord
- The Barbarian, ring name used in Germany by professional wrestler Dave Sullivan (wrestler)

== Games ==
- Barbarian: The Ultimate Warrior, a 1987 fighting game by Palace Software
- Barbarian (1987 video game), a 1987 platform game by Psygnosis/Melbourne House
- Barbarian (2002 video game), a 2002 fighting game by Titus
- Barbarian (Dungeons & Dragons), a character class in the fantasy game
- The Barbarians (board game), a 1981 board game
- Barbarian, a character class in Diablo II, and Diablo III
- Barbarian, a troop from the mobile strategy game Clash of Clans and Clash Royale

== Arts and entertainment ==
- Barbarians, a series of comics published by Atlas/Seaboard Comics
- The Barbarians, an opera by Constantine Koukias based on a poem by Constantine P. Cavafy
- The Barbarians, a series of novels set in the Dragonlance realm
- The Barbarians (painting), a 1937 painting by German Surrealist Max Ernst

=== Music ===
- The Barbarians (band), a 1960s American garage band
- "The Barbarian" (song), a 1970 piece from Emerson, Lake & Palmer, after Béla Bartók's Allegro barbaro
- "The Barbarians", a 2021 song by Greta Van Fleet from their album The Battle at Garden's Gate
- "Barbarian", a 1981 song by INXS from their album Underneath the Colours
- "Barbarian", a 2005 song by August Burns Red from their album Thrill Seeker
- "Barbarian", a 2011 song by E-40 from his album Revenue Retrievin': Graveyard Shift
- "Barbarian", a 2015 song by The Darkness from their album Last of Our Kind
- "Barbarians", a 2015 song by The Libertines from their album Anthems for Doomed Youth
- "Barbarian", a 2022 song by Lil Durk from his album 7220
- "Barbarian", a 2026 song by Kreator from their album Krushers of the World

=== Film ===
- The Barbarian (1920 film), an American silent drama based on a short story by Theodore Seixas Solomons
- The Barbarian (1933 film), also titled A Night in Cairo, an American romantic drama starring Ramon Novarro
- Barbarians (1953 film), a Soviet drama based on Maxim Gorky's 1905 play of the same name
- The Barbarians (1960 film), also titled Revak the Rebel, a historical epic starring Jack Palance
- The Barbarians (1987 film), an English-language swords-and-sorcery film, an American-Italian co-production
- Barbarian (2003 film), an American sword-and-sorcery film starring Michael O'Hearn and Martin Kove
- Barbarians (2021 film), a British thriller film
- Barbarian (2022 film), an American horror film

=== Television ===
- Barbarians (miniseries), a 2004 History Channel documentary TV series about invading tribes during the Roman Empire
- Terry Jones' Barbarians, a 2006 BBC documentary TV series about Roman and Roman Catholic notion of barbarians
- Barbarians (2020 TV series), a German TV series set during the Roman Empire's occupation of Germania

== See also ==
- Barbaria (disambiguation)
- Barbaric, a superhero from Image Comics' Freak Force
- Barbarism (disambiguation)
- Berbers, an ethnicity of several nations in Africa
- Conan the Barbarian, a fictional character created by Robert E. Howard
- Dave the Barbarian, an American TV series
- John Nord (born 1959), professional wrestler, ring name "Nord the Barbarian"
- 234 Barbara, the prototype of a class of asteroids known as "Barbarians"
