= Ghadge =

Ghadge may refer to:

== People ==
- Jeetendra Ghadge, an Indian activist
- Yeshwant Ghadge, an Indian recipient of the Victoria Cross

== Other ==
- Ghadge & Suun, an Indian television series
- Karanja, Wardha, a town in India
