= Barbari =

Barbari may refer to:

- Barbari, Latin for Barbarians
- Barbari (surname), list of people with the surname
- Barbari (AMC Area), Dibrugarh, Assam, India
- Barbari bread, Iranian flatbread
- Barbari goat, breed of goat from India
- Barbari Roma Nord, American football team from Rome

== See also ==
- Barbary (disambiguation)
