= Jitendra =

Jithendra
Other names
- Related names: Jeetendra/Jithendra/Jatinder/Jatindra/ Jatindar/Jeetendar/Jeetender/Jitender/Jitendar

Jithendra or Jeetendra is a common first name in India.

Jitendra is derived from two words jeet + indra which means "one who has conquered Indra". The word 'Jitendra' may have originated from 'Jitendriya' which means "one who has conquered the senses". It is also one of the names of Gautama Buddha, and Hanuman.

Notable people bearing this name include:

- J_Jitendra, MEP Manager from Ashok Nagar Madhya Pradesh
- Jeetendra, Indian film actor
- Jeetendra Ghadge, Indian activist
- Jeetendra Singh Bundela, Indian politician of Bharatiya Janata Party
- Jitendra Abhisheki, Indian classical music performer
- Jitendra Awhad, Indian politician
- Jitendra Durga Maharaj, Fijian sports administrator
- Jitendra Jatashankar Rawal, Indian astrophysicist
- Jitendra Joshi, Indian Marathi actor
- Jitendra Karki, Nepalese cricketer
- Jitendra Kumar Bablu Bhaiya, Indian politician
- Jeetendra Madnani (born 1978), better known as Jeet, Indian actor
- Jitendra Malik, Professor at the University of California, Berkeley
- Jitendra Mishra, Film maker & promoter
- Jitendra Narayan, the Maharaja of Cooch-Behar, India
- Jitendra Nath Gohain, Indian surgeon
- Jitendra Nath Mohanty, professor of Philosophy
- Jitendra Patel, Canadian cricketer
- Jitendra Prasada, Indian politician
- Jitendra Redkar, Omani cricketer
- Jitendra Singh, Indian politician of Indian National Congress
- Jitendra Singh, Indian politician of Bharatiya Janata Party
