= Berber =

Berber or Berbers may refer to:

== Ethnic group ==
- Berbers, an ethnic group native to Northern Africa
- Berber languages, a family of Afro-Asiatic languages

== Places ==
- Berber, Sudan, a town on the Nile

== People with the surname ==
- Ady Berber (1913–1966), Austrian film actor
- Alejandro Berber (born 1987), Mexican footballer
- Anita Berber (1899–1928), German dancer, actress, and writer
- Fatiha Berber (1945–2015), Algerian actress
- Felix Berber (1871–1930), German violinist
- Fritz Berber (1898–1984), member of the Nazi administration in Germany until 1943
- Kübra Berber (born 1996), Turkish women's footballer
- Mersad Berber (1940–2012), Bosnian painter
- Oğuzhan Berber (born 1992), Turkish footballer
- Philip Berber (born 1958), Irish American entrepreneur and philanthropist
- Yolande Berbers, Belgian computer scientist
- Zoya Berber (born 1987), Russian actress

== Other uses ==
- Berber carpet, a type of carpet hand-woven by the Berber autochthones in North Africa and the Sahara
- Berber the Moor, a fictional character in The Bastard Executioner

== See also ==
- Barbaria (East Africa) or Bilad-al-Barbar, the ancient and medieval name of Somalia
- Berbera, a port city in Somalia
- Berbere, a spice mixture from Ethiopia
