= Rathin Datta =

Indian physician (1931–2020)

- Born: 1931; Mangaldoi, Assam, British India
- Died: 27 January 2020 (aged 88); Kolkata, West Bengal, India
- Occupation: Physician
- Awards: Padma Shri (1992); Friends of Liberation War Honour (2012)

Rathin Datta (1931 – 27 January 2020) was an Indian physician from Tripura. He was a recipient of Padma Shri and Friends of Liberation War Honour.

== Biography ==
Datta was born in 1931 at Mangaldoi in Assam. He completed his schooling at Shillong. Later, he completed graduation from Assam Medical College in Dibrugarh. He interned under Bidhan Chandra Roy. Then, he went to London for Fellowship of the Royal Colleges of Surgeons.

After returning to India Datta joined Tripura Health Services in the late sixties. During the Liberation War of Bangladesh he gave treatment to the freedom fighters of Bangladesh and Indian soldiers. He saved many lives in 1971. He retired from service as the director and special secretary of the Tripura Health Services in 1992.

Datta was conferred Padma Shri in 1992 for his contribution in medicine. He was the second person from Tripura who received Padma Shri. He received Friends of Liberation War Honour in 2012 for his contribution to the Liberation War of Bangladesh.

Datta died on 27 January 2020 at his own home in Kolkata at the age of 88.
