= Adamas Institute of Technology =

College in West Bengal

- Type: Private
- Established: 2008; 18 years ago
- Affiliation: MAKAUT
- Address: Barasat Barrackpore Road, Barbaria, P.O. - Jagannathpur, India - 700 126, Barasat, West Bengal, 700126, India; 22.738117°N 88.4570146°E
- Approvals: AICTE
- Website: http://www.adamas.co.in/technology
- Location in West Bengal Adamas Institute of Technology (India)

The Adamas Institute of Technology or AIT is an engineering college in West Bengal, India.It was established in 2008 by RICE Education Group. The college is affiliated with Maulana Abul Kalam Azad University of Technology and all of its programmes are approved by the All India Council for Technical Education.

The campus is located along Barasat - Barrackpore Road, Barbaria, North 24 Parganas.

== See also ==
- List of institutions of higher education in West Bengal
- Education in India
- Education in West Bengal
