= Kokapur, West Bengal =

Kokapur
- Census Town
- Location in West Bengal, India Kokapur (India)
- Coordinates: 22.754176°N 88.442803°E
- Country: India
- State: West Bengal
- District: North 24 Parganas

Area
  - Total: 1.48 km^{2} (0.57 sq mi)

Population (2011)
  - Total: 6,317
  - Density: 4,270/km^{2} (11,100/sq mi)

Languages
  - Official: Bengali, English
- Time zone: UTC+5:30 (IST)
- PIN: 700126
- Telephone code: +91 33
- ISO 3166 code: IN-WB
- Vehicle registration: WB
- Lok Sabha constituency: Barasat
- Website: north24parganas.nic.in

Kokapur is a census town in the Barasat I CD block of the Barasat Sadar subdivision in the North 24 Parganas district in the Indian state of West Bengal.

== Geography ==
Cities, towns and locations in Barasat subdivision, North 24 Parganas
M: municipal town, CT: census town, R: rural/ urban centre, H: historical centre
Owing to space constraints in the small map, the actual locations in a larger map may vary slightly

=== Location ===
Kokapur is located at 22.754176°N 88.442803°E.

Kokapur, Chak Barbaria, Barbaria, Berunanpukuria and Jagannathpur form a loose cluster of villages and census towns along State Highway 2 (locally known as Barasat-Barrackpore Road), close to Barasat.

Duttapukur police station has jurisdiction over Barasat I CD Block.

=== Area overview ===
The area covered in the map alongside is largely a part of the north Bidyadhari Plain. located in the lower Ganges Delta. The country is flat. It is a little raised above flood level and the highest ground borders the river channels. 54.67% of the people of the densely populated area lives in the urban areas and 45.33% lives in the rural areas.

Note: The map alongside presents some of the notable locations in the subdivision. All places marked in the map are linked in the larger full screen map.

== Demographics ==
As of 2011 India census, Kokapur had a population of 6,317; of this, 3,248 are male, 3,069 female. It has an average literacy rate of 82.34%, higher than the national average of 74.04%.

== Infrastructure ==
As per District Census Handbook 2011, Kokapur covered an area of 1.4826 km^{2}. It had 9 primary schools and 1 middle school, the nearest secondary school and senior secondary were 2 km away at Nilganj. The nearest degree college was 1 km away at Berunanpukuria. The nearest hospital was 8 km away, the nearest family welfare centre 5 km away, the nearest maternity and child welfare centre 5 km away, and the nearest maternity home 15 km away.

== Transport ==
State Highway 2 (locally known as Barasat-Barrackpore Road) passes through Kokapur.

The nearest railway stations are Barasat Junction railway station on the Sealdah-Bangaon line and Barrackpore railway station on the Sealdah-Ranaghat line.

== Healthcare ==
North 24 Parganas district has been identified as one of the areas where ground water is affected by arsenic contamination.

== See also ==
Map of Barasat I CD Block on Page 393 of District Census Handbook.
