= John Berry White =

British philanthropist (1834–1896)

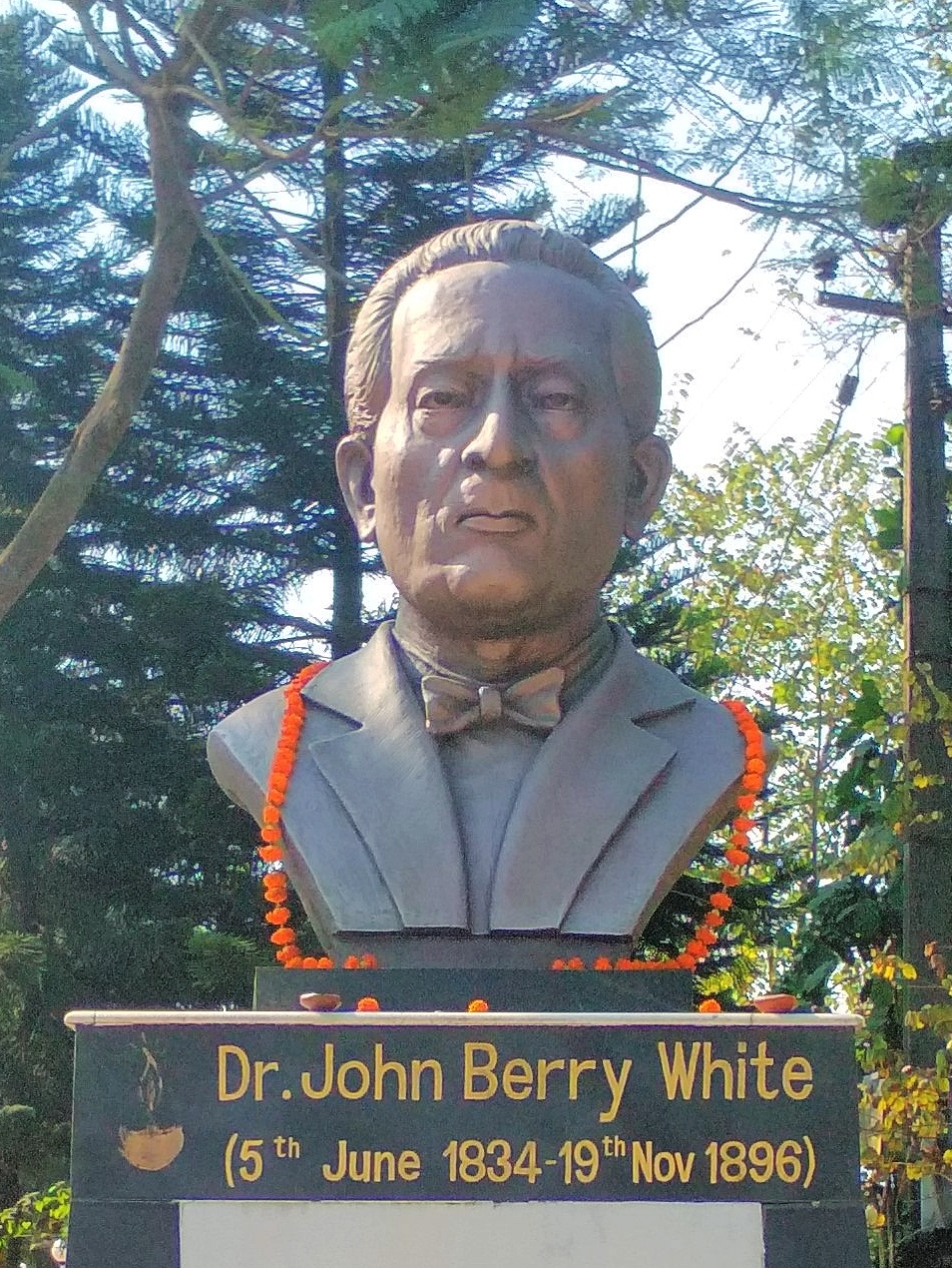
Bust of John Berry White at Assam Medical College, Dibrugarh.

Dr John Berry White (1834–1896) was a British philanthropist and brigadier of the British Army, and later the civil surgeon of the erstwhile Lakhimpur district in 1870.

== Life and career ==
In 1857, White was commissioned as an assistant surgeon under the East India Company and was posted in Upper Assam, where he arrived in 1858 at the age of 24. He served the Upper Assam areas in various capacities for 24 years and rose to the position of Civil Surgeon of the then Lakhimpur district. He is considered the pioneer of health education and health care in Assam.

He donated his personal savings of Rs50,000 to set up a medical institution in Dibrugarh, but it was only after his retirement and death in 1896 that his admirers took up his dream. The end result was the Berry White Medical School (BWMS), now known as the Assam Medical College at Dibrugarh. The old building where the Berry Medical School was founded has been given a historical tag and is being maintained as a historical monument.

White was the member of the medical board for tea garden communities at that time. He also held a 25% interest in the newspaper publication company The Times of Assam.

White died in London on 19 November 1896, and the BWMS came into reality in 1900.
