= Berunanpukuria =

- Village
- Location in West Bengal, India Berunanpukuria (India)
- Coordinates: 22.7281759°N 88.4535027°E
- Country: India
- State: West Bengal
- District: North 24 Parganas

Population (2011)
  - Total: 2,188

Languages
  - Official: Bengali, English
- Time zone: UTC+5:30 (IST)
- PIN: 700126
- Telephone/STD code: +91 33
- Lok Sabha constituency: Bangaon
- Vidhan Sabha constituency: Swarupnagar
- Website: north24parganas.nic.in

Berunanpukuria is a village in the Barasat I CD block in the Barasat Sadar subdivision of the North 24 Parganas district in the Indian state of West Bengal.

== Geography ==
Cities, towns and locations in Barasat subdivision, North 24 Parganas
M: municipal town, CT: census town, R: rural/ urban centre, H: historical centre
Owing to space constraints in the small map, the actual locations in a larger map may vary slightly

=== Location ===
Berunanpukuria is located at 22.7281759°N 88.4535027°E.

Berunanpukuria, Barbaria, Jagannathpur, Kokapur and Chak Barbaria form a loose cluster of villages and census towns along State Highway 2 (locally known as Barasat-Barrackpore Road), close to Barasat.

=== Area overview ===
The area covered in the map alongside is largely a part of the north Bidyadhari Plain. located in the lower Ganges Delta. The country is flat. It is a little raised above flood level and the highest ground borders the river channels. 54.67% of the people of the densely populated area lives in the urban areas and 45.33% lives in the rural areas.

Note: The map alongside presents some of the notable locations in the subdivision. All places marked in the map are linked in the larger full screen map.

== Demographics ==
According to the 2011 Census of India, Berunanpukhuria had a total population of 2,188, of which 1,153 (53%) were males and 1,035 (47%) were females. Population in the age range 0–6 years was 260. The total number of literate persons in Berunanpukhuria was 1,460 (75.73% of the population over 6 years).

== Transport ==
Berunanpukuria is on the State Highway 2 (locally known as Barrackpore-Barasat Road) in the vicinity of Barasat town.

The nearest railway station is Barasat Junction railway station on the Sealdah-Bangaon line.

== Education ==
West Bengal State University, located at Berunanpukria, was established in 2008. In 2018, WBSU has made it to the comprehensive list of the best public universities in Bengal. The rating was by Careers 369, the country's largest education and career counselling portal. It offers undergraduate, post graduate and doctoral programmes. An affiliating university, as of 2018, all 46 colleges in North 24 Parganas are affiliated to it. The boys hostel is functional and the girls hostel is getting ready.

Kingston College of Science and Kingston Law College were established at Berunanpukuria in 2004.
