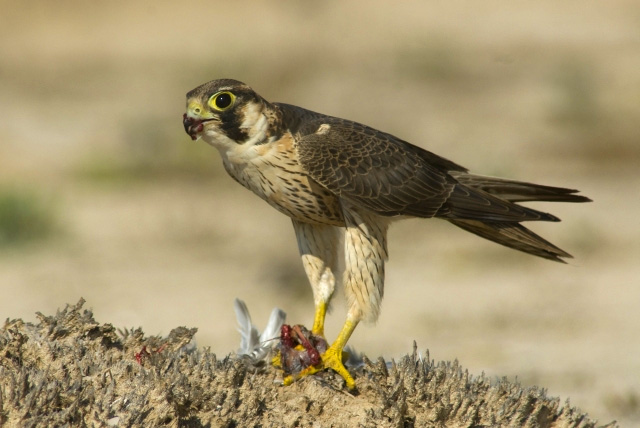
- CITES Appendix I

Scientific classification
- Kingdom: Animalia
- Phylum: Chordata
- Class: Aves
- Order: Falconiformes
- Family: Falconidae
- Genus: Falco
- Species: F. peregrinus
- Subspecies: F. p. pelegrinoides

Trinomial name
- Falco peregrinus pelegrinoides Temminck, 1829

= Barbary falcon =

Subspecies of bird

The Barbary falcon (Falco peregrinus pelegrinoides) is a non-migratory subspecies of the peregrine falcon found from the Canary Islands eastwards across some parts of North Africa to the Middle East. It was formerly often treated as a distinct species Falco pelegrinoides; when so treated, it also included the central Asian peregrine falcon subspecies Falco peregrinus babylonicus as a subspecies (Falco pelegrinoides babylonicus).

== Description ==
The Barbary falcon is a bird of semi-desert and dry open hills. It typically lays its eggs in cliff-ledge nests.

It is similar to other subspecies of the peregrine falcon, but smaller at 33–39 cm (13–15 in) length with a wingspan of 76–98 cm (30–39 in). It has characteristic plumage, and adults can be recognised from peregrines. Some regard it as a distinct species since it is specialised to a desert environment. Recently, it has been found to be genetically similar to other subspecies of the peregrine falcon, so it is now considered a subspecies of that.

The female is larger than the male. It resembles its relative in general structure. Female Barbary falcons are as large as male peregrine falcons.

Adults have paler grey-blue upperparts than the peregrine falcon and often have a buff wash to the barred underparts, whereas the larger species has a whiter background colour. The nape is rufous, but this is difficult to see.

Sexes are similar, apart from size, but the young birds have brown upperparts and streaked underparts. The streaking is lighter than in the juvenile peregrine falcon.

The call is a high-pitched "rek-rek-rek".

The Barbary falcon also bears some resemblance to the lanner falcon, but can be distinguished from that species at rest by its size and in the head-pattern, flight, flight action and underwing pattern.

== Distribution ==
The Barbary falcon is native to parts of North and East Africa (Algeria, the Canary Islands, Egypt, Eritrea, Libya, Morocco, Niger, Nigeria, Sudan, Somalia and Tunisia), Israel, Syria, Jordan, and Saudi Arabia. Birds formerly included in the barbary falcon in central and southwest Asia, particularly in Afghanistan, westernmost China, the far north of India, Iran, Iraq, Kazakhstan, Kuwait, Kyrgyzstan, Oman, Pakistan, Tajikistan, Turkmenistan, the United Arab Emirates and Uzbekistan are of the closely similar peregrine falcon subspecies F. p. babylonicus.

It is a vagrant in Burkina Faso, Cameroon, Djibouti, Greece, Italy, Kenya, Lebanon, Mali, Malta, Nepal, Portugal, Qatar, Senegal and Turkey.

== Taxonomy ==
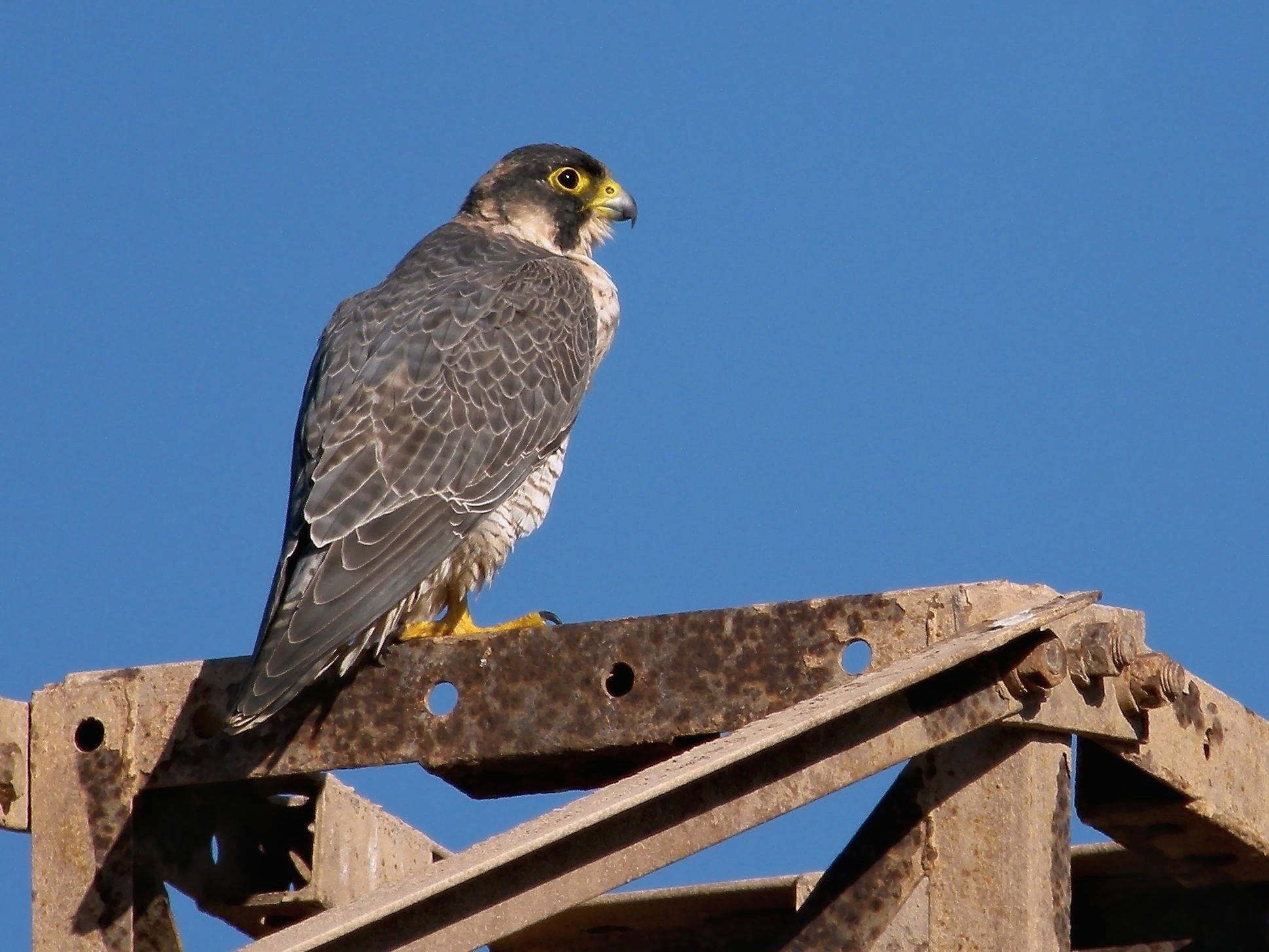
Barbary falcon on Lanzarote, Canary Islands

The Barbary falcon differs in appearance from the peregrine falcon according to Gloger's rule. The genetic distance is slight and the species form a close-knit and somewhat paraphyletic group in DNA sequence analyses, and all the major taxonomic authorities now consider it conspecific. They differ more in behaviour, ecology and anatomy than usual for conspecifics. They are able to produce fertile hybrids, but they are generally allopatric and only co-occur during breeding season in small areas such as the Maghreb, the Punjab, Khorasan and possibly the Mongolian Altai and there is clear evidence of assortative mating, with hybridization hardly ever occurring under natural conditions. In short, though they occupy adjacent territories, they breed at different times of the year and Barbary falcons virtually never breed with peregrine falcons in nature.

Assuming a genetic distance of 2% in hierofalcons corresponds to a divergence roughly 200,000–130,000 years ago, the 0.6–0.7% genetic distance in the peregrine falcon-Barbary falcon ("peregrinoid") complex suggests its current taxa evolved in the Late Pleistocene some 100,000 years ago or less, but before the Upper Paleolithic. The presumed time of divergence between peregrine falcons and Barbary falcons approximately coincides with the start of the last ice age, when desertification was prominent in North Africa and the Middle East and the Persian Gulf became a landlocked inland sea that slowly dried up. Populations of ancestral "peregrinoid" falcons living in marginal habitat at the fringe of the African-Middle Eastern desert belt either adapted (and might have become isolated; e.g., in the Persian Gulf region, which turned into semiarid habitat surrounded by vast deserts), left for better habitat, or became extinct. During interstadials, deserts receded and the aridland and humidland populations could expand to contact again, causing some limited gene flow. This scenario, by and large, parallels the proposed evolutionary history of the saker falcon in relation to the other hierofalcons; indeed, that group shows similar patterns of molecular paraphyly though it is of somewhat earlier origin.

The fossil record adds little to the issue. A humerus some 9,000 years old (i.e., after the last ice age) from the Aswan area in Egypt, where Falco peregrinus minor occurs today, was identified as belonging to the peregrine falcon. The Barbary falcon is one of the rare cases that may arguably be considered a species under the biological species concept, but certainly not under the phylogenetic species concept, rather than the other way around as usual. This case demonstrates that what makes a "species" is not only its descent, but also what happens to a population in the course of evolution, how it adapts and how this affects its reproductive isolation (or lack thereof) from sister taxa.

== Conservation and threats ==
The population of Barbary Falcons was once considered endangered but is now increasing. In the Canary Islands the population of breeding pairs increased from seven breeding pairs in 1988, restricted to the eastern islands, to 75 breeding pairs in 2006 across the entire archipelago. The species was thought to be extinct in Tenerife but a 2007 study found 26 breeding pairs on the island with potential for further increase indicated by suitable, unoccupied cliffs on the island. This increase has been attributed to increased urbanisation as the falcons primary food source is the domestic pigeon. Pigeon racing is a popular sport on the Canary Islands, leading the falcons to be persecuted by local pigeon racers. This human-wildlife conflict is exacerbated by misinformation such as the widespread belief that the falcons are not native to the islands.
