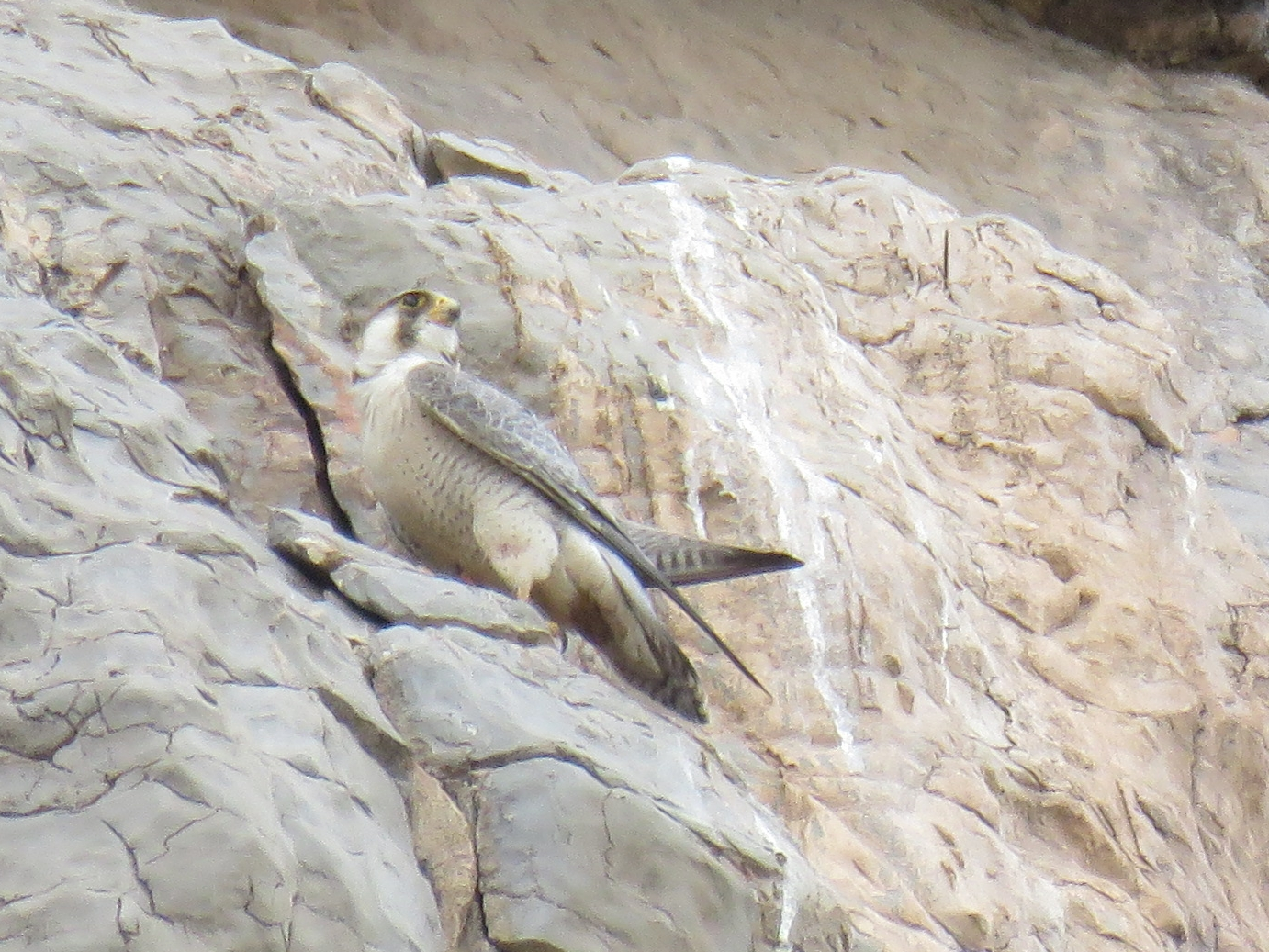
- CITES Appendix I

Scientific classification
- Kingdom: Animalia
- Phylum: Chordata
- Class: Aves
- Order: Falconiformes
- Family: Falconidae
- Genus: Falco
- Species: F. peregrinus
- Subspecies: F. p. babylonicus

Trinomial name
- Falco peregrinus babylonicus P.L. Sclater, 1861
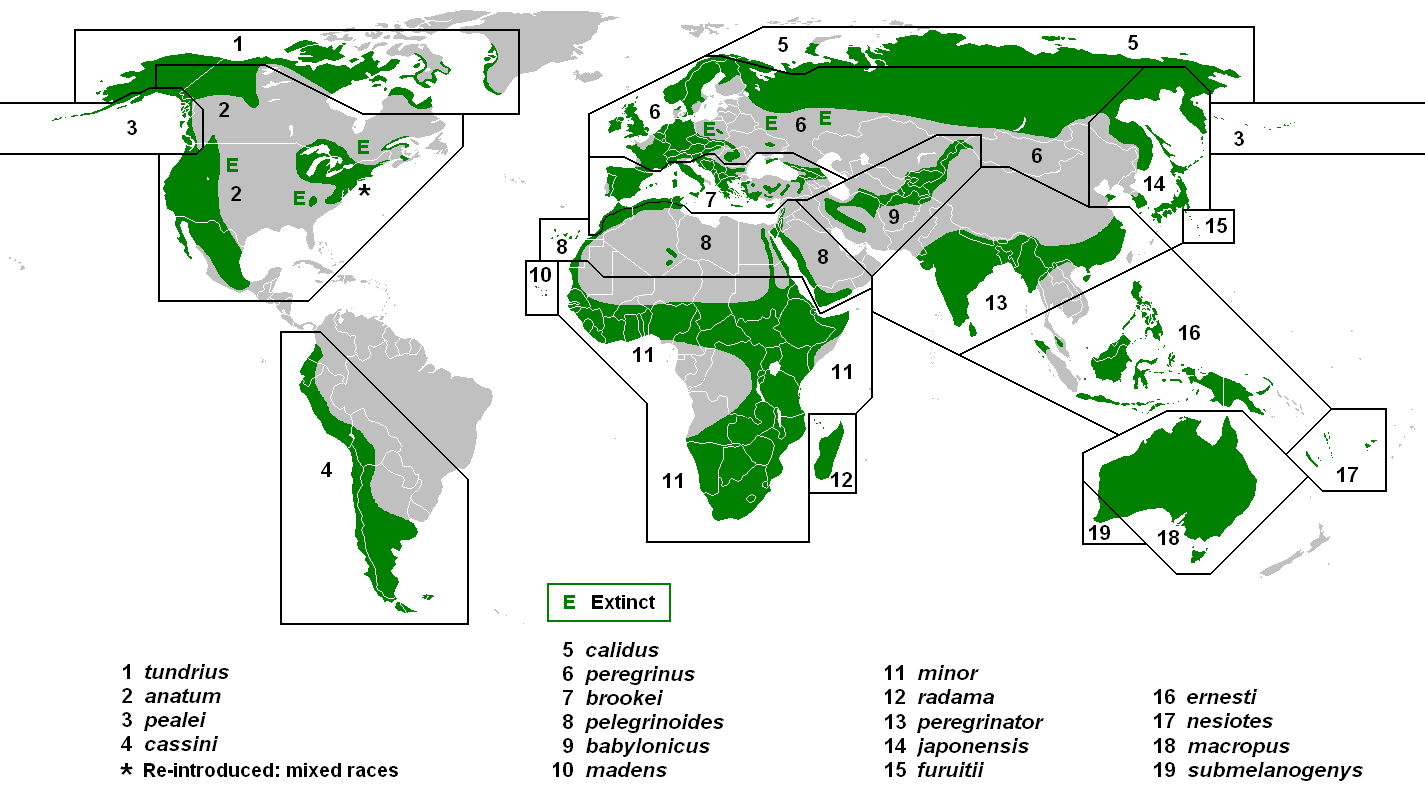
- The 9th item on the list of peregrine falcon subspecies

= Red-naped shaheen =

Subspecies of bird

The red-naped shaheen (Falco peregrinus babylonicus) is a non-migratory subspecies of the peregrine falcon. The subspecies is distributed from Mongolia, Kazakhstan to India and Iran.

== Description ==
Adults are paler than other subspecies of peregrine falcon. They show a greyish blue colour on their back. forehead and nape are rufous and crown is more dark. Their narrow moustashes have the same colour like their crown with rufous halo on edges. In comparison with other subspecies, F. p. babylonicus has fewer spots on chest, and abdomen and thighs with creamy background. After multiple moults the chest will be clear and a few V-shape spots remain on thighs and flanks. The tail has the same colour as the back, with darker barring.

Juveniles have brown back and crown with paler and rufous-buff forehead. Their moustaches are dark brown with rufous-buff edges. Their chest and thighs are streaked and have vertical barrs with cream background. Their tail is brown with darker barrings.

Flight feathers are longer in juveniles and after the first moulting they grow in the same size of adults. And after each moulting their lateral tail feathers grow lesser than the past year.

== Etymology ==
Linguists said that the Persian word شاهین (shaheen) is derived from the older world سئن (sa'en), meaning "big bird of prey".

== Gallery ==
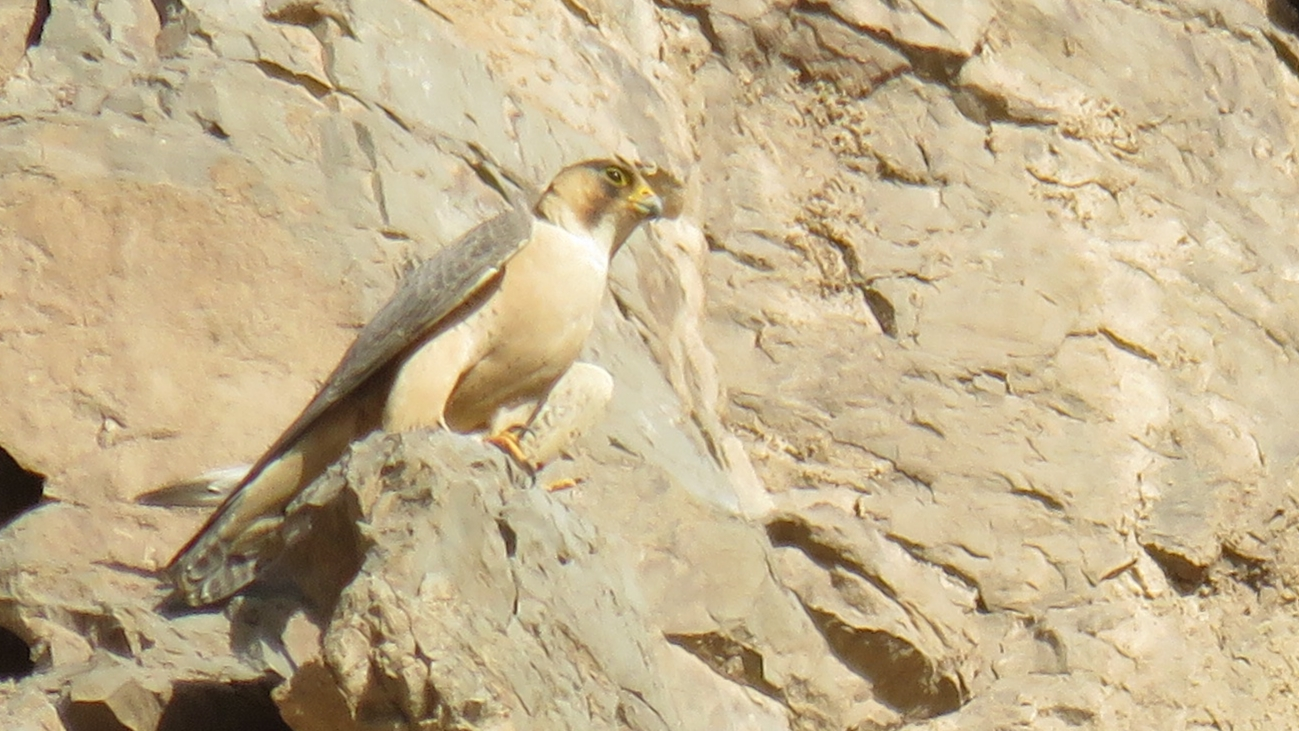
A male red-naped shaheen by its nest in Kerman, Kerman province, Iran

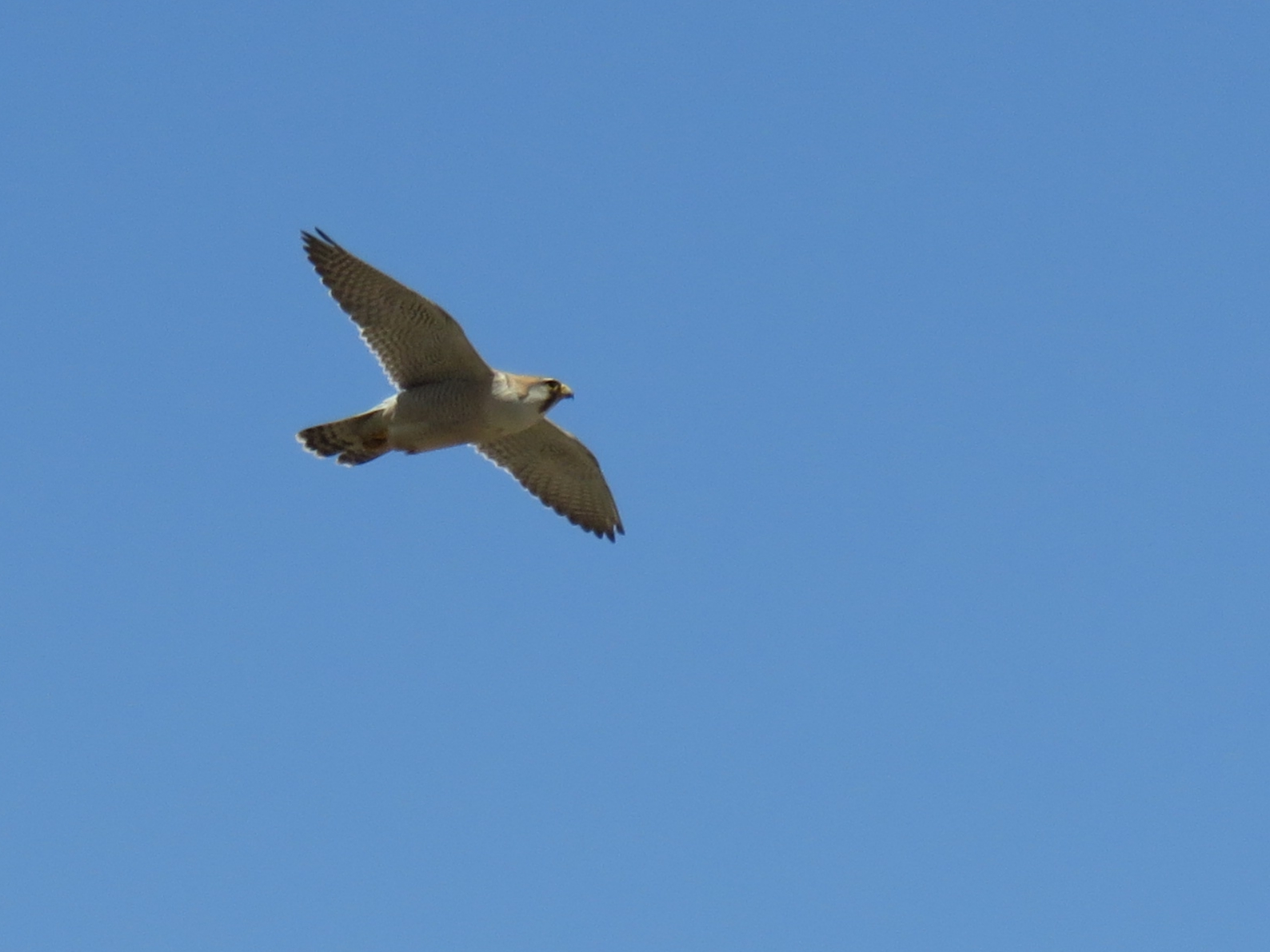
Female red-naped shaheen flying above its nest in Kerman

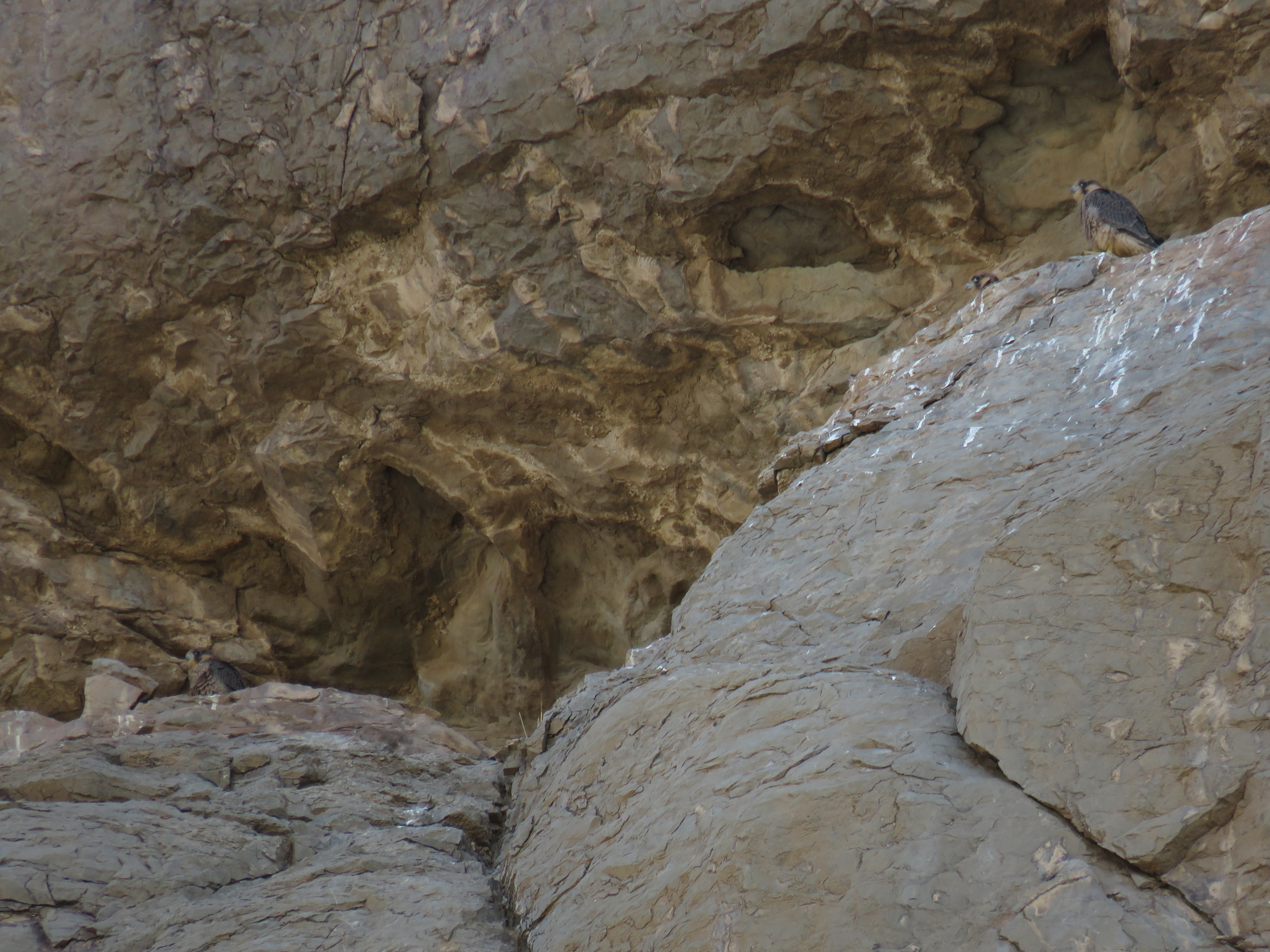
Red-naped chicks waiting for food in Kerman

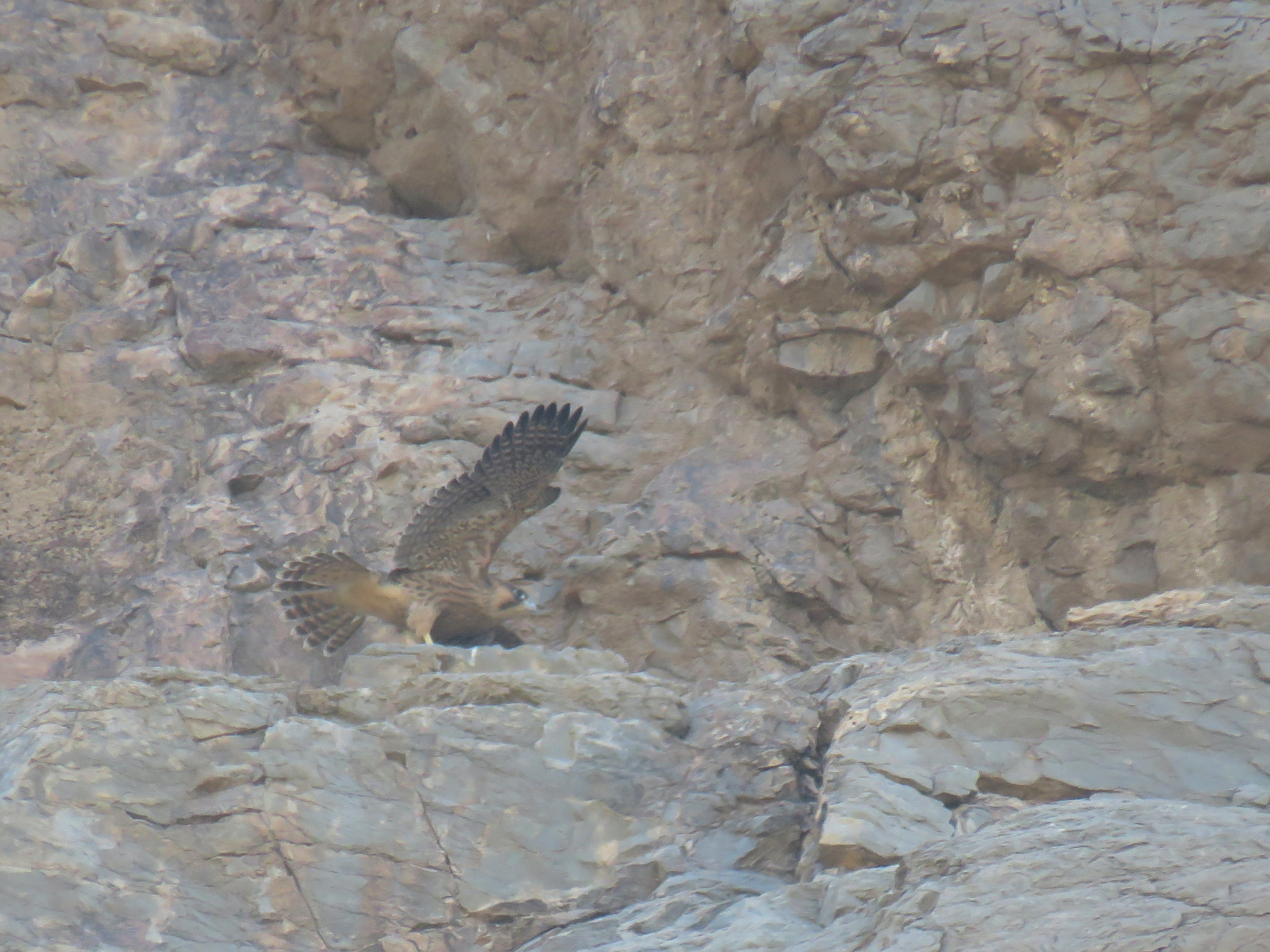
A chick exercising around its nest preparing to fly in Kerman

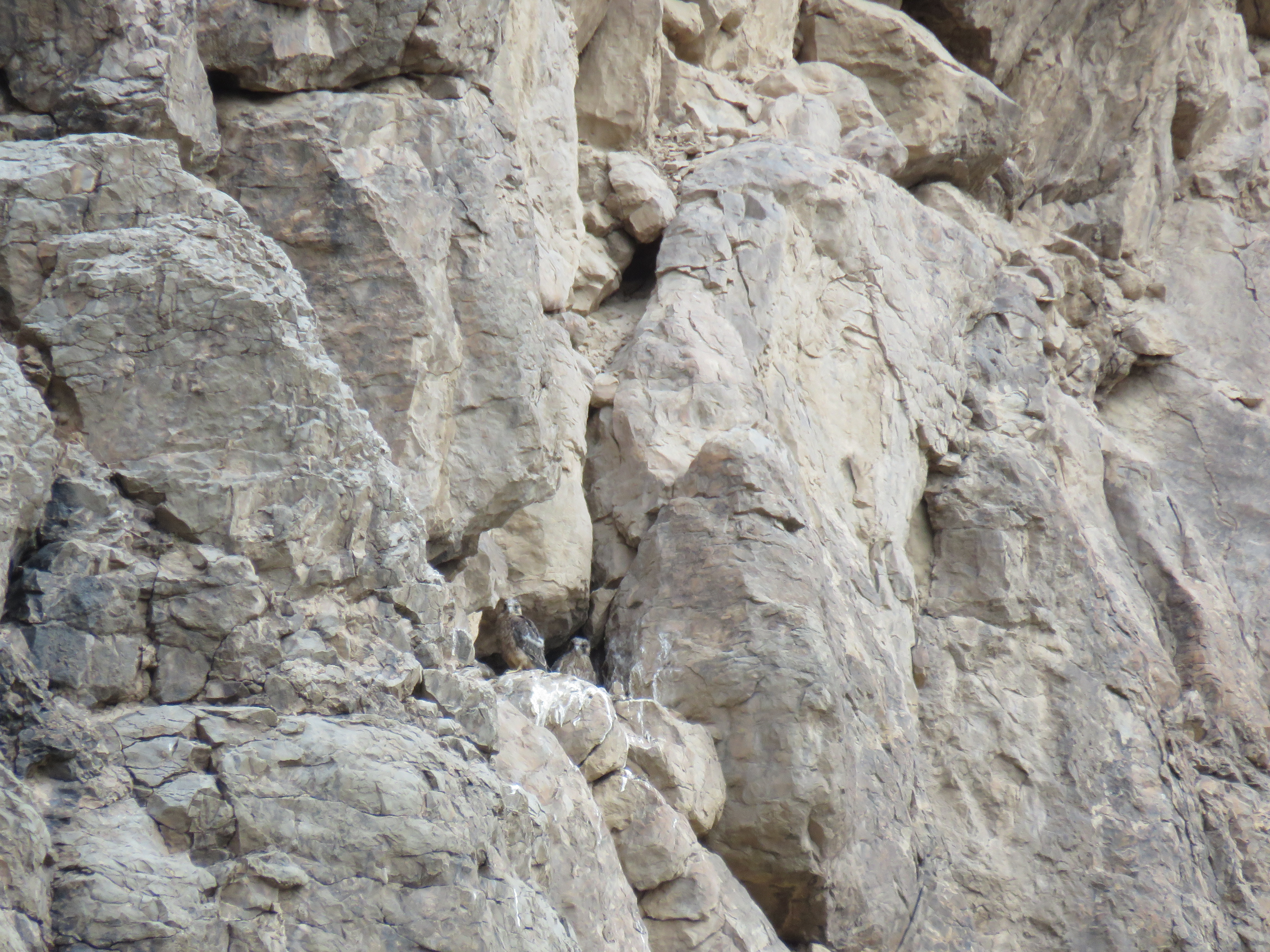
Waiting while their mother left the nest for having a meal nearby in Kerman

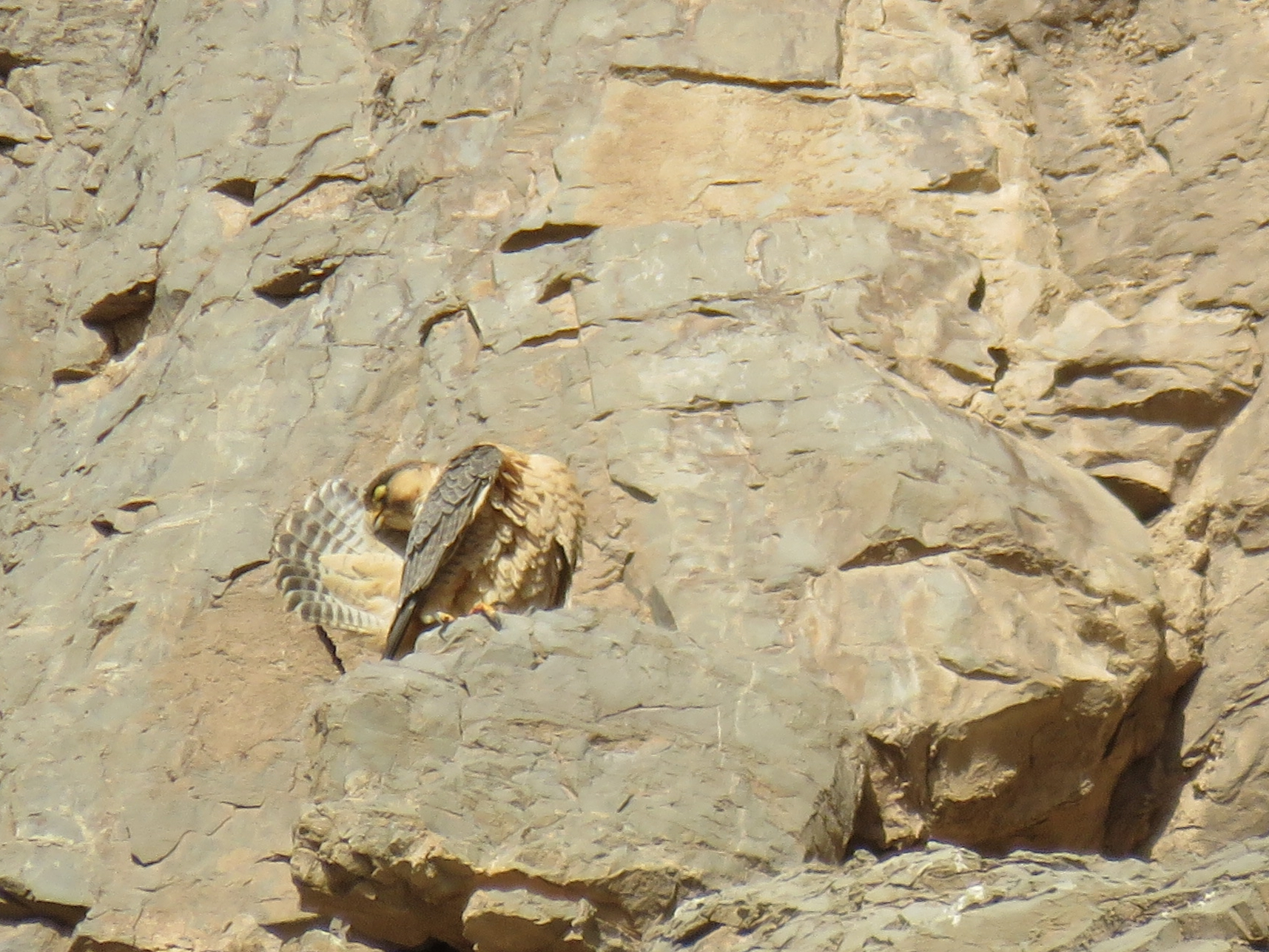
Male red-naped shaheen preening and showing tail feathers in Kerman
