= Fritz Berber =

Friedrich "Fritz" Berber (27 November 1898 in Marburg, Germany – 23 October 1984 in Kreuth, West Germany) was a member of the Nazi administration in Germany up until 1943, after which he worked, on secondment, for International Red Cross in Geneva.

Before World War II, Berber studied at Woodbrooke College, a Quaker study center in Birmingham, England.

Fritz Berber joined the Nazi Party in 1937. He was also a member of the National Socialist German Lecturers League and the National Socialist Association of Legal Professionals.

He was denounced by members of the Nazi party as a liberal, but was protected by Joachim Von Ribbentrop, who valued his knowledge of Great Britain. After the war, he became professor of International Law at the Ludwig-Maximilians-Universität München.
