= The Barbarians (painting) =

Painting by Max Ernst

- Artist: Max Ernst
- Year: 1937
- Medium: Oil on cardboard
- Movement: Surrealism
- Dimensions: 24.1 cm × 33 cm (9.5 in × 13 in)
- Location: Metropolitan Museum of Art; New York, NY
- Accession: 1999.363.21

The Barbarians (French: Les Barbares) is a 1937 painting by German surrealist painter Max Ernst.

== Description ==
From The Hartford Courant:

"Max Ernst's 1937 "The Barbarians" shows a bird-creature with a half-human, half-something. Are they battling? Commiserating? Whichever, they tower over the human below them."

Ernst's Surrealist paintings are steeped in Freudian metaphor, private mythology, and childhood memories. One of his major themes centered on the image of the bird, which often incorporated human elements. Although some of these birds look benign, their mere presence appears to be ominous. He first coupled birds and windblown, apocalyptic animals in a series of small works entitled The Horde (1927), and he resumed the theme in 1935 in a series of even smaller paintings called The Barbarians, to which the present one belongs. In his biography of the artist, John Russell identified these creatures as expressions of Ernst's fearful anticipation of the impending devastation in Europe during World War II. In this small painting, a gigantic, malevolent-looking bird couple marches forward with seemingly mile-long strides. The dark female leads the way as her male companion turns to look at the strange animal-perhaps their offspring-clinging to his left arm. In the far distance, a tiny woman holds onto some undefined winged being. The strange patterns on the bodies of the main figures, which evoke fossils or geological formations, are the result of grattage (scraping). In this technique, the artist coated the canvas, or in this case, a piece of cardboard, with layers of paint and while it was still wet pressed it against objects that left imprints on the surface. Afterward, he used a brush to touch up the forms thus created, or scraped away layers of pigment.
