= Pirates of the Barbary Coast =

1986 video game

- Developer: StarSoft Development Laboratories
- Publishers: StarSoft Development Laboratories; Keypunch Software; Cascade Games
- Platforms: Atari 8-bit, Atari ST, Commodore 64, MS-DOS
- Release: 1986: Atari 8-bit, ST, C64; 1987: MS-DOS
- Genres: Business simulation, strategy

Pirates of the Barbary Coast is a maritime trading and strategy video game set in the days of the Barbary corsairs, published in 1986 for Atari 8-bit computers, Atari ST, and Commodore 64 by StarSoft Development Laboratories. In 1987, it was also published by Keypunch Software for IBM PC compatibles, while Cascade Games published versions for the other platforms in Europe.

== Plot ==
The player takes on the role of the captain of the merchant ship American Star in 1798. During a stopover in Casablanca, when the captain goes ashore, the ship is attacked by the pirate Bloodthroat, who kidnaps the player's daughter Katherine and demands a ransom in gold within thirty days. The player must raise the sum by trading along the Mediterranean and Atlantic coasts of the Barbary States and fighting other pirates. Bloodthroat's hideout is on an unknown island, and the player will have to find clues to its location in order to eventually pay the ransom or face him in battle.

== Gameplay ==
Atari 8-bit screenshot

Pirates of the Barbary Coast interface is menu-driven, controlled with a pointer. The general map shows seven ports in North Africa and some islands in the Atlantic. Navigation to the selected destination is automatic and takes a number of in-game days. The condition of the ship and crew must be taken into account and food must be constantly maintained.

At each port, it is possible to buy and sell goods (wool, silk, rum, tobacco, etc.) for prices that vary with location and time. The actual price can be haggled, but if the player pushes too hard, the local merchant may get impatient and refuse to make a deal. In addition, the player can commission repairs, stock up on ammunition and food, and buy information.

While sailing from one port to another, the player's ship may be attacked by pirates, leading to a real-time action sequence. The enemy ship slowly passes in front of the player's 15 cannons, shown one at a time from behind. In order to fire, it is first necessary to select the elements in the correct sequence with the pointer and perform the following loading operations: inserting and pressing powder, inserting ball and brushing barrel. The player must then choose a cannon and adjust the elevation. If the opponent is defeated, there is a choice between seizing its gold or the captain's log, which contains information.

== Reception ==
Pirates of the Barbary Coast received mixed reviews. Your Commodore reviewer praised the large, colorful graphics, but complained that the game was slow to play and a bit difficult to control. Zzap!64 review summed up the game as a noble attempt at a budget disk game, unfortunately let down by the lack of depth and variety.
