= Socialism or Barbarism =

Socialism or Barbarism may refer to:

- Socialism or Barbarism: From the "American Century" to the Crossroads, a 2001 book by Hungarian Marxist philosopher and economist István Mészáros
- Socialisme ou Barbarie, a French Radical Left group that existed between 1948 and 1967
- Socialismo e Barbarie, a 1987 Italian punk rock album
- Socialism or Barbarism (Rosa Luxemburg), Rosa Luxemburg's use of the terms in 1916
