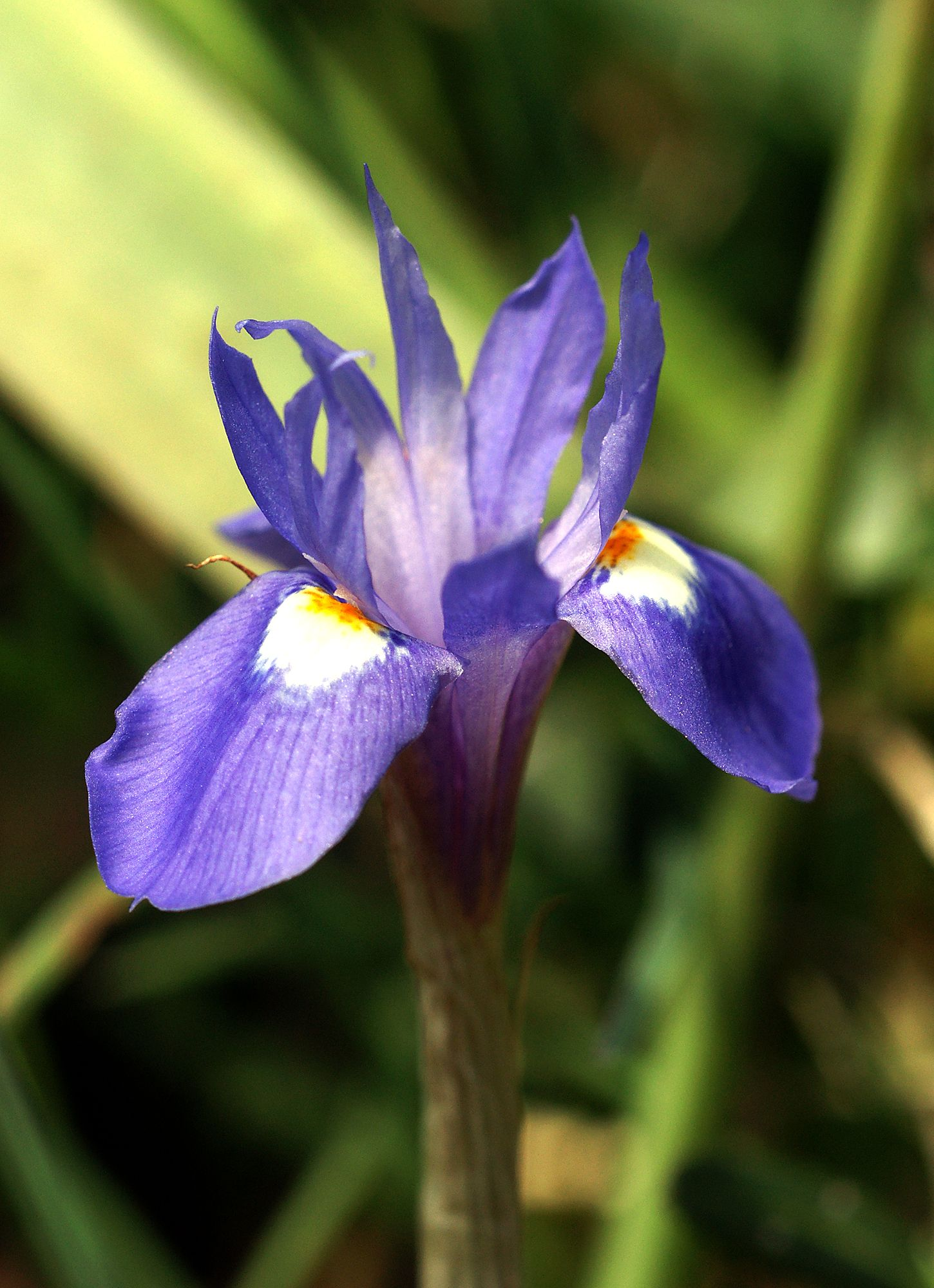

Scientific classification
- Kingdom: Plantae
- Clade: Tracheophytes
- Clade: Angiosperms
- Clade: Monocots
- Order: Asparagales
- Family: Iridaceae
- Genus: Moraea
- Species: M. sisyrinchium

Binomial name
- Moraea sisyrinchium Ker Gawl. (1805)

Synonyms
- Gynandriris sisyrinchium

= Moraea sisyrinchium =

Species of flowering plant

Moraea sisyrinchium, commonly the Barbary nut, is a species of flowering plant that belongs to the tribe Irideae. It is native to southern Europe and the Mediterranean region.
