= Jitendra Nath Gohain =

Indian surgeon

Jitendra Nath Gohain (d. 1 October 2018) was an Indian surgeon. He was the president of the Association of Rural Surgeons of India, and the Indian Medical Association (IMA) Nagaon branch. He also was a member of the Indian Association of Gastrointestinal Endosurgeons.

In 1981, he established the P & K Memorial Nursing Home at Nagaon. In 2006, he was awarded the Chikitsa Ratna Award.

Born in Nagaon, he completed his MBBS at Assam Medical College, Dibrugarh, and went to London for his residency. There he worked with British medical doctors like orthopaedist Alan Graham Apley. In 1971, he became a Fellow of the Royal College of Surgeons and returned to Assam to serve the society.

In 2007, his biography Jeebonjoyi Dr. Jitendra Nath Gohain: Tyaag aaru Adarkha, was written by journalist Khekhab Gogoi, which remains unpublished.

He died at the age of 85 at Ayursundra Hospital, Guwahati.
