= Barbari (surname) =

Barbari is a surname. Like its variant Barbary, it refers to the Berber inhabitants of North Africa. Nerrida Newbigin argued in 2002 that there is a close relationship between barbari and the Italian barbero or barberesco. The latter word is a derivation of the Italian for Berber horse (barbero) meaning a racehorse.

Notable people with the surname include:

- Adil Barbari (born 1993), Algerian racing cyclist
- Hammad al-Barbari, Abbasid general and governor
- Jacopo de' Barbari, Italian painter and printmaker
- Yusra Al Barbari (1923–2009), Palestinian teacher and activist
