= Chak Barbaria =

- Census Town
- Location in West Bengal, India Chak Barbaria (India)
- Coordinates: 22.737176°N 88.474803°E
- Country: India
- State: West Bengal
- District: North 24 Parganas

Area
  - Total: 0.54 km^{2} (0.21 sq mi)

Population (2011)
  - Total: 8,088
  - Density: 15,000/km^{2} (39,000/sq mi)

Languages
  - Official: Bengali, English
- Time zone: UTC+5:30 (IST)
- PIN: 700126
- Telephone code: +91 33
- Vehicle registration: WB
- Lok Sabha constituency: Barasat
- Website: north24parganas.nic.in

Chak Barbaria is a census town in the Barasat I CD block in the Barasat Sadar subdivision in the North 24 Parganas district in the Indian state of West Bengal.

== Geography ==
Cities, towns and locations in Barasat subdivision, North 24 Parganas
M: municipal town, CT: census town, R: rural/ urban centre, H: historical centre
Owing to space constraints in the small map, the actual locations in a larger map may vary slightly

=== Location ===
Chak Barbaria is located at 22.737176°N 88.474803°E.

Chak Barbaria, Kokapur, Barbaria, Berunanpukuria and Jagannathpur form a loose cluster of villages and census towns along State Highway 2 (locally known as Barasat-Barrackpore Road), close to Barasat.

Duttapukur police station has jurisdiction over Barasat I CD Block.

=== Area overview ===
The area covered in the map alongside is largely a part of the north Bidyadhari Plain. located in the lower Ganges Delta. The country is flat. It is a little raised above flood level and the highest ground borders the river channels.54.67% of the people of the densely populated area lives in the urban areas and 45.33% lives in the rural areas.

Note: The map alongside presents some of the notable locations in the subdivision. All places marked in the map are linked in the larger full screen map.

== Demographics ==
As of 2011 India census, Chak Barbaria had a population of 8,088; of this, 4,085 are male, 4,003female. It has an average literacy rate of 73.4%, lower than the national average of 74.04%.

== Infrastructure ==
As per District Census Handbook 2011, Chak Barbaria covered an area of 0.5436 km^{2}. It had 1 primary school, the nearest middle school, secondary school and senior secondary school were 2 km away at Barasat. Chak Barbaria had a hospital with 10 beds.

== Transport ==
Local roads link Chak Barbaria to both National Highway 12 (old number NH 34) and State Highway 2 (locally known as Barasat-Barrackpore Road).

The nearest railway station is Barasat Junction railway station on the Sealdah-Bangaon line.

== Healthcare ==
North 24 Parganas district has been identified as one of the areas where ground water is affected by arsenic contamination.
