= Battle of the Barbary Coast =

- Part of the Anglo–Spanish War
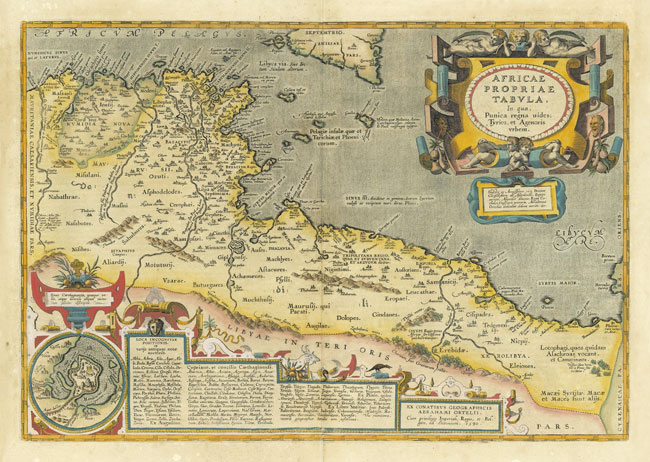
- Map of Barbary Coast in 1590
Date	26 July 1592
Location	Off the Barbary Coast (Alboran Sea)
Result	English victory

Belligerents
England	Spain

Commanders and leaders
Thomas White	Unknown

Strength
1 Merchant galleon	1 galleon 1 Flyboat

Casualties and losses
15 killed or wounded	1 Galleon captured 1 Flyboat captured 213 killed, wounded or captured

The Battle of the Barbary Coast was a minor naval engagement that took place off in the Barbary Coast not far from the Gibraltar Strait, on July 26, 1592 during the Anglo-Spanish War. The hard fought action by an English merchant galleon in the Amity of London captained by Thomas White resulted in the capture of two Spanish ships which included a galleon despite them being outnumbered four to one. The prizes were heavily laden with quicksilver and a large amount of very important Papal bulls bound for the West Indies.

== Background ==
On July 25 the powerfully armed 100 ton armed merchant galleon Amity of London under Captain Thomas White left the Barbary coast and headed back to England. The owners of the Amity were Simon Lawrence, Nicholas Stile and Henry Colthurst - all connected by marriage, and worked regularly in partnership from their base in London. They were generally known as Henry Colthurst and Company which mainly dealt trade with the Northern African Barbary coast merchants.

After successfully completing their trade they were to go through the Gibraltar Strait and were alert whilst they sailed in the Alboran Sea. On the morning of July 26 in the latitude of 36 degrees, Captain White got sight of two ships at a distance of three or four leagues. Giving immediate chase, he came within gun-shot of them by 7pm; and by seeing the Spanish colours, he soon realized they were larger ships of war, with potential laden of merchandise. Opposing the English was the Spanish galleon St. Peter and a large flyboat of war the St. Francisco.

== Battle ==
The Spanish also spotted the pursuing ships and immediately placed themselves in order of battle, a cables length before the other. The Amity which constituted of forty two men and a boys fired as they approached and soon the Spanish returned fired too.

The Spanish galleon St Peter took many hits but put up stout resistance - White then attempted to board her, and laid alongside after about an hour of fighting. Just before he did he fired his ordnance and small shot at her inflicting as much damage as possible. At the same time, the other vessel St. Francisco, having thought that the English had boarded her consort with all their men, then bore down on the Amity. The St. Francisco intended to have laid alongside so as to entrap the Amity between both ships and fire off broadsides. Perceiving this intention, White fitted his ordnance so as to quit the galleon so that she boarded the St. Francisco instead and soon both Spanish ships managed to fall away from Amity.

White hoisted his Mainsails, and weathered both ships, came close aboard the St. Francisco, to which he gave his whole broadside, from which several of her crew were killed. After this he tacked about, rearmed all guns, came round again upon both ships, ordered them to yield or he would sink them outright. St. Francisco which had been holed below the waterline, would have complied, but the captain of the St. Peter forced him to recall his surrender. White called out, that if he also did not presently yield, he would sink him first. Intimidated by this threat, they both hung out white flags and yielded; yet refused to strike their own sails, as they had sworn not to strike to any Englishman.

The fighting had lasted a total of five hours and only after the battle had finished did the English realise they had been outnumbered 2:1.

== Aftermath ==
Amity only lost around fifteen casualties of which two were killed. In the five hours of fighting Amity received thirty two shots in her hull, masts, and sails but damage had only been moderate, and they were able to effect repairs and sail on without hindrance.

White took the two prizes back to England and sailed them up the River Thames to London amid much rejoicing. The Spanish prisoners by their own confession afterwards made themselves so sure of taking the English ship, that they debated among themselves whether it were better for them to carry White's ship back into Sanlúcar de Barrameda or Lisbon.

The Spanish vessels had been laden with fourteen hundred chests of quicksilver (mercury), a hundred tons of wine and an immense haul of papal bulls. Also captured were at least 500 iron muskets and arquebuses. Prize money was high too; over £700,000 worth which was shared with the crew and the owners and a large share to Queen Elizabeth I. King Philip II with the loss of mercury which was used to extract silver from the lucrative mines in New Spain was deprived of £600,000 the amount of what he would have received in proportion. The Bulls which the English had also seized were commodities useless to themselves, but the losses to Philip became excessive. They had cost him 300,000 Florins and would have been sold for 5,000,000.
