= Craig Barbary =

Australian rules footballer

Personal information
- Full name: Craig Barbary
- Born: 11 July 1960 (age 66)
- Original team: Woomelang
- Height: 173 cm (5 ft 8 in)
- Weight: 77 kg (170 lb)

Playing career^{1}
Years	Club	Games (Goals)
1979	Essendon	8 (5)
- ^{1} Playing statistics correct to the end of 1979.

Craig Barbary (born 11 July 1960) is a former Australian rules footballer who played with Essendon in the Victorian Football League (VFL).
