= Hoyt Hotel =

Former hotel in Portland, Oregon, U.S.

Coordinates: 45.52732°N 122.676714°W

- Hoyt Hotel circa 1970

- Location within Portland, Oregon

General information
- Location: Portland, Oregon
- Opening: 1912
- Closed: August 2, 1972
- Demolished: 1977
- Owner: Harvey Dick (1941–1972)

Other information
- Number of rooms: 175
- Number of restaurants: 1, Barbary Coast Lounge
- Number of bars: 1, Roaring 20s Room

The Hoyt Hotel was a 175-room hotel located in Portland, Oregon. Harvey Dick purchased the hotel in 1941. In 1962, he renovated the hotel and added the Barbary Coast Lounge and Roaring 20s Room, a nightclub that attracted celebrities such as Johnny Carson, Duke Ellington, and Anne Francis. Dick closed the hotel in 1972 due to declining business.

== History ==
The hotel was built in 1912 at the southwest corner of Hoyt and 6th Street, directly facing Portland's Union Station.

Harvey Dick, part-owner of Columbia Steel, purchased the Hoyt Hotel in 1941 primarily as housing for war-time steel workers. In 1962, he renovated the hotel and added the Barbary Coast Lounge and Roaring 20s Room, a nightclub that attracted celebrities such as Johnny Carson, Duke Ellington, and Anne Francis.

Dick closed the hotel on August 2, 1972, after several years of declining business; the Roaring 20s Room closed three weeks earlier. The building was demolished in 1977, the same year as Harvey Dick's death.

As of 2014 the block which the hotel occupied is a fenced, gravel-covered empty lot sometimes used for construction staging, and is contaminated.

== Description ==
Walter Cole, the Portland resident and female impersonator better known as Darcelle XV, recalled the Roaring 20s Room in Sharon Knorr's book, Just Call Me Darcelle. According to Darcelle, the ladies' restroom had a full-time harpist; the men's restroom included a 12-foot (3.7 m) long trough urinal decorated like a rock grotto, featuring miniature forest animals that served as targets. Darcelle recalled, "[There was also a] life-sized replica of Fidel Castro... If a gentleman could hit that open mouth, lights would flash, sirens would go off and a huge waterfall would flush the entire urinal."

== In popular culture ==
Harvey Dick bought a replica of a locomotive from the movie studio 20th Century Fox and used it for the décor of the Barbary Coast Lounge.

The replica was later used to film scenes in and around the locomotive in the television series Petticoat Junction in exchange for a prominent screen credit at the end of each episode: "Train furnished by Barbary Coast, Hoyt Hotel, Portland, Oregon."
