= Yolande Berbers =

Belgian computer scientist

Yolande Berbers is a Belgian computer scientist whose interests include software engineering, middleware, distributed systems, ubiquitous computing, model-driven architecture, and context awareness. She is a professor of computer science at KU Leuven, vice-dean of the KU Leuven Faculty of Engineering, and president of the Leuven Center on Information and Communication Technology.

Berbers became a member of the Royal Flemish Academy of Belgium for Science and the Arts in 2014. She was elected president of the European Society for Engineering Education (SEFI) in 2019.
