= Barbaria (village) =

- Town
- Location in West Bengal, India Barbaria (India)
- Coordinates: 22.748176°N 88.456803°E
- Country: India
- State: West Bengal
- District: North 24 Parganas

Population (2024)
  - Total: 100,890
- Demonym: Barbarians

Languages
  - Official: Bengali, English
- Time zone: UTC+5:30 (IST)
- PIN: 700126 (Barbaria)
- Telephone/STD code: +91 33
- Lok Sabha constituency: Bangaon
- Vidhan Sabha constituency: Swarupnagar
- Website: north24parganas.nic.in

Barbaria is a town in the Barasat I CD block in the Barasat Sadar subdivision of the North 24 Parganas district in the state of West Bengal, India.

== Geography ==
Cities, towns and locations in Barasat subdivision, North 24 Parganas
M: municipal town, CT: census town, R: rural/ urban centre, H: historical centre
Owing to space constraints in the small map, the actual locations in a larger map may vary slightly

=== Location ===
Barbaria is located at 22.748176°N 88.456803°E.

Barbaria, Berunanpukuria, Jagannathpur, Kokapur and Chak Barbaria form a loose cluster of villages and census towns along State Highway 2 (locally known as Barasat-Barrackpore Road), close to Barasat.

=== Area overview ===
The area covered in the map alongside is largely a part of the north Bidyadhari Plain. located in the lower Ganges Delta. The country is flat. It is a little raised above flood level and the highest ground borders the river channels. 54.67% of the people of the densely populated area lives in the urban areas and 45.33% lives in the rural areas.

Note: The map alongside presents some of the notable locations in the subdivision. All places marked in the map are linked in the larger full screen map.

== Demographics ==
According to the 2011 Census of India, Barbaria had a total population of 4,764, of which 2,416 (51%) were males and 2,348 (49%) were females. Population in the age range 0–6 years was 454. The total number of literate persons in Barbaria was 3,649 (84.66% of the population over 6 years).

== Transport ==
Barbaria is on State Highway 2 (locally known as Barasat-Barrackpore Road.

The nearest railway station is Barasat Junction railway station on the Sealdah-Bangaon line.

== Education ==
Adamas Institute of Technology was established at Barbaria, PO Jagannathpur, in 2008–2009.

Adamas World School is a co-educational CBSE Board school at Adamas Knowledge City, PO Jagannathpur, having arrangements for teaching from Play class to class X.
