= Barbari (AMC Area) =

- city
- Location in Assam, India Barbari (AMC Area) (India)
- Coordinates: 27.4000°N 94.8667°E
- Country: India
- State: Assam
- District: Dibrugarh

Population (2001)
  - Total: 5,282

Languages
  - Official: Assamese
- Time zone: UTC+5:30 (IST)
- Vehicle registration: AS

Barbari (AMC Area) is a census town part of Dibrugarh.

== Demographics ==
As of 2001 India census, Barbari (AMC Area) had a population of 5282. Males constitute 63% of the population and females 37%. Barbari (AMC Area) has an average literacy rate of 80%, higher than the national average of 59.5%; with 66% of the males and 34% of females literate. 11% of the population is under 6 years of age.
