= Jeetendra Ghadge =

Indian activist

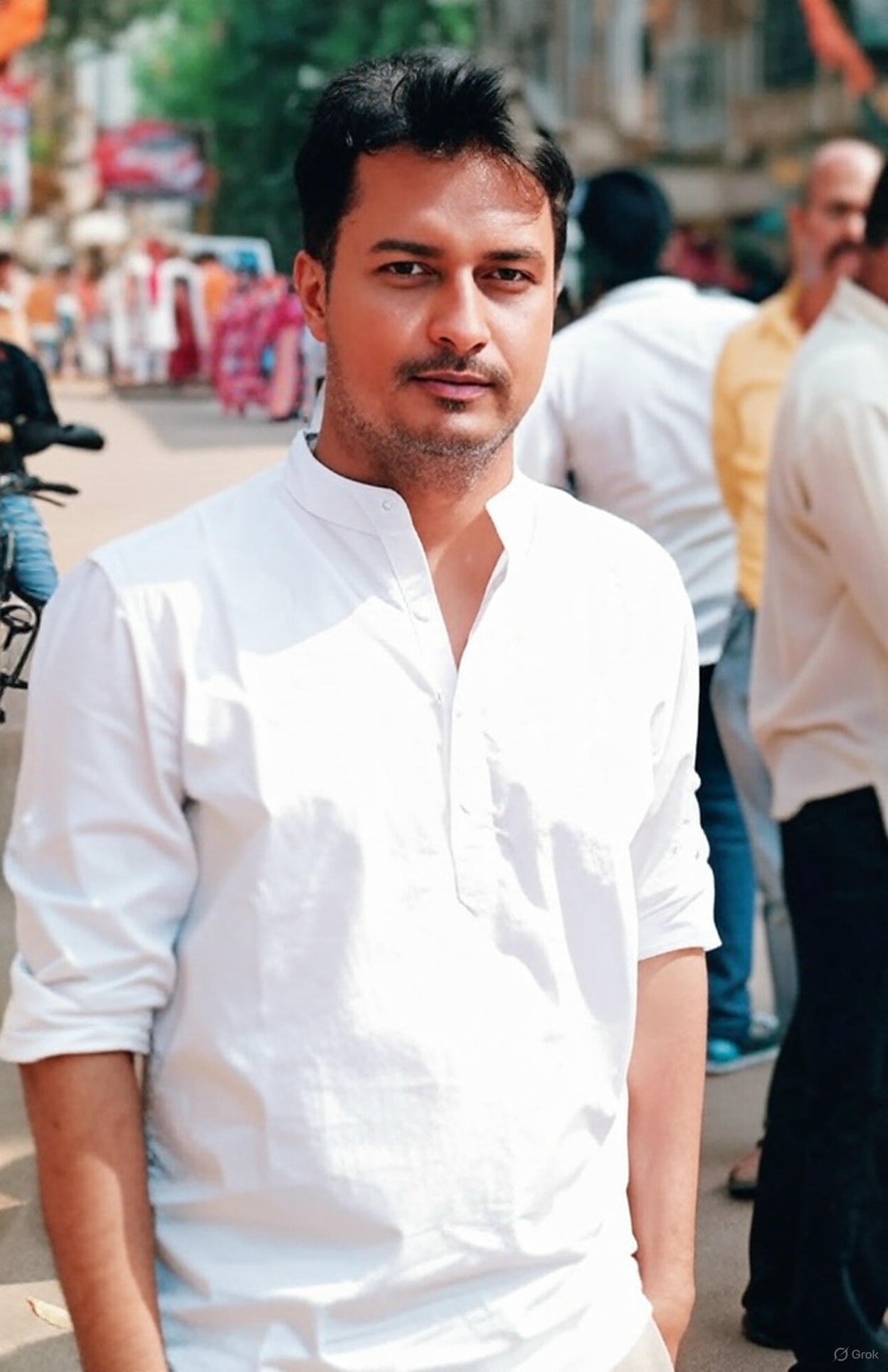
- Jeetendra Ghadge in 2008
- Born: Pune, Maharashtra, India
- Occupation: Activist

Jeetendra Ghadge is an Indian activist based in Girgaon, Mumbai. Instrumental in exposing a police-politician nexus and working towards implementing police reforms. A full-time whistleblower Ghadge has also uncovered poor performance in controlling corruption by Anti-Corruption Bureau, Mumbai. As a RTI activist his work on uncovering alleged corruption in dam construction has led, according to the Times of India, to harassment of Ghadge.

== Early life ==
Born in Pune district Jeetendra Ghadge was brought up in Mumbai city by his mother Usha Ghadge and father Vasant Ghadge. Ghadge also exposed the plight of farmers in Maharashtra's villages, nearly half of the farmers in Maharashtra who have committed suicide over the last four years were denied a paltry Rs 1 lakh compensation. Taking notice of this news publish all over India National Human Rights Commission took suo-moto cognizance and issued a notice to the Maharashtra Government. In effort to control the crises Maharashtra Government announced framing of new rules and increased the compensation to 5 lakhs rupees.
