= Jishnu Barua =

Indian civil servant

Jishnu Barua IAS
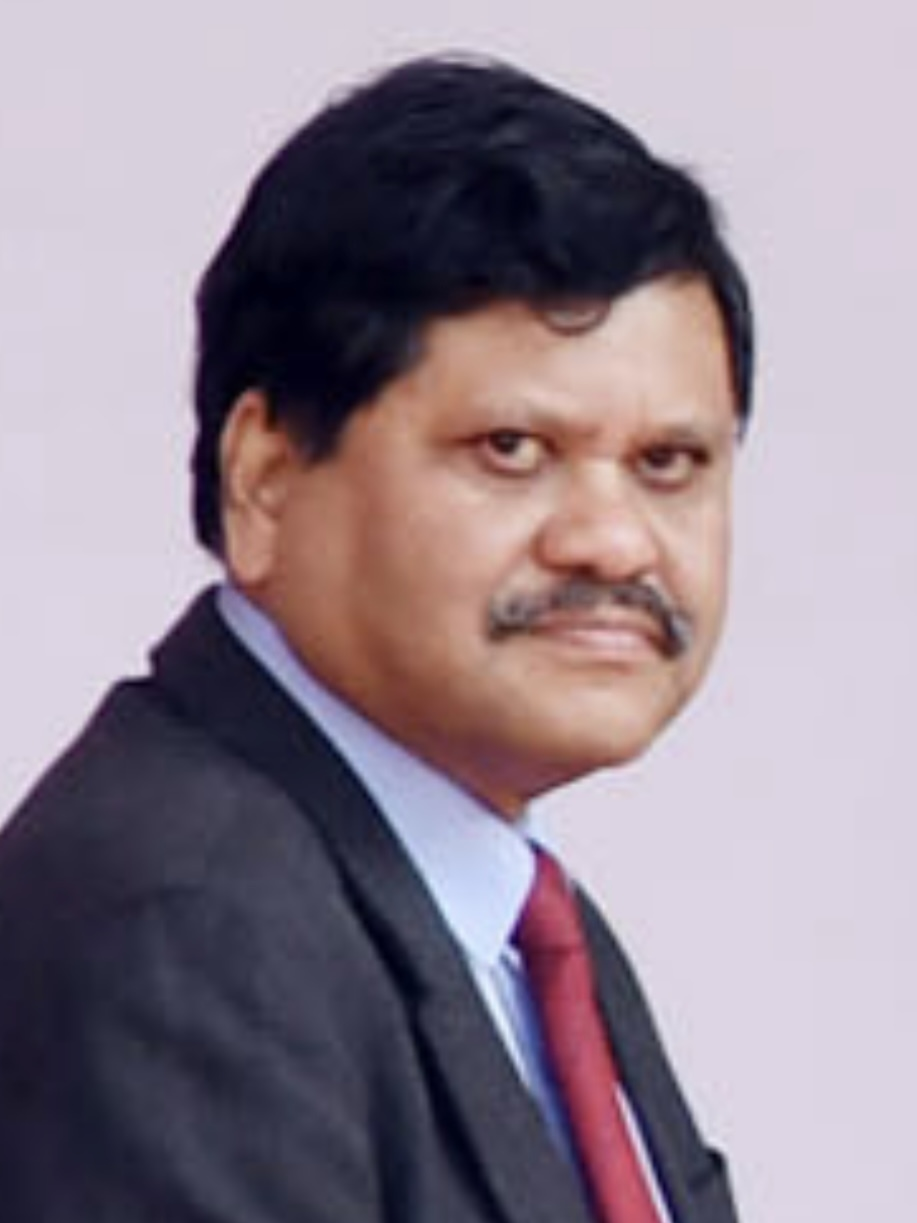
- Barua in 2017

6th Chairperson of the Central Electricity Regulatory Commission
- Incumbent
- Assumed office 2 March 2023
- Appointed by: Ministry of Power
- Preceded by: P. K Pujari

49th Chief Secretary of Assam
- In office 31 October 2020 – 31 August 2022
- Chief Minister: Sarbananda Sonowal; Himanta Biswa Sarma
- Preceded by: Kumar Sanjay Krishna
- Succeeded by: Paban Kumar Borthakur
Further offices held
Additional Chief Secretary
Government of Assam
In office
2017 – October 2020
Principal Secretary to the Power Department
In office
2017
Joint Secretary
Department of Personnel and Training
In office
August 2014 – 2017
Managing Director
Assam Industrial Development Corporation
In office
1997 – 2001
Deputy commissioner of Jorhat
In office
27 May 1996 – 18 June 1997
Deputy commissioner of North Cachar Hills
In office
1994 – 1995

Personal details
- Born: 1 September 1962 (age 64)
- Spouse: Rashmi Barua
- Children: 2
- Parents: Dwijendra Nath Barua (father); Prativa Barua (mother)
- Relatives: Paul Barua (brother); Chandra Narayan Singha (great-grandfather)
- Education: St. Stephen's College, Delhi (BA) (MA); National Defence College (MPhil)
- Occupation: Civil servant; historian

Jishnu Barua (born 1 September 1962) is an Indian civil servant and historian serving as the 6th Chairperson of the Central Electricity Regulatory Commission since 2023. He previously served as the 49th Chief Secretary of Assam from October 2020 to August 2022. In a career spanning over three decades, Barua has held various positions in the Assam state government and Indian national government.

Barua is the son of former Chief Secretary of Manipur Dwijendra Nath Barua and of author Prativa Barua. Through his mother, he is a descendant of the Ahom dynasty as the great-grandson of Chandra Narayan Singha, who was the great-nephew of the last Ahom King Purandar Singha. Barua studied at St. Stephen's College, Delhi where he earned a Bachelor of Arts in philosophy and a Master of Arts in history. He became an Indian Administrative Service (IAS) officer of the Assam-Meghalaya cadre in 1988. Barua served as the deputy commissioner (DC) of the North Cachar Hills from 1994 to 1995 and then as the DC of Jorhat from 1996 to 1997. He moved to work in central deputation in 2001 as private secretary to Minister Satyabrata Mookherjee, and then served as the director of police in the Ministry of Home Affairs until 2006. He then earned a Master of Philosophy in Defence and Strategic Studies from the National Defence College before returning to the Assam state government as Commissioner and secretary to the Chief Minister, Tarun Gogoi. In 2009, he was given the additional charge of home and political affairs, before becoming Principal Secretary to Chief Minister Gogoi and the Borders Area Department.

In 2014, Barua returned to central deputation as Joint Secretary in the Department of Personnel and Training, serving until 2017. He then returned to the Assam government as Principal Secretary to the Power Department, before being promoted to Additional Chief Secretary. He then served as Additional Chief Secretary in various departments, lastly in the Home and Political and Revenue and Disaster Management Departments from January to October 2020.

In October 2020, Barua was appointed the 49th Chief Secretary of Assam, succeeding Kumar Sanjay Krishna. As Chief Secretary and chairman of the Assam State Disaster Management Authority (ASDMA), he oversaw the Assam government's response to the COVID-19 pandemic. He was also Chief Secretary during the 2020 Bodoland Territorial Council election and the 2021 Assam Legislative Assembly elections. His tenure also encompassed several border disputes between Assam and states; in July 2021 he signed an agreement in the Assam-Nagaland dispute and reached an agreement in the Assam-Mizoram dispute. He retired as Chief Secretary in August 2022, and was appointed the Chairperson of the CERC in February 2023. (Note: Barua was appointed Chair of the CERC on 27 February 2023, but was sworn-in on 2 March.)

== Early life and education ==
=== Ancestry and family ===
Jishnu Barua was born on 1 September 1962, the son of Dwijendra Nath Barua (1931–1996) and Prativa Barua. His father, Dwijendra, was a civil servant who served as the Chief Secretary of Manipur from 1981 to 1987 and later as Chairman of the Assam Public Service Commission from 1989 to 1993. His mother, Prativa Barua, is a descendant of the Ahom dynasty and author; her works include a travelogue Neel Sagaror Upokulot Ahezar Din (2001), a compilation of articles Nishar Sadhu (2003), an essay collection Jatra (2012), and her novel Jiwan Juddhar Setu (2021). Prativa is the granddaughter of Chandra Narayan Singha, the great-nephew of the last Ahom King Purandar Singha.

His younger brother, Paul Barua, is also a civil servant served as the deputy commissioner of Dima Hasao and later of Charaideo. His paternal uncle, Bhupendra Nath Baruah, was the first director of Sports and Youth Welfare in Assam.

=== Education ===
Barua studied at St. Stephen's College, Delhi where he earned a Bachelor of Arts in philosophy and a Master of Arts in history.

== Civil service career (1988–2020) ==
=== Early career ===
Barua became an Indian Administrative Service (IAS) officer of the Assam-Meghalaya cadre in 1988. He went on to serve as a Sub-Divisional Officer (SDO) of Abhayapuri (Civil) in the Bongaigaon district of Assam.

From 1994 to 1995, Barua served as the deputy commissioner (DC) of the North Cachar Hills. He then served as the DC of Jorhat from 27 May 1996 to 18 June 1997. Barua then was the managing director of Assam Industrial Development Corporation (AIDC) from 1997 to 2001.

=== National government and studies ===
From 2001 to 2006, Barua served in central deputation. He served as Private Secretary to Satyabrata Mookherjee who was the Union Minister of State for Commerce & Industry and Minister of State for Atomic Energy and Minister of State for Space until 2004. He later served as Director (police) in the Ministry of Home Affairs until 2006.

In 2006, Barua earned a Master of Philosophy in Defence and Strategic Studies from the National Defence College.

=== Return to state government ===
==== Commissioner ====
After returning to the Assam state government, Barua served as Commissioner and secretary to the Chief Minister, Tarun Gogoi. On 9 September 2009, he was given the additional charge of home and political affairs. As Home Commissioner under Gogoi, Barua took up an incident where the Nagaland Police had attacked All Assam Students' Union (AASU) activists with his Nagaland counterpart, and was dispatched by Gogoi to oversee the security situation there. He also signed a memorandum of settlement in New Delhi to upgrade the Karbi Anglong Autonomous Council, an agreement that had been formalised after seven years of dialogue. In September 2011, Barua for the Assam government signed a tripartite agreement for the suspension of operations of the United Liberation Front of Asom (ULFA) along with ULFA and the Indian government.

==== Principal Secretary ====
Barua later served as Principal Secretary to Chief Minister Tarun Gogoi and the Borders Area Department. In the role, he attended meetings including on implementing the National Food Security Act in 2013, and improvements in the power sector under Gogoi, and was present for the release of the white paper on foreigners by Gogoi in October 2012.

==== Role in the Assam state archives ====
During his tenure as Principal Secretary to the Chief Minister, Barua acted as the coordinator for the establishment of the Assam state Archives. A group of local historians approached the Chief Minister's office in 2012 to discuss the state of the archives, and Barua then began to managed the situation. At the time, the files were not catalogued properly and the building was in disrepair. Barua managed the archival development project and led the archives team in updating the catalogue. Renovation and modernisation of the archives began in May 2013.

In 2013, he revealed that 306,643 files from between 1774 and 1957, around 29,300 books and reports, and 2,419 maps had been preserved through modern scientific methods. He stated to The Telegraph that the project had incurred ₹1.95 crore (US$200,000) during 2013–14. Barua helped secure funding and public interest in preserving archival history. He convinced Gogoi to visit the archives in 2014, organised exhibitions and delivered lectures to students on the archive to bring them to public attention.

=== Return to Central Deputation ===
In August 2014, Barua was appointed Joint Secretary in the Department of Personnel and Training in the Government of India. In April 2016, he was interviewed as a possible candidate to become Chairman of Oil India. He served as Joint Secretary until 2017. During his tenure in the position, he represented India at sixth session of the conference of the States Parties to the United Nations Convention against Corruption in St. Petersburg in November 2015.

=== Second return to state government ===
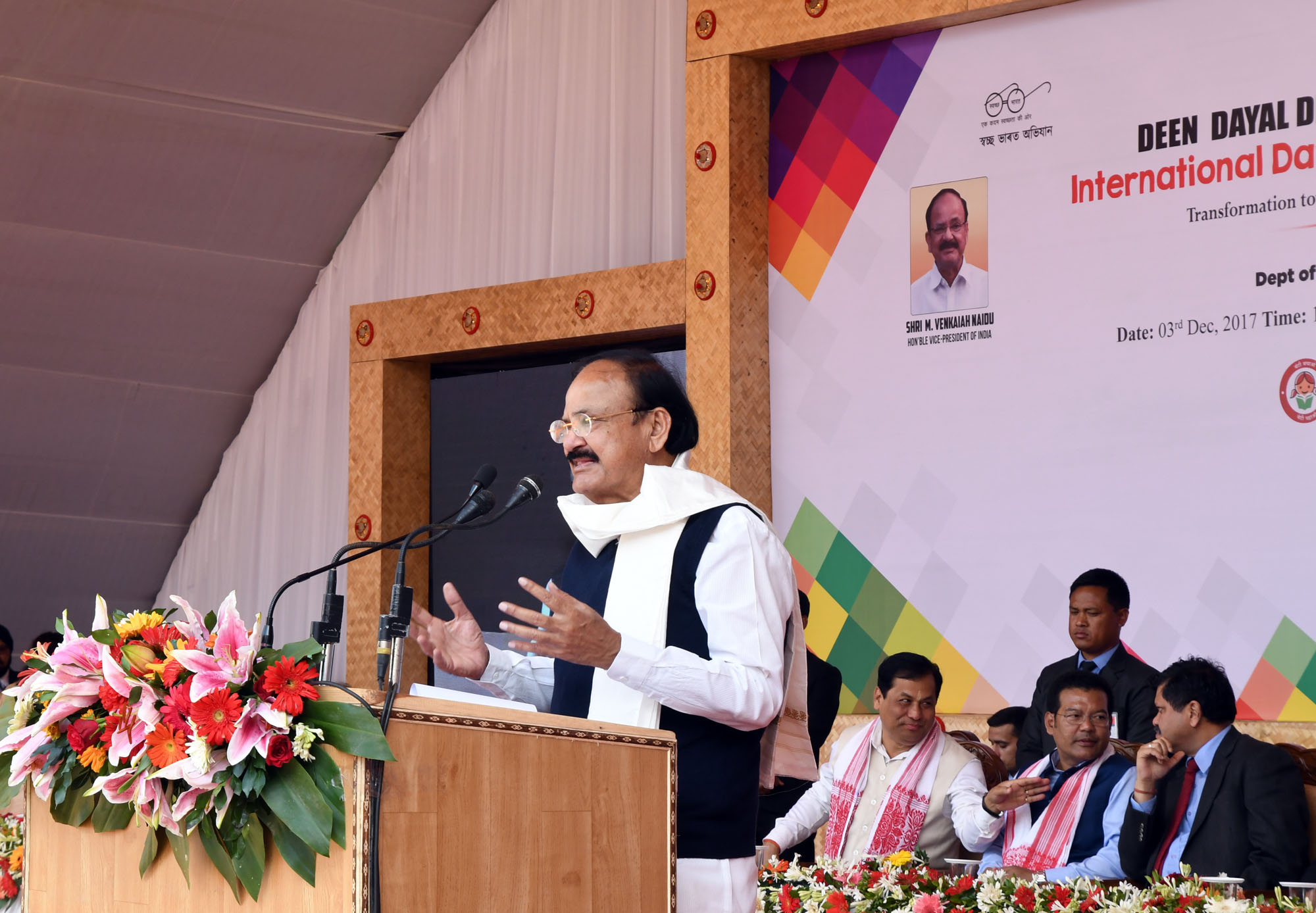
Barua (bottom right) with Chief Minister Sarbananda Sonowal and Minister Naba Kumar Doley while Vice President Venkaiah Naidu speaks on 3 December 2017.

After leaving his position as Joint Secretary, Barua returned to the Assam cadre as Principal Secretary to the Power Department in 2017. As Principal Secretary to the Power Department, Barua went on a 2-day tour to Bhutan with Minister Naba Kumar Doley, where they met the Minister of Economic Affairs of Bhutan and discussed where the two regions could cooperate on in the future. Chief Minister Sarbananda Sonowal asked Barua as Principal Secretary to lead the shaping of the Assam solar power policy on a fast track basis ahead of the next cabinet meeting in October 2017.

On 10 August 2017, he was appointed Chairman of the Assam Power Distribution Company Limited (APDCL), Assam Power Generation Corporation Limited (APGCL), and the Assam Electricity Grid Corporation Limited (AEGCL). During his tenure as APDCL chairman from 2017 to 2018, the APDCL recorded collection efficiency of over 100% for the first time in its history.

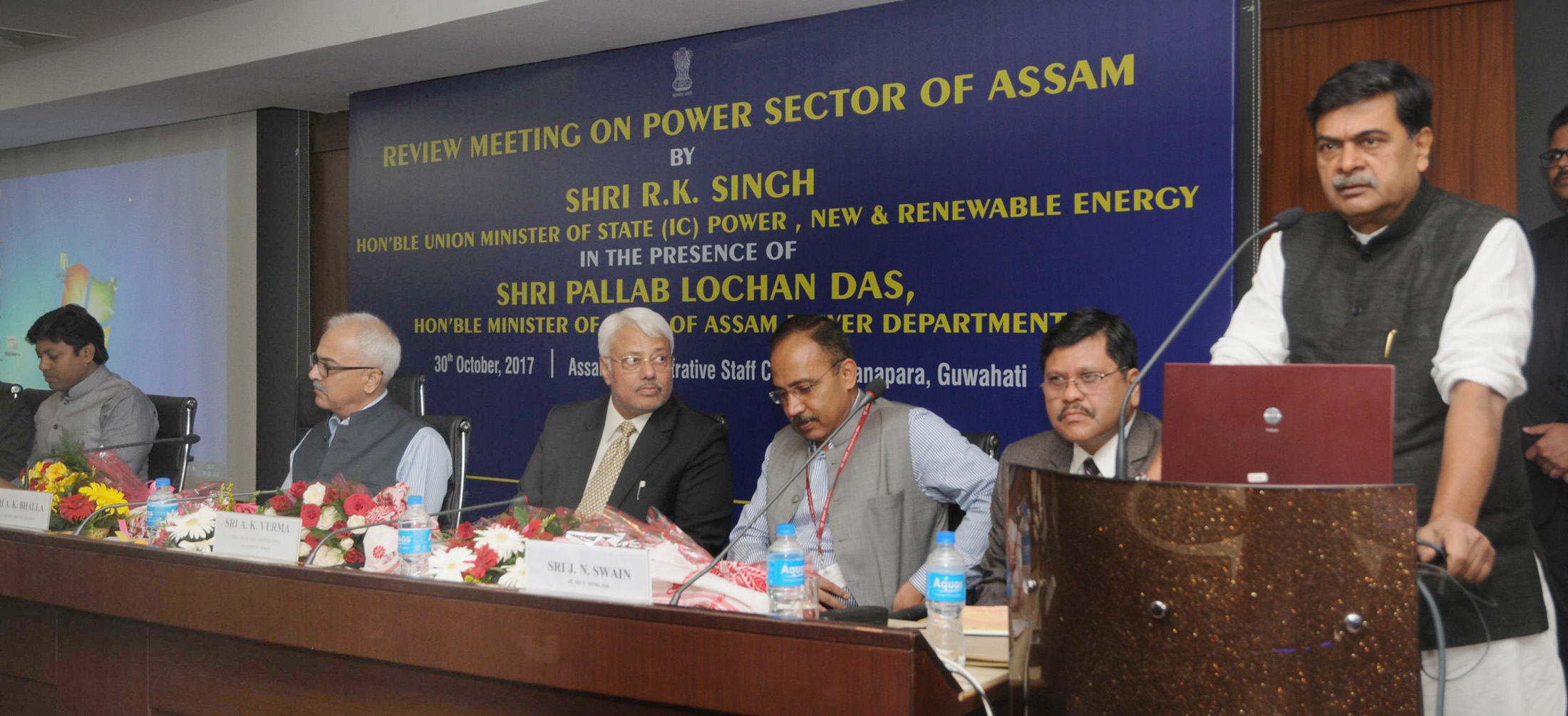
Barua (second from right) with R.K. Singh in October 2017.

In May 2018, he was promoted to Additional Chief Secretary for Power, Social Welfare, General Administration and Secretariat Administration. In October 2018, he was relieved from his additional charge as chairman of the APDCL, APGCL and AEGCL, and was posted as in addition to his current positions as Additional Chief Secretary for Labour Welfare and Tea Tribes Welfare. In September 2018, he was tasked with investigating an incident where a boat carrying 40 people capsized in the Brahmaputra river. He also participated in the felicitation ceremony for outgoing Chief Secretary T.Y. Das. In March 2019, Chief Minister Sarbananda Sonowal ordered Barua to conduct a one-person inquiry into the alleged irregularities in government appointments to the panchayat and rural development department. In May, the inquiry term was extended.

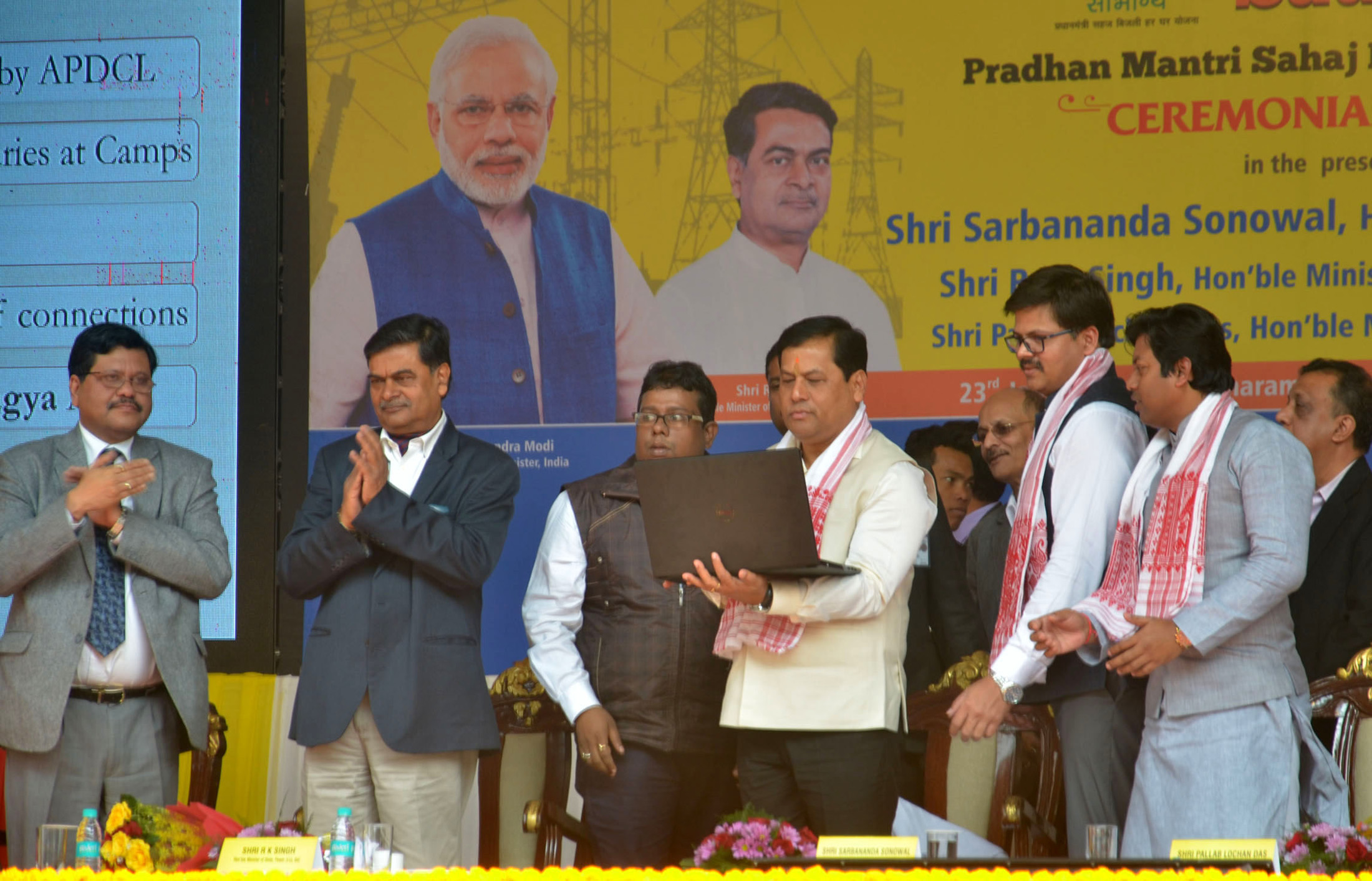
Barua (far left) with R.K. Singh, Sarbananda Sonowal and Pallab Lochan Das in January 2018.

As Additional Chief Secretary for the Environment, Barua's department approved a proposal to create an eco-sensitive zone around Kaziranga national park, and sent the proposal to the national government. As Additional Chief Secretary for Social Welfare, he stressed the importance of creating awareness of welfare schemes and the timely utilisation of funds in Hailakandi.

In December 2019, following the appointment of Kumar Sanjay Krishna as Chief Secretary, Barua was appointed to Krishna's former position as Additional Chief Secretary Home and Political and Revenue and Disaster Management Departments, with Barua retaining his position in the Secretariat Administration (Archives) Department. Barua was relieved from his additional charge as Additional Chief Secretary for the Environment and Forest and Excise Department. He was relieved from his Social Welfare brief in February 2020, and his Revenue Disaster Management and Secretariat Administration (Archives) portfolios were placed as additional charge.

In September 2020, Barua travelled to Nagaland with, along with Chief Secretary Krishna and Bhaskar Jyoti Mahanta and other officials, to discuss the inter-state border areas. In October, Barua met with his counterpart, along with Krishna and Mahanta, in Arunachal Pradesh following border dispute issues with Arunachal Pradesh and Assam.

== Chief Secretary (2020–2022) ==
=== Appointment ===
On 30 October 2020, Barua was appointed Chief Secretary of Assam, succeeding the outgoing Kumar Sanjay Krishna.

=== COVID-19 pandemic ===
Barua took office as Chief Secretary amidst the COVID-19 pandemic in India, and he also held the position of chairman of the state executive committee of the Assam State Disaster Management Authority (ASDMA), which managed the COVID guidelines in Assam. In December 2020, Barua issued new guidelines which restricted large gatherings in enclosed spaces with no social distancing to prevent further spread of COVID-19 ahead of the New Year celebrations, until 10 January 2021. On 13 January, Barua visited the National Informatics Centre in Assam where he reviewed projects there and appreciated the developing of a variety of applications by the NIC to help fight COVID-19. In February, Barua ordered more strict adherence to COVID protocols following a rise in the number of viral infections across certain parts of the state, and also directed administrations to impose section 144 of the Code of Criminal Procedure to enforce social distancing.

On 19 April, Barua attended a meeting with Chief Minister Sonowal, Health Minister Himanta Biswa Sarma and Director General of Police (DGP), Bhaskar Jyoti Mahanta which reviewed the COVID-19 situation in Assam. Later that month, Barua signed an order which imposed a night curfew from 8 pm to 5 am until 1 May. On 12 May, Barua issued an order which directed all offices, religious places, and weekly markets to remain closed for 15 days, and banned the movement of people from 2 pm to 5 am. Following the order, Barua stated in a press conference that a complete lockdown was "an option " but that they were going in a "gradually phased manner". On 25–26 May, Barua directed that the urban curfew was extended until 5 June and advanced the curfew in rural areas from 6 pm to 2pm. On 4 June, he issued an order which extended curfew restrictions until 15 June and increased curfew relaxation by an hour. On 16 June, he extended the restrictions until 22 June but eased some curbs in certain districts.

On 23 June, Barua issued an order which directed department heads to ascertain the vaccination status of frontline government workers before releasing monthly salaries. On 19 July, he announced that Assam issued a revised standard of procedure (SOP) which imposed a total curfew in Golaghat, Jorhat, Lakhimpur, Sonitpur and Biswanath and banned meetings and gatherings in open or closed spaces. On 9 August, he announced that the curfew timing was reduced further, and on 26 October Barua issued a new set of guidelines which eased restrictions following 31% of the population being fully vaccinated. In January 2022, following a surge in cases, he announced that Republic Day celebrations would be restricted.

=== 2021 Assam election ===
In March 2021, ahead of the 2021 Assam Legislative Assembly election, Barua reviewed the specific covid arrangements with the Election Commission of India, in a meeting chaired by Chief Commissioner Sunil Arora. In May, Barua swore in pro tem speaker, Phani Bhusaj Choudhury in the absence of Governor Jagdish Mukhi.

=== Border disputes ===
==== Assam-Nagaland ====
The Assam-Nagaland border dispute is the longest border dispute in Assam's history, beginning since Nagaland's creation in 1963. On 31 July 2021, in the presence of Nagaland Deputy Chief Minister Yanthungo Patton and Assam Education Minister Ranoj Pegu, Barua signed an agreement with his Nagaland counterpart to deescalate the border tensions between the two states by withdrawing their armed police officer forces from the disputed areas in the Dessoi Valley reserve forest area within 24 hours, The agreement came after a stand-off between the armed forces in Ao Senden village and Vikuto Village (as known in Nagaland)/Jankhona Nala Nagajankha and Compartment No. 12 (as known in Assam).

The agreement held that the states would instead monitor the disputed areas using UAVs or drones and satellite imagery to help maintain the status quo and avoid further escalation. Barua also stated that Jorhat and Mokokchang SPs would ensure the "orderly withdrawal of their respective forces", and that if there was a violation of the status noticed by the satellite imagery, both states would inform each other to take "corrective measures".

==== Assam-Mizoram ====
In November 2020, Barua along with DGP Mahanta reviewed the law and order situation in the Barak Valley; following the meeting Barua announced that centre forces would be sent to the Cachar and Karimganj districts. Barua also met the family of those who had died on the other side of the border, and stated a check of 5 lakh would be sent to their families. Barua later said to the media that peace was of "paramount importance" and that there was "no point" in "escalating tension" or "increasing our own problems". Later that month on 8 November, Barua met virtually with the Mizoram Chief Secretary, Lalnunmawia Chuaungo, and Union Home Secretary Ajay Kumar Bhalla to find solutions to the border issue. Mizoram alleged that Assam had installed blockades on the national highway to disrupt Mizoram, while Assam argued that government forces were not involved and it instead was locals terrorised by Mizoram forces who resorted to doing as such. Following the virtual meeting, the Assam government escorted 21 trucks to Mizoram. Barua stated that the boundaries of Assam were sacrosanct, and that in order to change the boundaries, one must approach parliament with "appropriate provisions under the constitution of India."

Clashes on the border had taken place in August 2020 and February 2021. Following further tensions, on 9 July 2021 Barua and Lalnunmawia Chuaungo met with Bhalla at Gujarat Bhavan. The Assam delegation proposed maintenance of the pre-clash status quo and withdrawal of security forces from the border, but the Mizoram government refused to sign any agreement and sought further time. Hours after the meeting, a grenade was triggered on Mizoram territory where Assam officials were visiting.

On 26 July 2021, tensions escalated between the two states following an exchange of fire between the two police forces which resulted in deaths of seven people, including six Assam police personnel, and sixty injured. On 28 July, Barua attended a meeting with Mizoram counterparts chaired by Bhalla following the violence. Following the meeting, Barua stated that both states agreed for the deployment of neutral CAPF in the border area along the national highway 306. In an interview with Rediff on 31 July, Barua stated that nobody expected the Mizoram state police to attack in this manner.

=== Other activities and roles ===
In December 2020, Barua administered the oath of office to members of the Bodoland Territorial Council (BTC) following the election. Two days later, Chief Minister Sonowal asked Barua to take steps to help fill up vacancies in positions.

Barua attended the swearing-in ceremony of Chief Justice Sudhanshu Dhulia in January 2021, and the ceremony of his successor Rashmin Manharbhai Chhaya in June 2022.

Following the resignation of VK Pipersania in June 2021, Barua returned to his previous positions of Chairman of the APDCL, APGCL and the AEGCL as an additional charge. In June 2022, he was relieved of his additional charge of AEGCL chairman.

=== Retirement ===
Barua retired as Chief Secretary on 31 August 2022, but an order earlier that month stated that he would continue as the APDCL Chairman for a period of two years. On the day of his retirement, Chief Minister Himanta Biswa Sarma, Education Minister Ranoj Pegu and other officials visited Barua at his office in the Assam secretariat to pay tribute to him.

== CERC Chair (2023–present) ==
=== Appointment ===
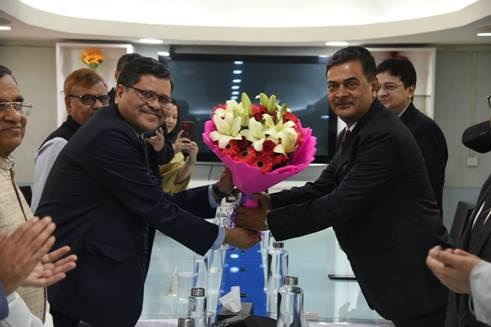
R.K. Singh administering the oath of office to Barua on 2 March 2023.

On 27 February 2023, Barua was appointed Chairperson of the Central Electricity Regulatory Commission. He was administered the oath of office by R.K. Singh on 2 March.

=== Tenure ===
During Barua's tenure, a new CERC office was established at the World Trade Centre in March 2024.

In July 2025, Barua as part of a four-member bench issued a suo motu order which started the phased process for implementing market coupling. The commission directed the Grid controller of India to build software and run a three-month trial of a unified pricing system for the term-ahead electricity market, and report back to the commission on how it worked.

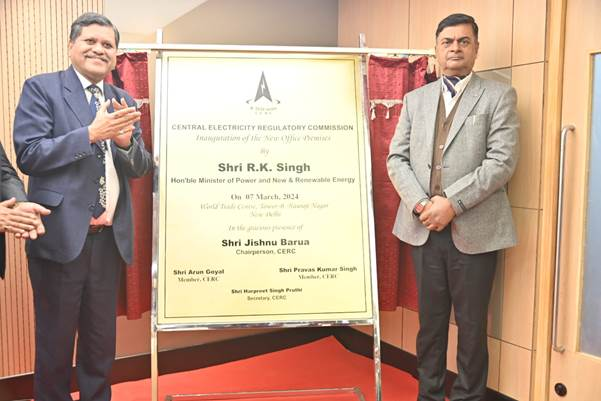
Barua and Singh at the new CERC office on 7 March 2024.

In November 2025, Barua presided over a decision which directed that a dispute between Renew Wind Energy and the Solar Energy Corporation of India (SECI) be resolved through arbitration. The commission ruled that the dispute over contract interpretation could not be decided by a regulatory commission.

In a case heard before Barua in December 2025, the CERC rejected a petition that sought compensation due to a government order, with the commission ruling that the Ministry of Power order did not constitute a change in law, and therefore did not justify the requested compensation.

In January 2026, IIT Delhi, the CERC and Grid controller of India established a centre for excellence for regulatory affairs in the power sector. At the inaugural event, Barua said that the centre would help deepen regulatory research and also strengthen evidence-based policymaking in the power industry.

== Personal life ==
Barua is married to Rashmi Barua. They have two children: a daughter Tanvi and a son Chaitanya.

Barua is fond of reading, both fiction and non-fiction books. He is also a cricket fan and enjoys travelling. He was awarded a Master of Philosophy by the University of Madras for his thesis at NDC.

== Views ==
In a 2024 interview with PowerLine, Barua argued that the power sector was "poised for substantial growth in the coming decade" and noted that expansion of renewable energy "shifted the business outlook" in India.
