= Kumar Kaibarta Gaon =

- city
- Location in Assam, India Kumar Kaibarta Gaon (India)
- Coordinates: 26.75°N 94.2167°E
- Country: India
- State: Assam
- District: Jorhat

Population (2001)
  - Total: 6,345

Languages
  - Official: Assamese
- Time zone: UTC+5:30 (IST)
- Vehicle registration: AS

Kumar Kaibarta Gaon is a census town in Jorhat district in the Indian state of Assam.

== Demographics ==
As of 2001 India census, Kumar Kaibarta Gaon had a population of 6345. Males constitute 53% of the population and females 47%. Kumar Kaibarta Gaon has an average literacy rate of 81%, higher than the national average of 59.5%: male literacy is 86%, and female literacy is 76%. In Kumar Kaibarta Gaon, 8% of the population is under 6 years of age.
