= Charingia Gaon =

- census town
- Country: India
- State: Assam
- District: Jorhat

Population (2011)
  - Total: 5,094

Languages
  - Official: Assamese
- Time zone: UTC+5:30 (IST)

Charingia Gaon is a census town located in the Jorhat district, in the northeastern state of Assam, India.
