= Naubaisa Gaon =

Nawboisha Gaon
- city
- Location in Assam, India Nawboisha Gaon (India)
- Coordinates: 26.75°N 94.2167°E
- Country: India
- State: Assam
- District: Jorhat

Population (2001)
  - Total: 5,042

Languages
  - Official: Assamese
- Time zone: UTC+5:30 (IST)
- Vehicle registration: AS

Naubaisa Gaon is a census town in Jorhat district in the Indian state of Assam.

== Demographics ==
As of 2001 India census, Naubaisa Gaon had a population of 5042. Males constitute 51% of the population and females 49%. Naubaisa Gaon has an average literacy rate of 81%, higher than the national average of 59.5%: male literacy is 88%, and female literacy is 74%. In Naubaisa Gaon, 8% of the population is under 6 years of age.
