= Senchoa Gaon =

- city
- Location in Assam, India Senchoa Gaon (India)
- Coordinates: 26°43′56.46″N 94°11′10.55″E
- Country: India
- State: Assam
- District: Jorhat

Population (2001)
  - Total: 7,366

Languages
  - Official: Assamese
- Time zone: UTC+5:30 (IST)
- Vehicle registration: AS

Senchoa Gaon is a census town in Jorhat district in the Indian state of Assam.

== Demographics ==
As of 2001 India census, Senchoa Gaon had a population of 7366. Males constitute 54% of the population and females 46%. Senchoa Gaon has an average literacy rate of 82%, higher than the national average of 59.5%: male literacy is 82%, and female literacy is 81%. In Senchoa Gaon, 10% of the population is under 6 years of age.
