= Jorhat district =

Coordinates: 26.75°N 94.2167°E

- District of Assam
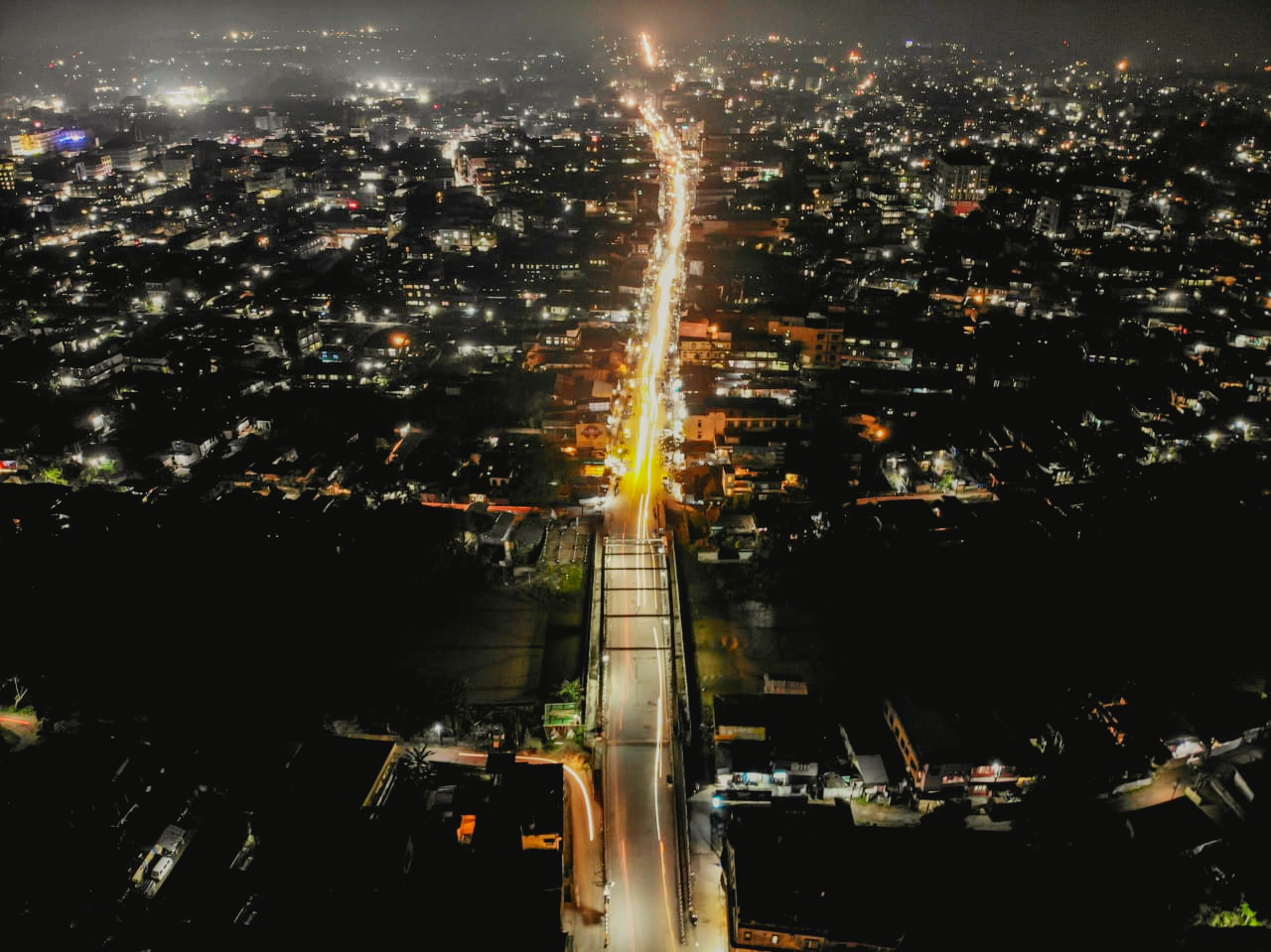
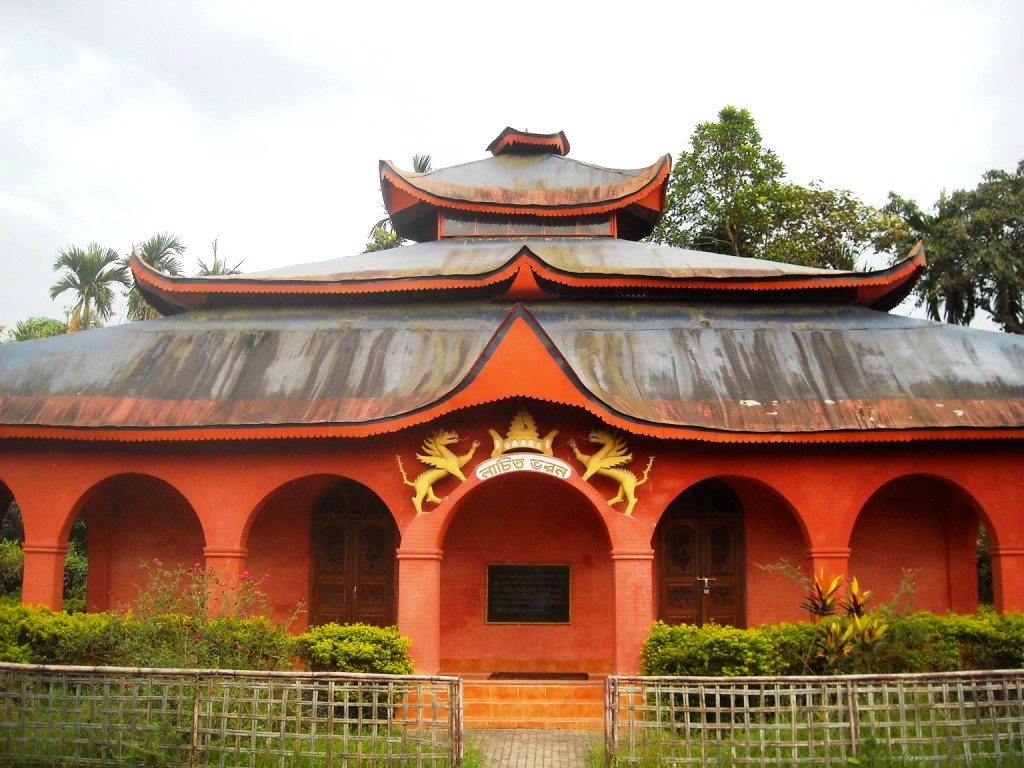
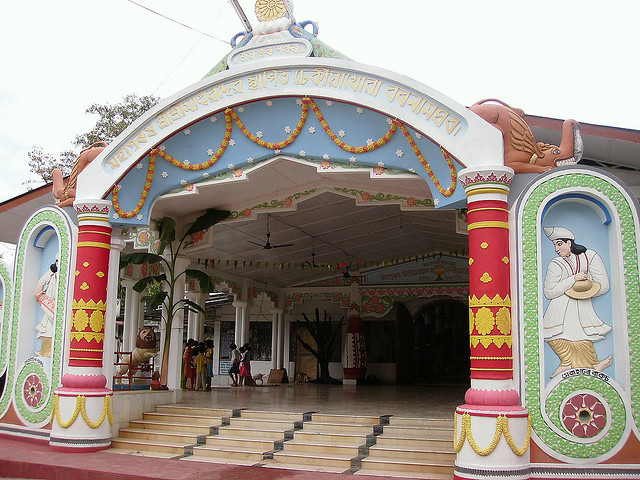
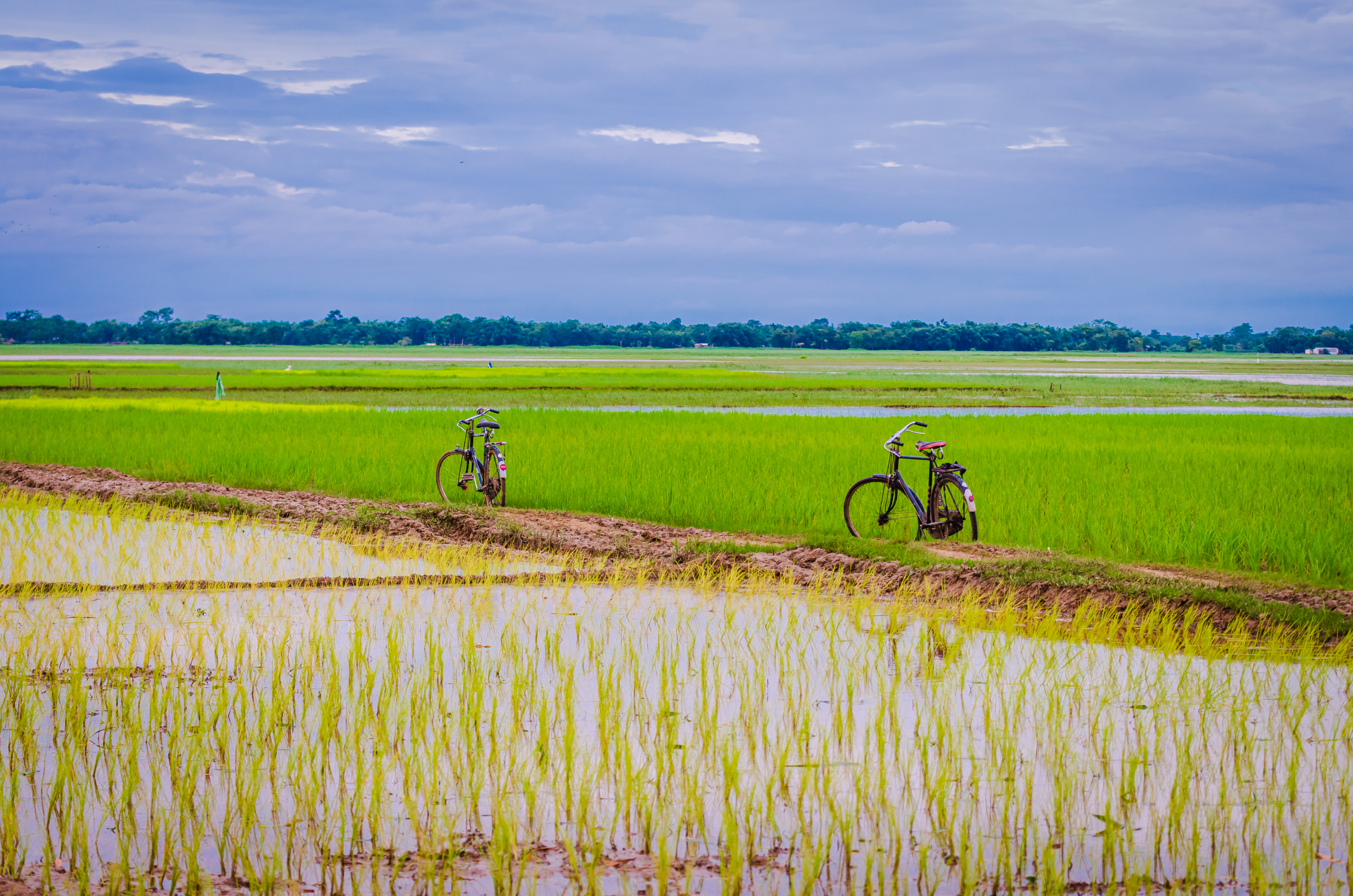
- From top, left-to-right: Jorhat aerial view, Lachit Bhawan at Lachit maidam, Dhekiakhowa Bornamghar, a paddy field in Jorhat
- Interactive map of Jorhat district
- Country: India
- State: Assam
- Division: Upper Assam
- Headquarters: Jorhat
- Tehsils: 1. Jorhat East 2. Jorhat West 3. Titabor 4. Teok 5. Mariani

Government
  - Lok Sabha constituency: Jorhat
  - Vidhan Sabha constituencies: Jorhat, Titabar, Mariani, Teok

Area
  - Total: 2,852 km^{2} (1,101 sq mi)

Population (2011)
  - Total: 924,952
  - Density: 324.3/km^{2} (840.0/sq mi)

Demographics
  - Literacy: 83.42 %
  - Sex ratio: 956 females per 1000 males
- Time zone: UTC+05:30 (IST)
- Vehicle registration: AS-03
- Major highways: NH-37
- Website: jorhat.assam.gov.in

Jorhat district (/ˈdʒɔːˌhɑːt/ or /ˈdʒɔːrˌhɑːt/) is an administrative district of the Indian state of Assam situated in the central part of the Brahmaputra Valley. The district is bounded by Majuli on north, Nagaland state on the south, Sivasagar on the east and Golaghat on the west. On the north of the district, the river Brahmaputra forms the largest riverine island of the world. The administrative seat is at Jorhat city.

Jorhat was previously a sub-division of undivided Sibsagar district. In 1983, Jorhat was carved out of Sibsagar District and was made a separate district.

== Etymology ==
Jorhat or Jorehaut means tween hats (Bazar) or mandis - Macharhat and Chowkihat which existed on the two different banks of the river Bhogdoi during the 18th century.

== History ==
=== 16th century ===
Most of the district was part of the Kachari Kingdom until the beginning of the 16th century. Dergaon, located south of Jorhat district, was an important Kachari province, which was annexed by Ahoms, along with the rest of the present-day district, in the early 16th century. Some minor parts of the present district, which were earlier located north of the Dihing River, were part of the Chutia Kingdom before the Ahom-Chutia war in the 16th century, a few years prior to the Kachari wars. In 1794, the Ahom king Gaurinath Singha shifted the capital from Sibsagar (erstwhile "Rangpur") to Jorhat. This town was a flourishing commercial metropolis but was destroyed after a series of Burmese invasions from 1817 till the arrival of the British force in 1824 under the Stewardship of David Scott and Captain Richard.

The British rule, though, was not free from rebellions and revolutions, which contributed to the reemergence of this historical town. From the very first decade of British rule, the great revolutionaries who emerged were Gomdhar Konwar, Jeuram and Piyali. The British system of administration came into vogue in 1839 with an established Police Thana. During the great Sepoy Mutiny, the anti-British plot hatched by Maniram Dewan and Piyali Barua was sabotaged. These leaders were hanged in public at this very place in 1858.

In 1885, a narrow-gauge train service (Jorehaut Provincial Railway) came into operation and ultimately became instrumental in the rapid growth of the tea industry.

Though the civil sub-division under Sibsagar district at Jorhat was formed in 1869, this place was declared as administration headquarters of the undivided Sibsagar district in 1911, which comprised the present Sibsagar, Jorhat and Golaghat and parts of Karbi-Anglong district, with Major A. Playfair as the first deputy commissioner.

The modern-day district of Jorhat was created in 1983 when it was split from Sibsagar district.

== Geography ==
On the north of the district, the river Brahmaputra forms the largest riverine island of the world, Majuli, spreading over 924.6 km^{2}. with a population of about 1.50 lakh being threatened by the constant erosion by this mighty, unstable river. Majuli had been the principal place of pilgrimage of Vaishnavites since the ages of the Ahom rules. There are several Satras resembling medieval monasteries headed by Satradhikars preaching and teaching the Vaishnavism which was initiated by Sankardeva (1449–1568). Each Satra has unknown wealth of Vaishnav scriptures and extensive revenue free lands being cultivated by the "Bhakats" of the Satras.

Jorhat district occupies an area of 2,859 square kilometres (1,104 sq mi), comparatively equivalent to Russia's Zemlya Georga. Floods frequent the island every year without exception. The mean annual rainfall of the district is 2029 mm.

== District administration ==
The District Administration is headed by Deputy Commissioner Jay Shivani, IAS. is the Superintendent of Police of Jorhat district and belongs to the IPS batch of 2011 (Assam-Meghalaya cadre).

The only outlying civil subdivision is Titabor. Titabor subdivisional administration is headed by SDO (Civil) Ayush Garg, IAS.

=== Divisions ===
There are five Assam Legislative Assembly constituencies in this district: Jorhat, Teok, Mariani, Titabor and Dergaon. Dergaon is designated for scheduled castes. Dergaon is in the Kaliabor Lok Sabha constituency. The other four are in the Jorhat Lok Sabha constituency.

=== Towns and villages ===
- Senchoa Gaon

== Economy ==
=== Agriculture ===
There are about 135 tea gardens, including out gardens, and the predominant field crop is rice, with per capita food grain production of 205 kg per annum.

=== Manufacturing industry ===
The district has a number of small-scale and cottage industries in the field of cane work and bamboo work, silver jewellery, furniture making, brass smithing, umbrella making, soap manufacturing, packaged food manufacturing, etc. Types of industries present in Jorhat are agro based, cotton textile, woolen, silk and artificial thread based clothes, ready-made garments and embroidery, wood/wooden based furniture, chemical/chemical based, rubber, plastic and petro based, metal based (steel fab.), repairing and servicing, etc.

=== Tourism ===
Jorhat facilitates as the base location to reach out to many interesting places of international importance located at close proximity such as Majuli, Kaziranga National Park, Sivasagar, Gibbon Wildlife Sanctuary, the famous Molai forest, forested single handed, Dhekiakhowa Bornamghar, etc. Examples of numerous attractions that can be visited within the district are Lachit Borphukan's Maidam, Raja Maidam, Jorhat Science Centre & Planetarium, Jorhat Gymkhana Club, Chandrakanta Handique Bhavan, Jorhat District Museum, Thengal Manor, Sukapha Samannay Kshetra, Kaziranga Golf Resort, Shanti Ashram, Jagannath Temple, Thengal Cultural Centre & Museum, public parks, multiple tea gardens, Sukapha Park, Gabhoru Parbat and many more.

== Demographics ==
According to the 2011 census Jorhat district has a population of 1,092,256, roughly equal to the nation of Cyprus or the US state of Rhode Island. This gives it a ranking of 418th in India (out of a total of 640). The district has a population density of 383 inhabitants per square kilometre (990/sq mi) . Its population growth rate over the decade 2001-2011 was 9.21%. Jorhat has a sex ratio of 956 females for every 1000 males, and a literacy rate of 83.42%.

The divided district has a population of 924,952, of which 220,534 (23.84%) live in urban areas. Jorhat has a sex ratio of 963 females per 1000 males. Scheduled Castes and Scheduled Tribes are 64,787 (7.00%) and 62,368 (6.74%) of the population respectively.

Main Assamese communities in the district are Tea tribes (Adivasi), Ahom, Chutia, Sonowal Kacharis, Thengal Kachari.

=== Religion ===
Religions in Jorhat district (2011)
Religion	Percent
Hinduism	91.09%
Islam	5.85%
Christianity	2.25%
Other or not stated	0.81%

Hindus are 842,520 (91.09%) of the population. Muslims are 54,092 (5.85%) and Christians are 20,796 (2.25%) of the population.

=== Languages ===
Languages of Jorhat district (2011)
1. Assamese (88.7%)
2. Bengali (3.77%)
3. Hindi (3.04%)
4. Mising (1.63%)
5. Others (2.91%)

At the time of the 2011 census, 88.65% of the population spoke Assamese, 3.77% Bengali, 3.04% Hindi and 1.63% Mising as their first language.

== Culture ==
The cultural diversities which prevailed in Jorhat nearly a century ago has inspired the people to participate in cultural activities through the decades and as a result Jorhat has been able to produce many creative writers, musician, actors, historians and journalists, terming Jorhat The Cultural Capital of Assam.

Festivals

Tea festivals

The Tea Festival is held in the district of Jorhat in the northeastern state of Assam in India. Jorhat is well known for its extensive tea gardens, and is the nerve centre of the tea industry. Jorhat has the world famous Tocklai Experimental Centre. In this place research work is carried out to find new varieties of tea and also the curative effects of green tea. The island of Majuli, the largest island on the Brahmaputra, and the Nambar Forest Reserve can be visited from Jorhat. In Majuli there are numerous monasteries and the Nambar Forest Reserve is famous for being a regenerating hot spring.

Description of Tea Festival

The Tea Festival in Jorhat celebrates tea, music and gaiety. The Tea Festival in Jorhat brings about a world of festivity with a warm and traditional cordial reception. The celebrations of the Festival of Tea in Jorhat include visit to the tea gardens, playing golf, safaris into the jungles, tasting food items, shopping, and cultural entertainment. The adventure sports on offer include angling and rafting in turbulent rivers. Along with the beauty and cultural diversity of Assam, tourists can also meet the warm hearted people of Assam.

Majuli festivals

The northeastern state of Assam in India is famous for Majuli, the largest river island in the world, earlier a part of the district administration of Jorhat. The island of Majuli is positioned in the middle of river Brahmaputra and is the abode to the place of Vaishnavite culture in Majuli. The total area of Majuli has been diminishing gradually due to strong erosion of the river Brahmaputra. The Majuli Festival provides lot of opportunities to fit oneself into the festival. During the Majuli Festival in Assam, special events like cultural programs and exhibitions are organized.

Description of Majuli Festival

The Assam Majuli Festival is held on the bank of river Luit, the location of which has an immeasurably beautiful and picturesque milieu. The river Luit is just 1.5 kilometers from the sub-divisional headquarter of Majuli Island, Garamur. The Festival of Majuli in Majuli in Assam conducts many cultural programs with the cultural troupes of Majuli as well as troupes from the rest of the country. In the exhibition, Assamese products are on display, which are specially prepared and designed by artists that draw attention to the traditional grandeur of Majuli. The organizers also arrange for a food festival in the Majuli Festival in Assam, where Assamese and tribal dishes are also made obtainable. Seminars are also organized to have a discussion on different topics. A display of various artwork and culturally driven masks can be seen in different museums located in the island.

At the Majuli Festival in Majuli, Assam, various ethnic groups gather while maintaining their respective cultural traditions. The island of Majuli serves as an environment for various migratory bird species.

Time of Celebration of Majuli Festival

The Assam Majuli Festival is presumably held during the winter season, in the month of November. This arrangement is made keeping in mind the climate conditions and the road communicating facilities in Majuli.

== Historical religious places ==
- Dhekiakhowa Bornamghar
- Burhi Gosani Devalaya
- Borbheti Than
- Garakhia Dol
- Moinaporia Namghar
- Buddha Vihar, Jorhat

== Notable personalities ==
Jorhat has produced many creative writers, historians, journalists and many more.

- Birendra Kumar Bhattacharya, the first Assamese to win India's highest literature award, the Jnanpith Award
- Jadav Payeng, the 'Forest man of India'
- Krishna Kanta Handique, ideologist and educationist, former vice chancellor of Gauhati University
- Hiren Bhattacharyya, Assamese poet
- Tarun Gogoi, former chief minister of Assam
- Zubeen Garg, musician
- Chandra Narayan Singha, member of Assam Legislative Council
- Munin Barkotoki, Writer

== Flora and fauna ==
In 1997 Jorhat district became home to the Gibbon Wildlife Sanctuary, which has an area of 21 km^{2} (8.1 mi^{2}), is a protected area which is home to hoolock gibbons.

There is another forest called Mulai Kathoni or Molai Forest, a man-made forest covering 550 hectares of area on a Brahmaputra River sandbar located near Kokilamukh area. It is named after Jadav Payeng, Indian environmental activist and forestry worker.

Molai forest and Payeng have been the subject of a number of documentaries. A locally made film documentary, produced by Jitu Kalita in 2012 The Molai Forest, was screened at the Jawaharlal Nehru University. Jitu Kalita, who lives near Payeng's house, has also featured and given recognition on his reporting of the life of Payeng through his documentary. Molai forest was also featured in a 2013 documentary Foresting life, directed by the Indian documentary filmmaker Aarti Shrivastava, and in William Douglas McMaster's 2013 film documentary Forest Man. People have pledged US$8,327 on the Kickstarter campaign for the post-production of this documentary in early 2013, which was shown at 2014 Cannes Film Festival.

About 100 km from Jorhat lies the internationally recognized Kaziranga National Park.

== Education ==
Jorhat is considered one of the best locations for modern education in the state. The city of Jorhat has one of the highest number of educational institutions in the region. The literacy rate of the district of Jorhat is next to Kamrup Metropolitan.

The Jorhat Government Boys School was established in 1883 with facilities for science teaching. The Jagannath Barooah University is a higher educational institute in the district (set up in 1930) and the first college in Upper Assam. Multiple schools and colleges were established later. Jorhat has a history of educational institutions. Some schools in the district include Balya Niketon Kakojan, Balya Bhavan, Don Bosco Higher Secondary School, Baghchung, Army Public School Jorhat, Air Force School, Carmel Convent School, Hemalata Handiqui Memorial Institute, Don Bosco High School Lichubari, Jyoti Vidyapith Teok, Assam Rifle's Public School, Delhi Public School, Spring Dale High School, Maharishi Vidya Mandir, St. Mary's High School, Ben Garden High School, Kendriya Vidyalaya NEIST, Kendriya Vidyalaya ONGC, Kendriya Vidyalaya Air Force Station, Jawahar Navodaya Vidyalaya, Jorhat, Jonaki Sangha Vidyalaya, Assam Valley English Medium School, Sankar Dev Vidya Niketan, Bahona Boys High School, Royal Oak High School, Pragjyotika Titabar, Jatiya Vidyalaya Titabar, St. Anthony's High School, Maan International High School, Mihiram Saikia Higher Secondary School, Sankardev Seminary School, Jorhat Govt. Boys' H.S and M.P. School, Jorhat Govt. Girls H.S. and M.P. School, Jorhat Model Composite School, Gitarthi Girls High School, DCB Girls High School, Dipankar Vidyapith, 4 No Ward Primary School, Rashtrabhasa School, Rebakanta Baruah School, and Bidyadhar Saikia School.

Jorhat is the seat of learning with the first agricultural university in the northeast region — Assam Agricultural University — established in 1969. Apart from that it has many prominent higher educational and research institutions. Those are - Jorhat Engineering College (1960), North East Institute of Science and Technology (NEIST) (1961), National Institute of Design, Jorhat (2019), Assam Women's University (2013), HRH The Prince of Wales Institute of Engineering and Technology (POWIET) (1926), Tocklai Tea Research Institute (1911), Rain Forest Research Institute (1988), Jorhat Medical College and Hospital (2009), Jorhat Institute of Science & Technology (JIST) and Kaziranga University (2012). Some other educational institutes of Jorhat districts are - CKB Commerce College, Jorhat College, Jorhat Law College, Dr.J.K.Saikia Homeopathic Medical College and Hospital, DCB Girls College, Bahona College, Jorhat Kendriya Mahavidyalaya, Kakojan College, Chandra Kamal Bezbaruah College, Nanda Nath Saikia College and Mariani College.

== Media ==
The healthy education and cultural life of Jorhat can be best judged from the fact that the district has as many as five daily newspapers published from two publishing groups.

The Janambhumi Group of Publications are the oldest media group of Jorhat. The Saptahik Janambhumi, the Dainik Janambhumi, and the Eastern Clarion are its sister newspapers. The Spatahik Janambhumi celebrated its 50 years of circulation and the Dainik Janambhumi crossed its 25 years of existence.

The G.L. Publication publishes three newspapers from Guwahati and Jorhat simultaneously. They are the North East Times (English), Amar Asom (Assamese), and the Purbanchal Prohori (Hindi).

The other newspapers published from Jorhat are Dainik Agradoot, Asomiya Khabar and The Telegraph.
