= Tahir Qureshi =

Pakistani environmentalist and coastal ecosystem expert (1946–2020)

Muhammad Tahir Tahir Qureshi
- Born: 1946
- Died: 29 Dec 2020
- Occupations: Divisional Forest Officer, Sindh Pakistan
- Employer(s): Ministry of Climate Change (Pakistan); Government of Pakistan employee as a forester
- Known for: Environmentalist; conservationist

Tahir Qureshi Mangrove Man or Mangroves Hero of Pakistan (1946-2020 Urdu بابائے مینگروز پاکستان ) was a senior Pakistani environmentalist and coastal ecosystem expert at the IUCN International Union for Conservation of Nature who dedicated his whole life to the preservation and expansion of Mangrove trees in Pakistan Indus River Delta-Arabian Sea mangroves and other coastal areas. Tahir Qureshi had played a key role in rehabilitation of more than 30,000 hectares of mangrove forests in Sindh and Baluchistan. International Union for Conservation of Nature awarded him title Hero of mangroves.

== Environmental role ==
Tahir Qureshi rehabilitated more than 30,000 hectares of mangrove forests in Sindh and Baluchistan. International Union for Conservation of Nature awarded him title Hero of mangroves. Due to his continuous efforts on 22 June 2013, Sindh Forest Department, Govt. of Sindh, Pakistan, Tahir Qureshi with the help of 300 local coastal volunteer planters set the Guinness World Record by planting 541,176 mangrove saplings at Kharo Chan, Thatta, Sindh, Pakistan in a little over 12 hours. This is the highest number of saplings planted within a day under the Guinness World Record category of "Maximum Number of Trees Planted in a Day".

== Personal life ==
Tahir Qureshi's family migrated from British India into Shikarpur Sindh Pakistan. He shifted to Hyderabad city and got a Master's degree in Zoology, being appointed a lecturer. Then from Peshawar Forest academy he got a degree in Forestry, and after CSS started working as Districts forest officer. He died on 29 December 2020 in Karachi Pakistan at the age of 74.

== See also ==
- Indus River Delta-Arabian Sea mangroves
- Arif Minhas
- Jadav Payeng
- Dr Tahir Shamsi
