= Sophia Gholz =

Award-winning American author of books for young readers

Sophia Mallonée Gholz (born October 17, 1980) is an American writer of children's books, both fiction and non-fiction.

== Early life and education ==
Sophia Gholz was born in Gainesville, Florida, where she grew up. She was the second child born to Nancy Dohn, an American corporate manager, and Henry Gholz, a forest ecologist and professor at the University of Florida. Her favorite children's authors when she was growing up were Shel Silverstein and Madeleine L'Engle.

== Career ==
Gholz's first book, The Boy Who Grew A Forest: The True Story of Jadav Payeng (published by Sleeping Bear Press in 2019 and illustrated by Kayla Harren) is a picture book that has been translated into multiple languages.

Gholz's books include Jack Horner, Dinosaur Hunter!, a picture book biography about Jack Horner, the paleontologist who inspired the main character in Jurassic Park; This is Your World: The Story of Bob Ross, the television art teacher; and A History of Toilet Paper (and Other Potty Tools).

Gholz's media appearances and interviews include BBC UK, The Sun News, Nonahood News, North East News India, Discovery Channel, Orlando Voyager, The Buzz TV The Bookshop at the End of the Internet Podcast, and The New York Times.

== Select awards ==
- Florida State Book Award Gold Medal for The Boy Who Grew A Forest (2020)
- South Carolina Children's Book Award Nominee (2020–21)
- Green Earth Book Award Honor (2020)
- Crystal Kite Award Winner, Southeast Region (2020)
- Keystone to Reading Book Award Shortlist (2020–21)
- Children's Book Council Notable Social Studies Trade Books for Young People (2020)
- Sigurd F. Olson Nature Writing Award Winner from Northland College (2019)
- Eureka! Nonfiction Children's Book Honor Award, California Reading Association (2019)

== Published works ==
- The Boy Who Grew a Forest: The True Story of Jadav Payeng (2019), illustrated by Kayla Harren
- Jack Horner, Dinosaur Hunter! (2021), illustrated by Dave Shephard
- This is Your World: The Story of Bob Ross (2021), illustrated by Robin Boyden
- A History of Toilet Paper (and Other Potty Tools) (2022), illustrated by Xiana Teimoy
- Bug on the Rug (2022), illustrated by Susan Batori

== Personal life ==
In 2008, Gholz married Jeff Olson, an American photographer and businessman. They had two children and live in Florida.

== Adaptations ==
In 2022, stage rights were acquired to adapt the German translation, Der Junge, Einen Eald Pflanzte (Zuckersüß Verlag), of Gholz's book The Boy Who Grew A Forest: The True Story of Jadav Payeng, for a stage production at the Staatstheater Meiningen Theater in Berlin and the Humboldt Forum in Berlin.
