= Indus River Delta–Arabian Sea mangroves =

Large mangrove ecoregion on the Arabian Sea coast of Pakistan and India

Ecoregion: Indus River Delta-Arabian Sea mangroves
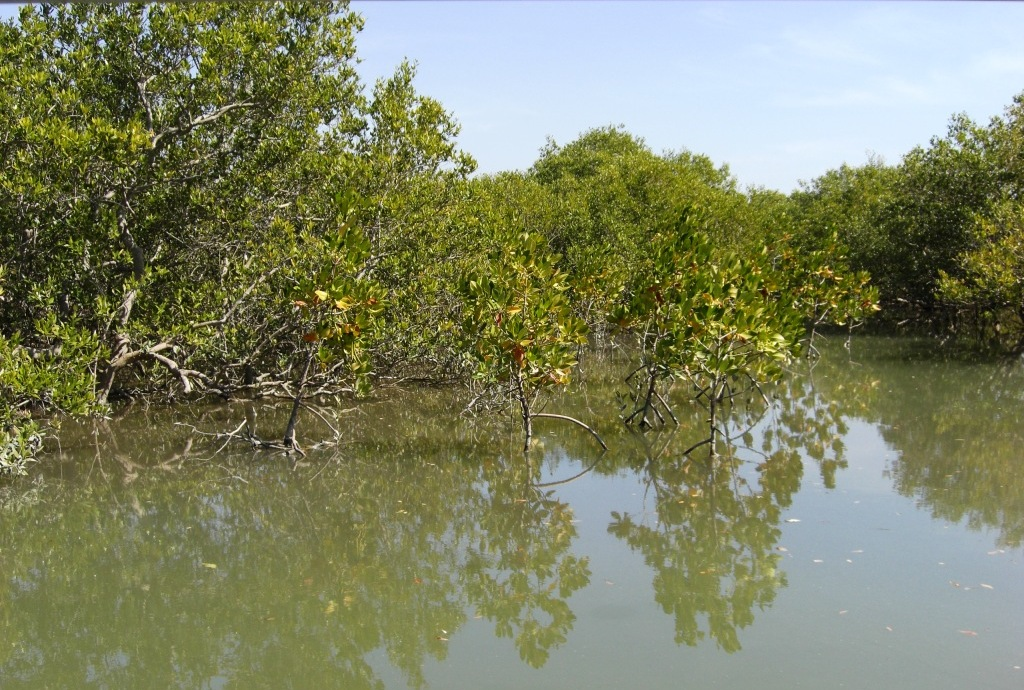
- Mangrove forests in Keti Bandar

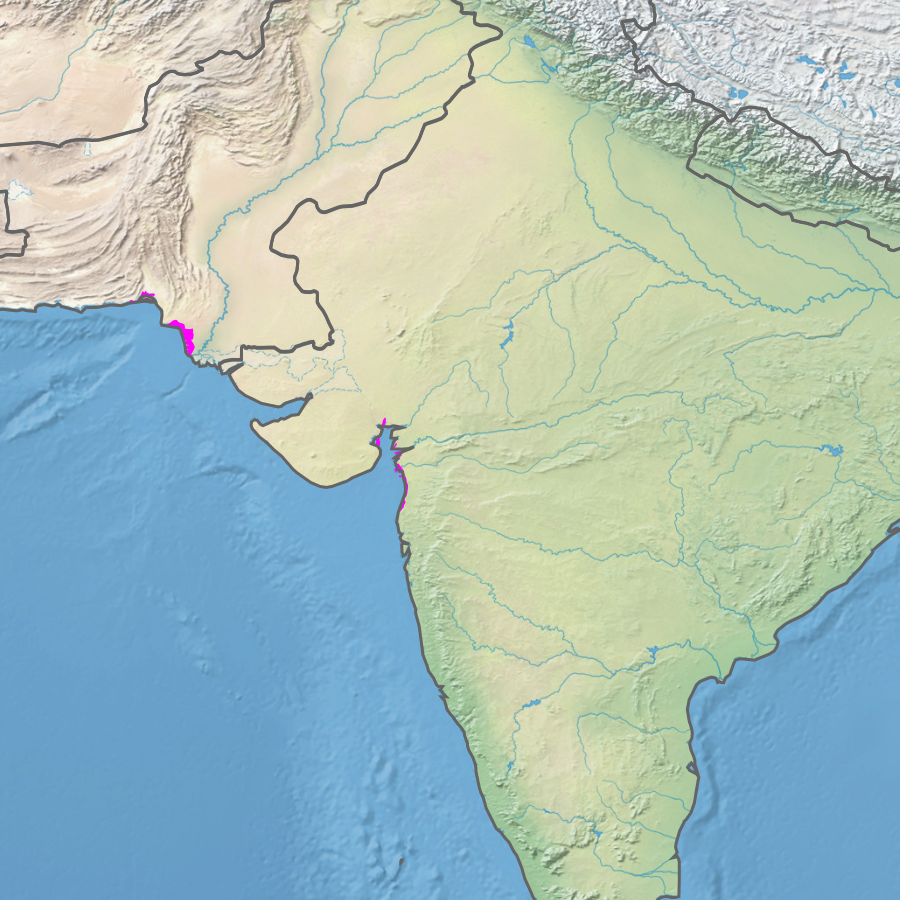
- Ecoregion territory (in purple)

Ecology
- Realm: Indomalayan
- Biome: Mangrove

Geography
- Area: 5,698 km^{2} (2,200 mi^{2})
- Country: Pakistan, India
- Coordinates: 24.65°N 67.30103°E

The Indus River Delta-Arabian Sea mangroves are a large mangrove ecoregion on the Arabian Sea coast of Sindh Province, Pakistan, and the Gulfs of Kutch and Khambhat in Gujarat, India. The mangroves are the seventh largest mangrove forest in the world.

The Indus River Delta forms a vast alluvial fan composed of mud flats interspersed with channels and fringed with mangrove forests. The delta has gotten significantly smaller in the 20th century as development and coastal management practices reduce the resilience of the delta. The delta had 16% cover by mangroves in 1990, and has decreased by 10% by 2017.

Much of the forested area has been destroyed and the remaining parts are threatened, in part because practices like dykes make the land no longer suitable for mangroves, and encroachment by communities harvesting mangrove wood. Other threats include pollution and oil spills from the city of Karachi.

== Location and description ==
With a length of 2,880 km (1,800 mi), the Indus River is one of the longest rivers in the world, starting in the glaciers of the Himalayan range in Tibet and flowing through India and Pakistan. Where the river enters the Arabian Sea in Sindh Province, Pakistan, there is an alluvial fan that extends along 150 km (93 mi) of coastline. It is formed from the vast quantities of silt that have been washed down the river for over fifty million years and covers an area of about 600,000 hectares (1,500,000 acres). There are seventeen major channels, many smaller ones, extensive mudflats and fringing mangrove swamps which form a barrier against storm surges.

These mangroves are found in the Indus River Delta on the Arabian sea, an even saltier estuary than usual due to the salts brought to the coast by the Indus from the Thar Desert, a process that is ongoing as the river is increasingly used for irrigation and water supply. Mangroves are an important habitat where salt and fresh water mix and support a range of plants specialised to survive in this salty environment, and large numbers of fishes and crustaceans that find food, shelter and oxygen in the waters beneath the tree roots. The temperature is hot in summer, reaching 50 °C (122 °F), and may fall to near freezing point in winter. The rain falls in the southwest monsoon between July and September and averages 100 to 500 mm (4 to 20 in) of precipitation. The Indus River is used extensively for irrigation and by the time it reaches the delta, the flow of freshwater is down by more than 90% compared to historic levels. Active flow only lasts for about two months, and the sediment load is similarly diminished. Saline water intrudes upstream for about 80 km (50 mi) and this affects both the mangroves growing in the area and the agricultural land. Loss of sediment causes increased coastal erosion, and this is exacerbated by land subsidence and rising sea levels. Other factors affecting the mangrove areas are pollution from sewage and industrial effluent, and parts of the mangrove area have been lost to agriculture and urban development.

== Flora ==
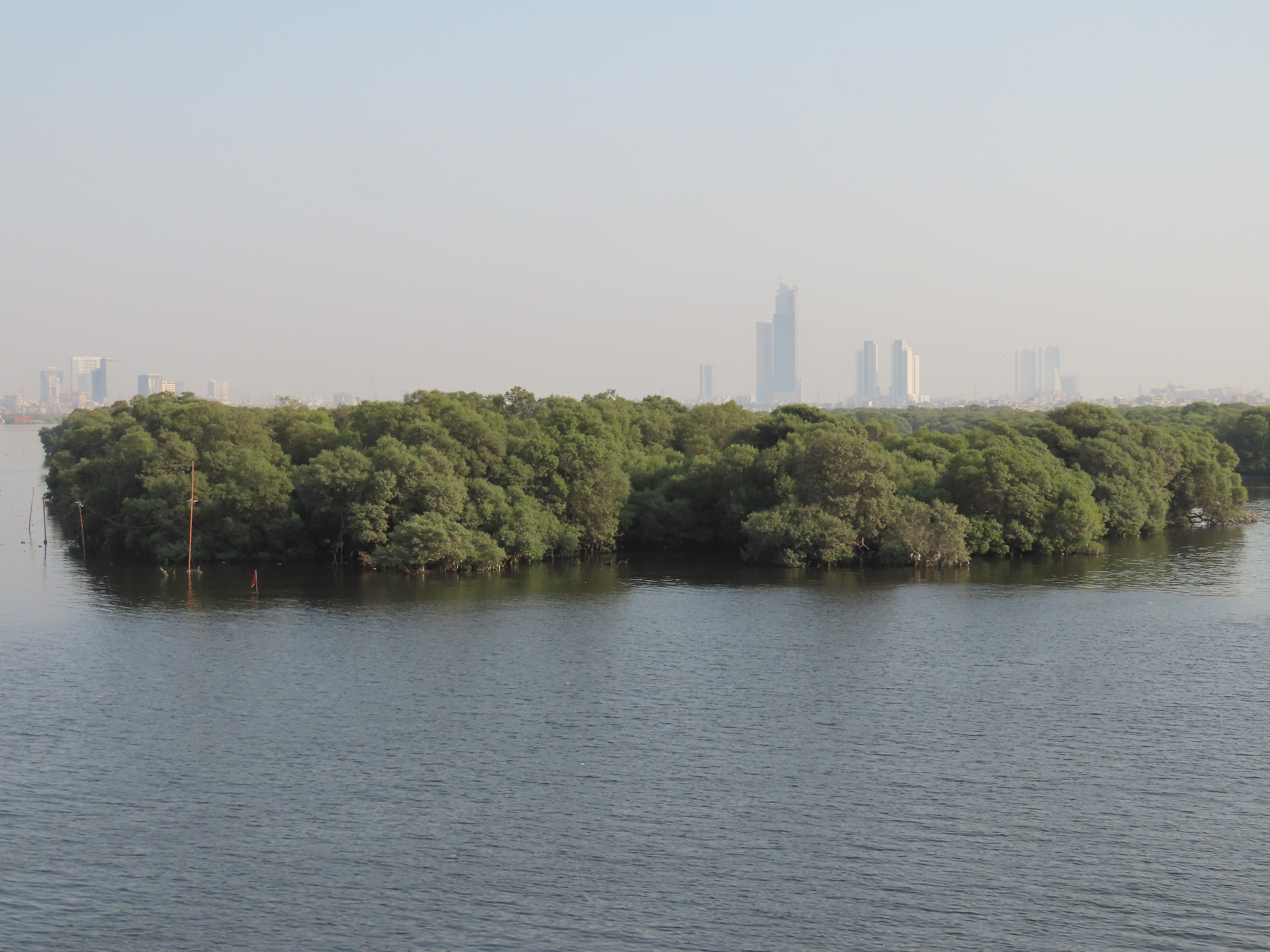
Mangroves near Karachi.

The flora of the delta is not diverse as few plants can survive the severe conditions of heat and salinity. In 2003, mangrove forests were estimated to cover 820 square kilometres (320 sq mi) of the delta. 95% of the trees were grey mangroves (Avicennia marina), with the remaining 5%, growing on small areas of higher ground, being red mangrove (Rhizophora mucronata), Indian mangrove (Ceriops tagal) and black mangrove (Aegiceras corniculatum). Sea holly (Acanthus ilicifolius) and other salt-tolerant plants grow in drier parts. Mangrove forests have a thick canopy and an undergrowth consisting mainly of saplings of the mangrove trees.. Coconuts are also present.

== Fauna ==
The mangroves are especially important as a sheltered haven where fish, crustaceans and invertebrates can reproduce and fish fry can shelter among the pneumatophores, the tangle of aerial roots that help the mangroves survive in a saline environment. They are also home to large numbers of seabirds. Mammals of the delta include fishing cats, wild boars, Indian hog deer, smooth-coated otters, small Indian civets, South Asian jungle cats, Persian jackals, desert hares,Indian Ocean humpback dolphins, and finless porpoises. The delta is home to large quantities of waterbirds including greater flamingos, Dalmatian pelicans, great white pelicans, grey herons, purple herons, night herons, Brahminy kites, Western marsh harriers, black-shouldered kites, common kestrels, lesser kestrels, Eurasian sparrowhawks, greater coucals, grey-headed swamphens, water rails and as many as 60,000 migratory birds arrive each year.

== Threats and preservation ==
Pollution from the industrial city and port of Karachi is a threat to habitats in the delta, as is depletion of the Indus as water is extracted. Oil spills are another hazard. Most of the Indus Delta mangroves have been cleared for firewood and to create grazing land but some remains in three protected areas: Marho Kotri, Cut Munarki Chach Wildlife Sanctuaries and Mirpur Sakro Game Reserve. The World Wildlife Fund assesses the status of the mangrove habitat as being critical or endangered.

In projects started in 1985, the Sindh Forest Department has been in the forefront of replanting and restoring mangrove areas in the delta, with support of Tahir Qureshi Senior environmentlist and International Union for Conservation of Nature, the United Nations Environmental Programme, UNESCO and the World Bank. About 160 square kilometres (62 sq mi) of grey mangroves and red mangroves have been established and a further 30 square kilometres (12 sq mi) of red mangrove restored.

== Biochemical role in pollution mitigation ==
Beyond their ecological value, the mangrove forests of the Indus Delta serve as a critical natural biochemical filter for pollutants originating from upstream urban and industrial centers like Karachi. Mangrove sediments are predominantly anaerobic, fostering specialized microbial consortia capable of degrading complex hydrocarbons and organic pollutants through sulfate reduction and methanogenesis. Furthermore, mangrove species such as Avicennia marina exhibit remarkable phytoremediation capabilities, actively sequestering heavy metals like lead, cadmium, and hexavalent chromium (Cr(VI)) from industrial effluents into their root systems and leaf litter, preventing these toxins from entering the broader marine food web. This natural bioremediation process is increasingly vital as the delta faces mounting pressure from untreated municipal wastewater and industrial discharge, highlighting the need to preserve these ecosystems as a nature-based biochemical engineering solution.
