= Chandra Narayan Singha =

Ahom dynasty member and government official

- Portrait, c.1926

Member of Assam Legislative Council
- In office c.1921–c.1923
- Constituency: Nominated

Personal details
- Died: c.1936
- Children: Dandeswar Narayan Singha; Nagendra Narayan Singha
- Parent: Nara Narayan Singha (father)
- Relatives: Purandar Singha (great-uncle); Jishnu Barua (great-grandson)
- Occupation: Mouzadar

Chandra Narayan Singha (died c. 1936) was a descendant of the Ahom royal family and nominated member of the Assam Legislative Council. He served as the mouzadar of Jorhat, and was a great-nephew of the last Ahom King, Purandar Singha.

== Ancestry ==
Chandra Narayan Singha was the son of Nara Narayan Singha, Majumelia Raja, and grandson of Radhanath Gohain. Chandra Narayan Singha was thus the great-nephew of the last Ahom King Purandar Singha, who was the brother of Radhanath. Chandra was the great-grandson of Brajanath Gohain, Charing Raja, and had two brothers, Guna and Padma.

== Early career and activities ==
In 1888, Singha was appointed the mouzadar of Jorhat by the British government. Chandra Narayan Singha attended the Delhi Durbar of King George V and Queen Mary of Teck in 1911, representing the family of the Ahom dynasty.

== Legislative career ==
Singha was a nominated member of Assam Legislative Council in the 1920s. This came as seats in the council were reserved for Ahom nominees, which led to Singha along with Padmanath Gohain Baruah being nominated to the council. In September 1922, he voted in favour of a resolution established a government madrasa which was passed, and also for the provision of scholarships for the study of commerce which was defeated. In August 1923, he supported a proposal to postpone land revenue resettlement for five years, arguing that the condition of the ryots was "already miserable", and that they could not "bear any more increase of the land revenue".

== Family and descendants ==
Chandra Narayan Singha had sons including Dandeswar and Nagendra. Through his son Dandeswar, he was the grandfather of Nripendra Narayan Singha, a noted sportsman and football referee. Through Nagendra, he was the grandfather of Ajit Narayan Singha, a social worker who served as a mouzadar of Jorhat, and also of Alok Narayan Singha who also served as Jorhat mouzadar. Also through Nagendra, he was the grandfather of author Prativa Barua, the mother of civil servant and chief secretary Jishnu Barua.

- Chandra Narayan Singha
  - Dandeswar Narayan Singha
    - Nripendra Narayan Singha
  - Nagendra Narayan Singha
    - Prativa Barua
      - Jishnu Barua
      - Paul Barua
    - Ajit Narayan Singha
    - Alok Narayan Singha

== Death ==
Singha was recorded as deceased by 1936.
