= List of chief secretaries of Assam =

Chief Secretary of Assam of Government of Assam

- Incumbent; Dr. Ravi Kota since 1 April 2024
- Style: The Honourable
- Reports to: Governor and Chief minister
- Appointer: Chief Minister of Assam
- Inaugural holder: P.C. Lyon
- Formation: 16 October 1905 (120 years ago)

The Chief Secretary of Assam is the most senior civil servant in Assam. The secretary acts as the ex-officio Secretary to the Council of Ministers, therefore is also known as Secretary to the Cabinet. The Chief secretary is the Head of the Cabinet Secretariat Department. The functions include providing secretarial assistance to the cabinet, ensuring the implementation of decisions, acting as the policy coordination centre, serving as a data bank of information, organizing conferences. The Chief Secretary is an officer of Indian Administrative Service and is a member of the executive branch of the Government of Assam. The Chief Secretary ranks 23rd on the Indian order of precedence.

Dr. Ravi Kota is the incumbent Chief Secretary of Assam from 1 April 2024.

== Chief secretaries ==
No.	Name	Took office	Left office
1	P.C. Lyon	16 October 1905	1909
2	H.Lemesurior	1910	1912
3	W.J. Reid	April 1912	1914
4	B.C. Allen	1915	1917
5	J.E. Webster	1917	1919
6	A.W. Botham	1920	1925
7	G.E. Soames	1926	1930
8	W.A. Cosgrave	1931	1933
9	J.A. Dawson	28 November 1933	6 September 1936
10	H.G Dennehy	7 September 1936	1 January 1948
11	S.P. Desai	1 January 1948	16 November 1950
12	A.D. Pandit	16 November 1950	16 November 1951
13	S.L. Mehta	16 November 1951	19 May 1952
14	S.K. Dutta	19 May 1952	20 April 1961
15	A.N.M. Saleh	26 November 1955	13 August 1956
16	A.N. Kidwai	20 April 1961	9 December 1968
17	N.K. Rustomji	10 December 1968	28 August 1971
18	Dharmananda Das	29 August 1971	30 June 1975
19	K.G.R. Iyer	9 July 1975	10 July 1975
20	B.K. Bhuyan	10 July 1975	3 May 1976
21	Rana K.D.N. Singh	3 May 1976	8 July 1977
22	S.M.L. Bhatnagar	8 July 1977	18 November 1978
23	R.S. Paramasivan	18 November 1978	1 May 1980
24	B.S. Sarao	14 November 1979	6 January 1980
25	Ramesh Chandra	1 May 1980	1 December 1983
26	P.H. Trivedi	9 August 1982	29 November 1982
27	A.K. Palit	1 December 1983	1 July 1985
28	P.P. Trivedi	1 July 1985	23 January 1986
29	J.C. Nampui	15 February 1986	1 November 1986
30	A.K. Saikia	1 November 1986, 1 December 1986	1 December 1986, 1 July 1988
31	S.D. Phene	1 July 1988	17 March 1989
32	A.P. Sarwan	17 March 1989	28 February 1990
33	H.N. Das	28 February 1990	28 February 1995
34	A. Bhattacharjya	1 March 1995	11 March 1996
35	T.K. Kamilla	12 May 1996	19 August 1997
36	V.S. Jafa	20 August 1997	22 March 1998
37	P.K. Bora	23 March 1998	31 July 2002
38	P.K. Datta	1 August 2002	31 July 2003
39	J.P. Rajkhowa	1 August 2003	31 October 2004
40	S. Kabilan	1 November 2004	22 December 2006
41	P.C. Sarma	22 December 2006	31 March 2010
42	N.K. Das	31 March 2010	30 July 2013
43	P.P. Varma	30 June 2013	30 September 2013
44	Jitesh Khosla	30 September 2013	31 May 2015
45	Vinod Kr. Pipersenia	31 May 2015	28 February 2018
46	Tshering Y. Das	1 March 2018	31 August 2018
47	Alok Kumar	1 September 2018	31 December 2019
48	Kumar Sanjay Krishna	1 January 2020	31 October 2020
49	Jishnu Barua	31 October 2020	31 August 2022
50	Paban Kumar Borthakur	1 September 2022	31 March 2024
51	Dr. Ravi Kota	1 April 2024	Incumbent
