= Dhekiakhowa Bornamghar =

Ancient place of worship in Assam, India

Dhekiakhowa Bornaamghar
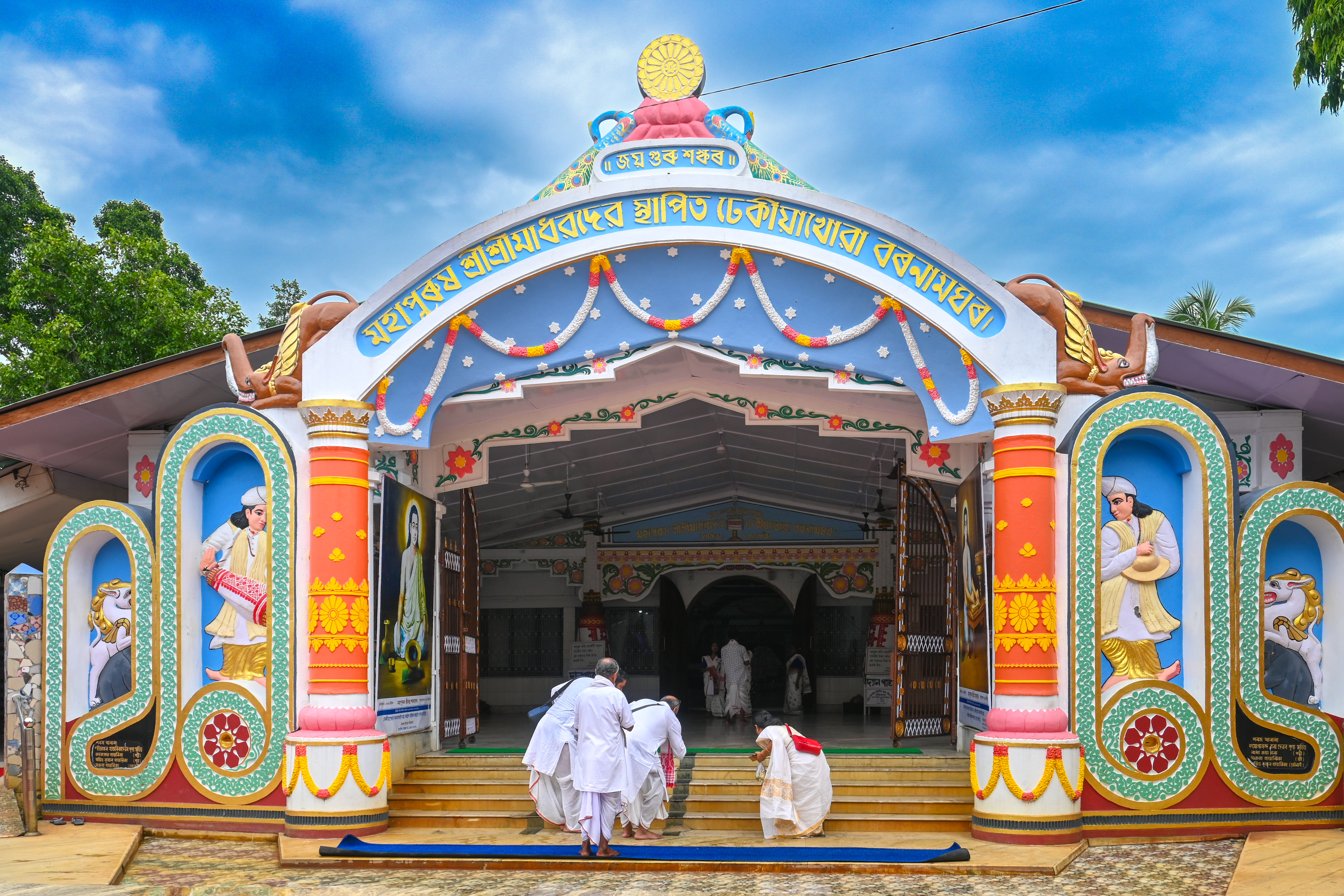
- Gate of Dhekiakhowa Bornaamghar

- Dhekiakhowa Bornaamghar

Religion
- Affiliation: Hinduism
- District: Jorhat district

Location
- State: Assam
- Country: India
- Coordinates: 26.47°N 94.19°E

Architecture
- Creator: Madhavdeva
- Completed: 1528 (1450 Saka)

Website
- dhekiakhowabornamghar.com/

Dhekiakhowa Bornaamghar is a naamghar in Jorhat district, Assam, India, that was established by saint-reformer Madhavdeva. In 1528 (1450 Saka), Madhavdeva kindled an earthen lamp there, which according to the naamghar's managing committee has been burning continuously since then, being refueled with mustard oil by the priests. It is located at Dhekiakhowa village of Jorhat district, 15 km towards the east of Jorhat city 3.5 km away from National Highway 37. It is called a Bornaamghar because of its historical association and large campus.

The naamghar is situated in a complex of facilities spread over 13 bighas of land. The naamghar and other facilities are maintained by a managing committee with donations from devotees. Besides the maintenance of the complex, the managing committee sponsors various social and cultural programs.

There is an anecdote after the name of Dhekiakhowa Naamghar. Guru Madhavdeva after taking up the duty of reforming people and spreading the Ekasarana Naam Dharma came to stay in this small village. He took shelter for the night at the hut of an old woman, who served him rice with Dhekia Saak (Fiddlehead Fern), a very common wild vegetable. The old woman was very embarrassed to have served the Saint guru like this but he was immensely pleased by the dinner. So he started a naamghar there and gave the responsibility of kindling the earthen lamp to the old woman. The naamghar was later known as Dhekiakhowa Naamghar.

A lot of visitors and devotees gather in the naamghar every day, especially during the sacred month of Bhado (August–September), for this month being the Death Anniversaries of both the gurus Srimanta Sankardeva and Madhavdeva

== Legend ==
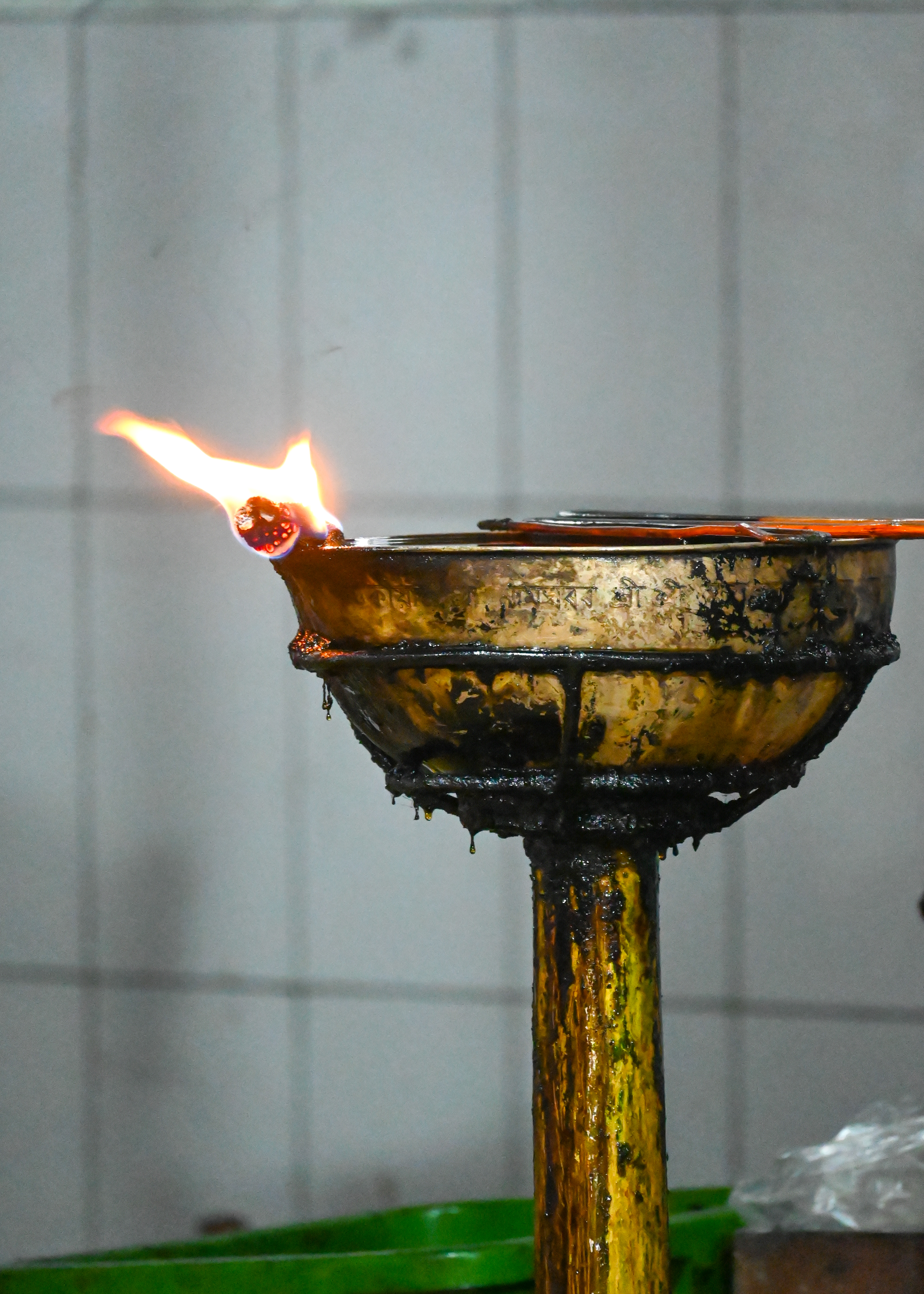
The sacred earthen lamp, said to have been burning continuously since 1528

There are many stories associated with this Bornamghar. It is said that the main pillar of the namghar is made of a Sal tree. One night one of the bhakats (monk) of the namghar saw in his dream that the river near the Bornamghar known as Dhekiakhowa jaan is flowing in opposite direction and is carrying a Sal tree mean to be for the construction of the Bornamghar. Next day when people saw that dream to be true, they made the main pillars of the Bornamghar from the tree.

== Festivals ==
Several festivals and sessions of special worship, besides the daily worships, are celebrated every year in certain months. These festivities are attended by lakhs of devotees:

1. Paal Naam (পাল নাম) – a month-long festival of worship in the month of Bhada (ভাদ) from mid-August to mid-September
2. Srimanta Sankardeva birth anniversary during the month of Aahin(আহিন) from mid-September to mid-October
3. Madhavdeva birth anniversary during the month of Jeth(জেঠ), from 15 May to 15 June
4. Bhaona (ভাওনা) Mohotsav in the month of Chot ( চ'ত) or Chaitra from 15 March to 15 April
5. Raas lila (ৰাস লীলা) in the month of November

== Gallery ==
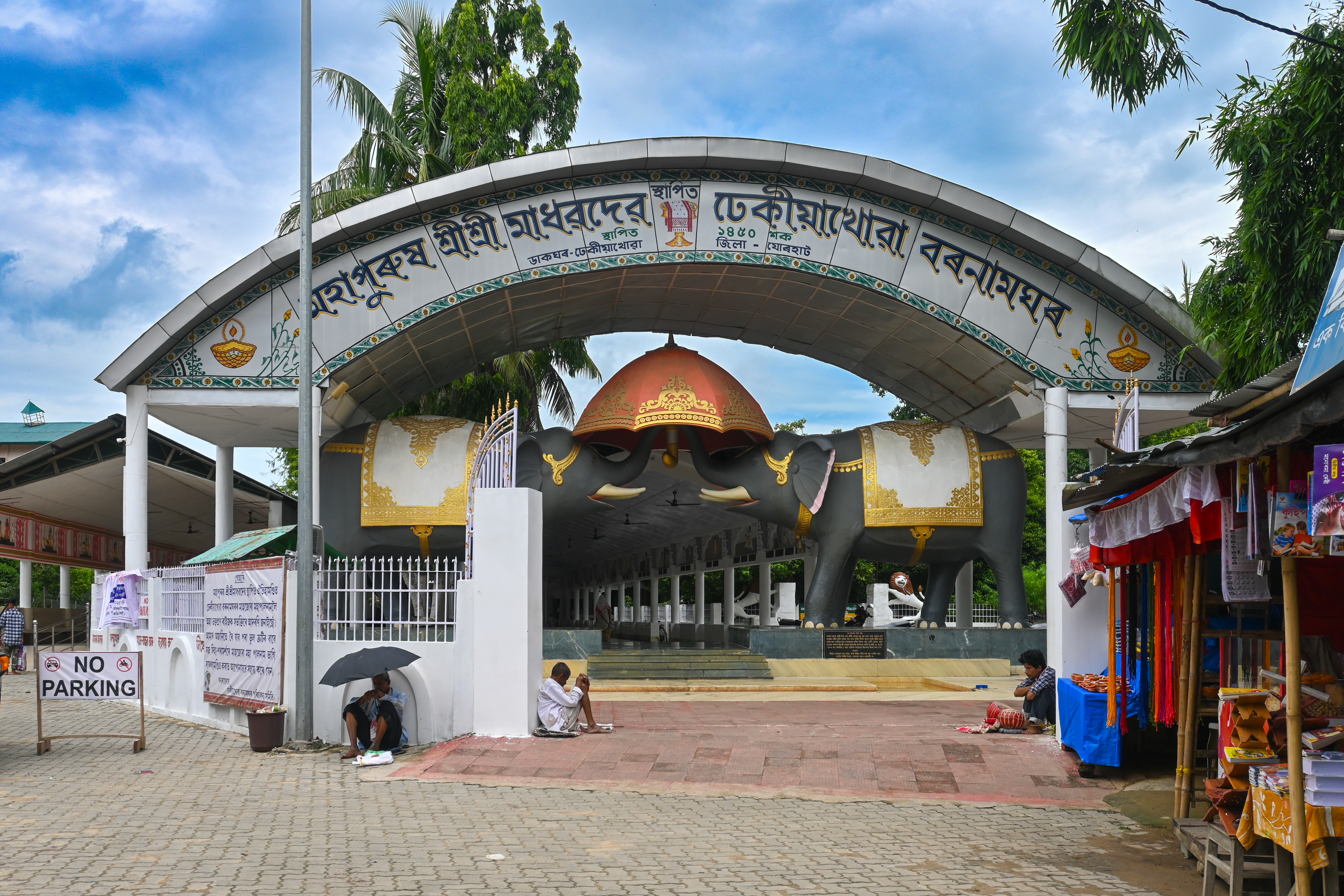
Gateway of Dhekiakhowa Bornamghar

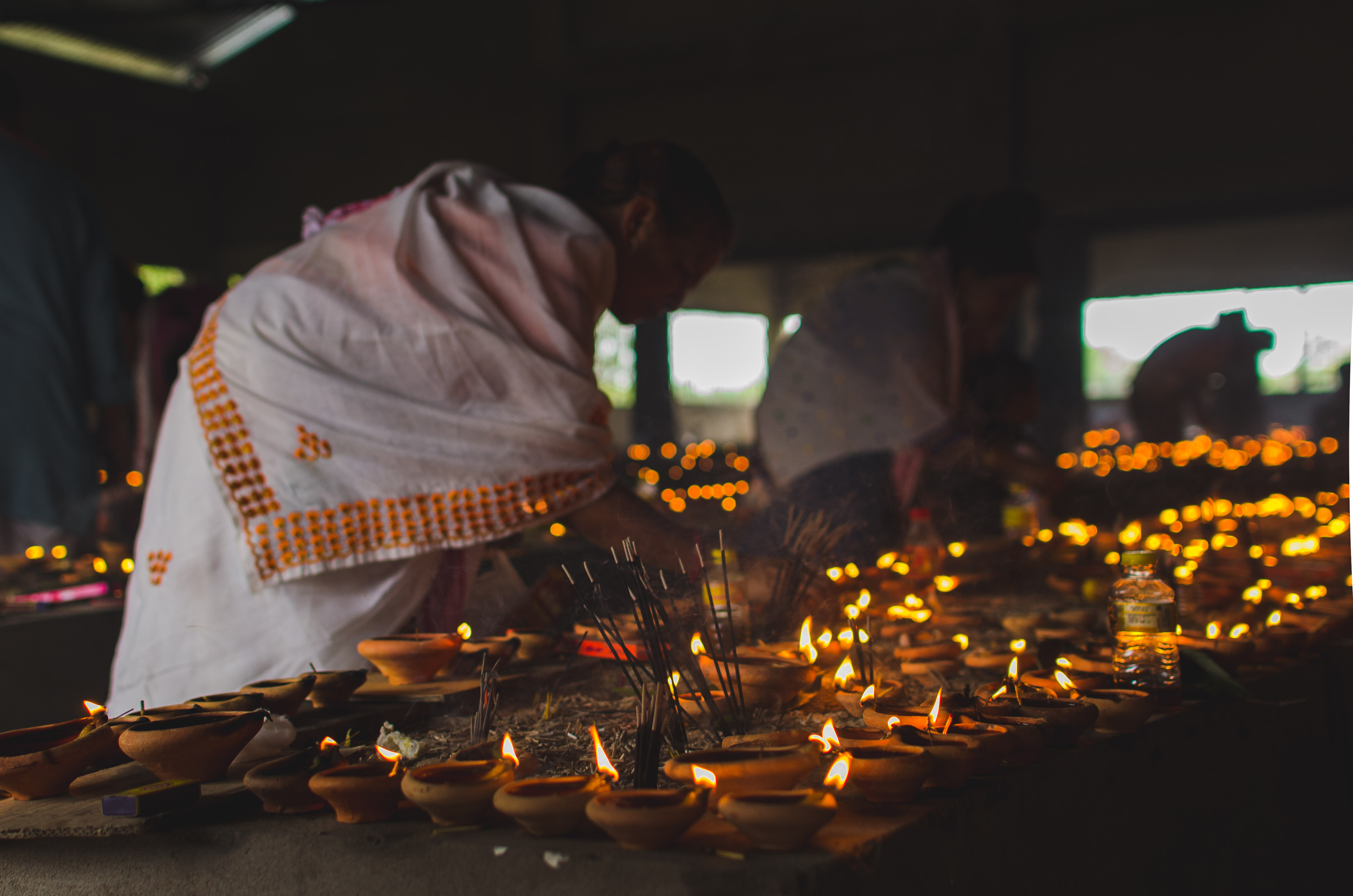
People lighting earthen lamps at Dhekiakhowa Bornamghar.

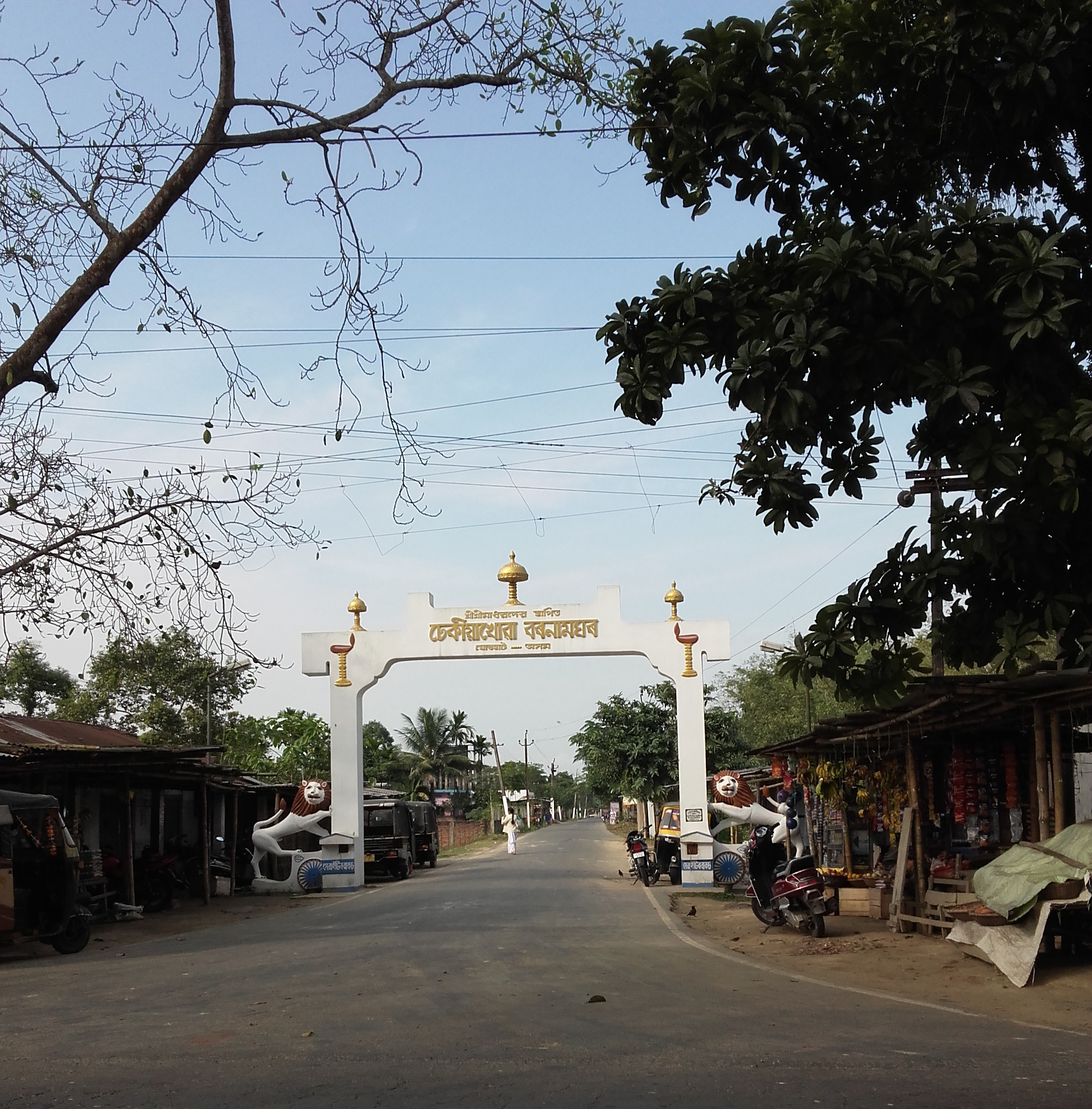
Sri Sri Dhkiakhowa Bornamghar old turon

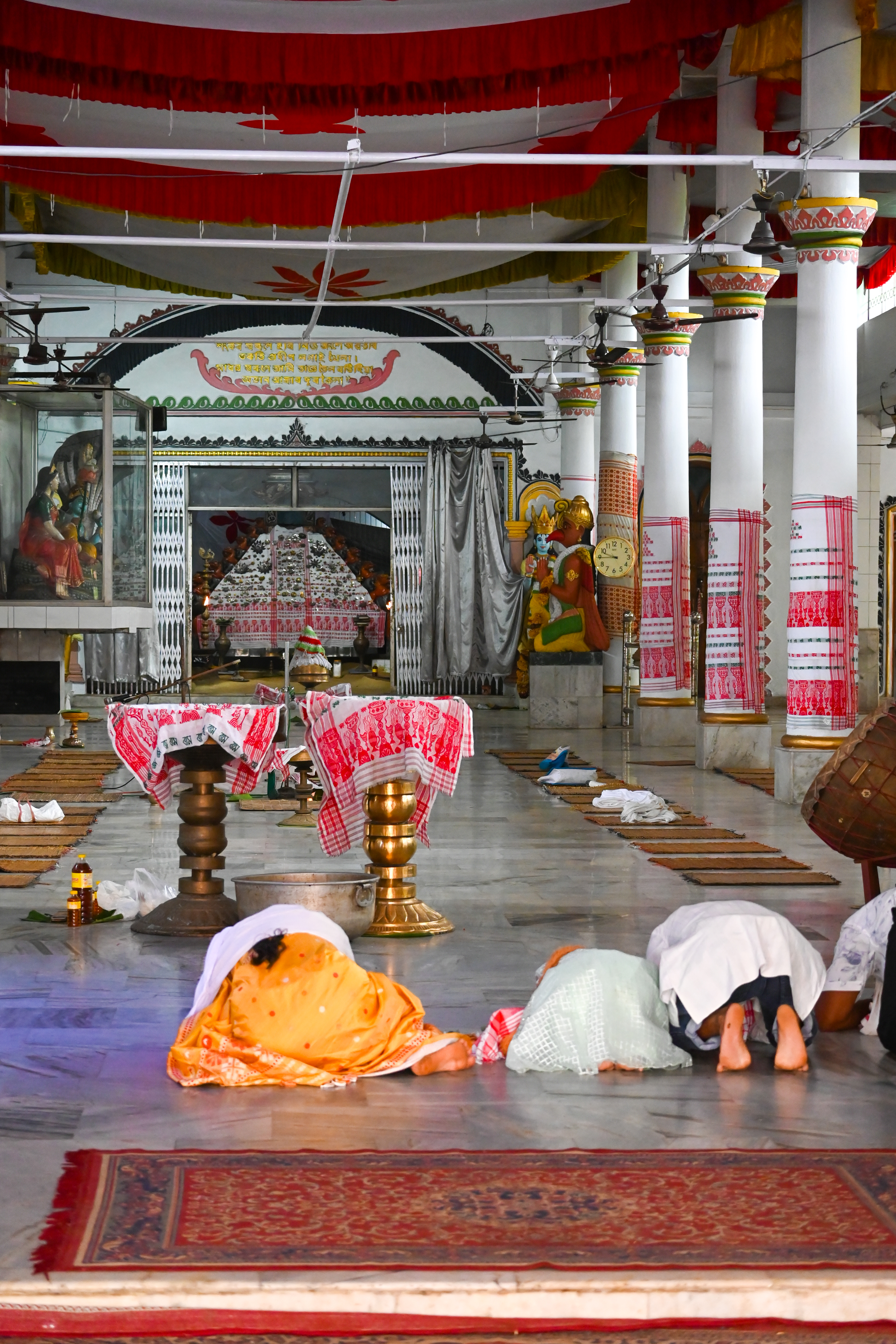
Inner view of the Dhekiakhowa Bornamghor
