= Burhi Gosani Devalaya Jorhat =

Ancient place of worship of Devi Durga in Assam, India

Burhi Gosani Devalaya
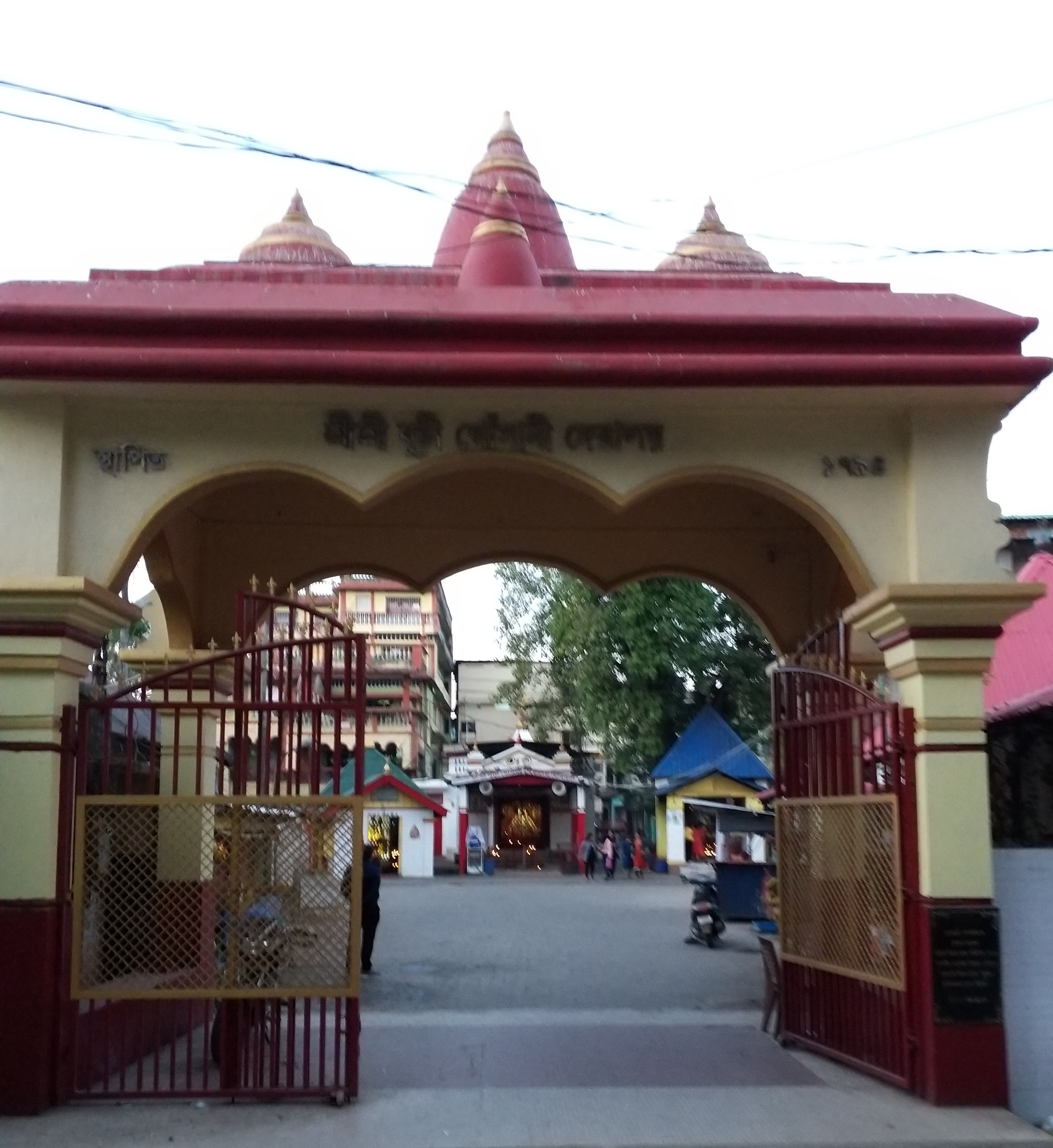

Religion
- Affiliation: Hinduism
- Deity: Primordial deity Burhi later hinduised to Goddess Durga
- Festival: Durga Puja

Location
- Location: Jorhat
- State: Assam
- Country: India
- Interactive map of Burhi Gosani Devalaya
- Coordinates: 26°45′32″N 94°12′53″E

Architecture
- Established: 1794; 232 years ago

Burhi Gosani Devalaya is a Hindu shakta temple which was originally used to worship the primordial deity Burhi and was later sanskritised to goddess Durga. It is situated at Dewal Road in Jorhat, Assam, India.

== Location ==
The location coordinates of the temple are 26°45'32"N 94°12'53"E

== History ==
The idol of the temple was brought by Ahom king Rudra Singha from the Jaintia hills of Meghalya to the Ahom kingdom in Assam. Later Ahom king Gaurinath Singha shifted the capital from Rangpur (Ahom capital) to Jorhat and established the Burhi Gosani Devalaya in Jorhat in the year 1794. The main event of the temple is the annual Durga Puja celebrations.

== Gallery ==
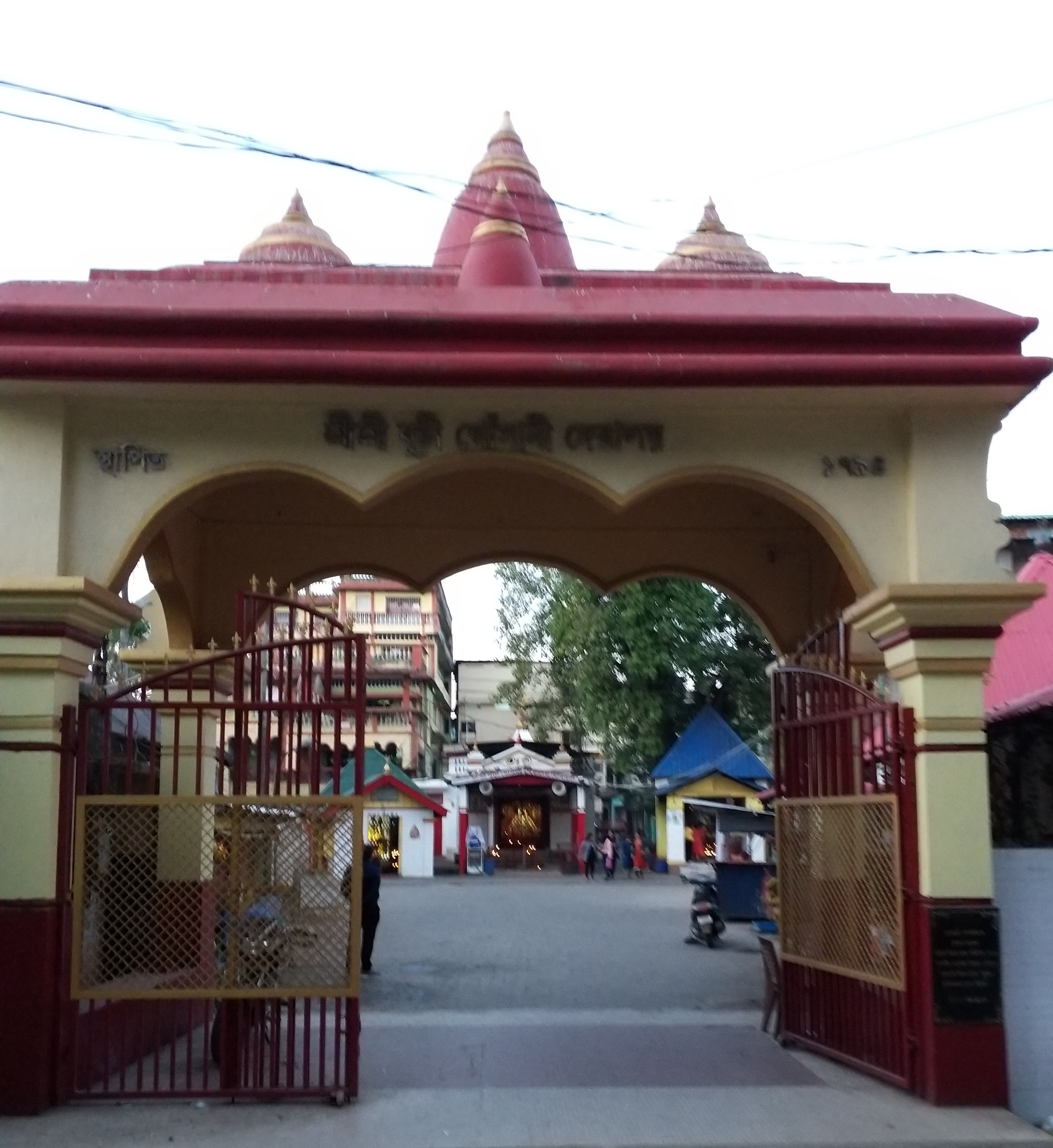
Sri Sri Burhi Gosani Devalaya gate

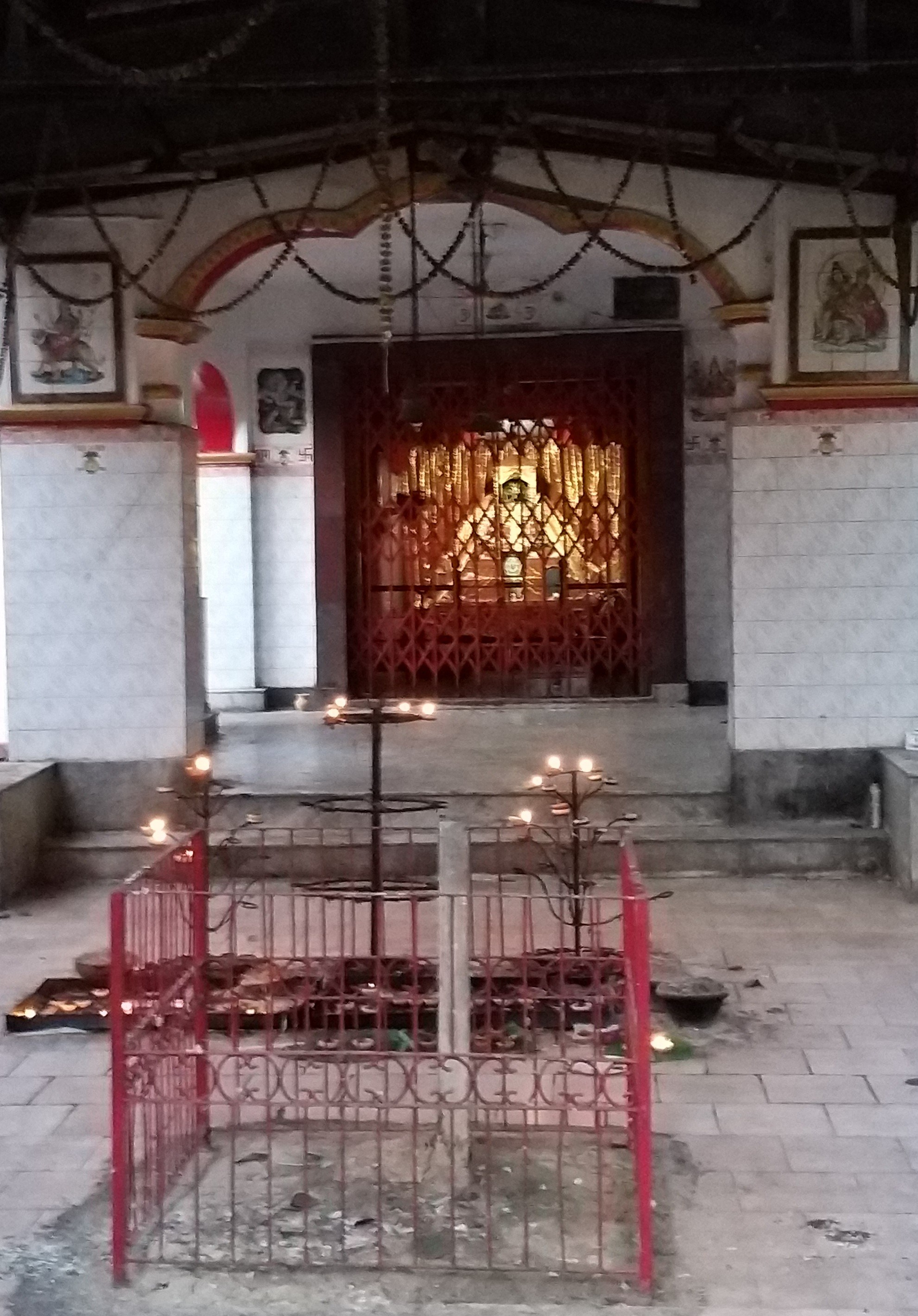
The Deity Burhi Gosani Devalaya

== Bibliography ==
Dutta, Sristidhar (1985), The Mataks and their Kingdom, Allahabad: Chugh Publications
