= Molai forest =

Forest in Assam, India

Molai Forest Molai kathoni
- Location within Assam
- Interactive map of Molai Forest

Geography
- Location: Assam, India
- Coordinates: 26°51′0″N 94°9′8″E

Molai forest is a forest on Majuli district in the Brahmaputra River near Kokilamukh, Assam, India. It is named after Jadav Payeng, an Indian environmental activist and forestry worker.

== History ==
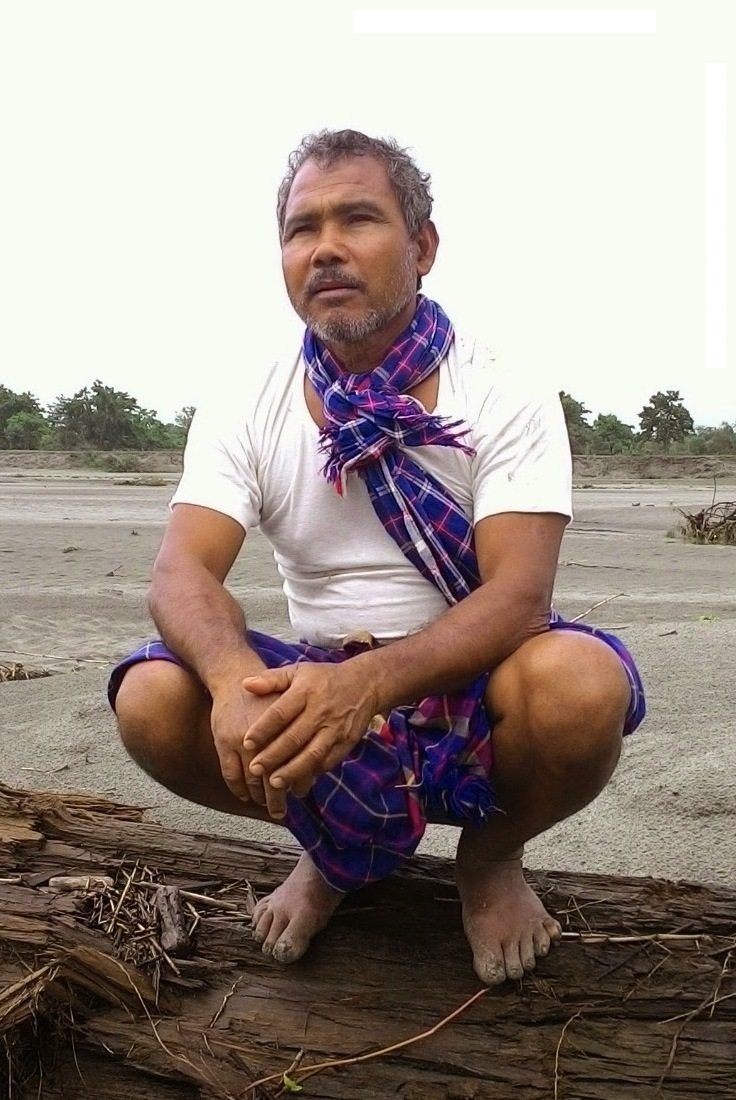
Jadav Molai Payeng, the man who planted the Molai Forest

Molai forest is named after environmental activist and forestry worker Jadav 'Molai' Payeng. After an initial 200 hectare (500 acre) planting by the social forestry division of Golaghat district was abandoned in 1983, the forest was single-handedly attended to by Payeng for 30 years and now encompasses an area of about 1,360 acres / 550 hectares. Payeng planted and tended trees on a sandbar of Majuli island in the Brahmaputra River, eventually becoming a forest reserve.

Molai forest now houses Bengal tigers, Indian rhinoceros, over 100 deer and rabbits besides monkeys and several varieties of birds, including a large number of vultures. There are several thousand trees, including valcol, arjun (Terminalia arjuna), Pride of India (Lagerstroemia speciosa), royal poinciana (Delonix regia), silk trees (Albizia procera), moj (Archidendron bigeminum) and cotton trees (Bombax ceiba). Bamboo covers an area of over 300 hectares (700 acres).

A herd of around 100 elephants regularly visits the forest every year and generally stays for around six months. They have given birth to 10 calves in the forest.

== Media ==
Molai forest and Payeng have been the subject of a number of documentaries. A locally made film documentary, produced by Jitu Kalita in 2012 The Molai Forest, was screened at the Jawaharlal Nehru University. Jitu Kalita, who lives near Payeng's house, has also featured and given recognition on his reporting of the life of Payeng through his documentary. Molai forest was also featured in a 2013 documentary Foresting life, directed by the Indian documentary filmmaker Aarti Shrivastava, and in William Douglas McMaster's 2013 film documentary Forest Man. People have pledged 8,327 USD on the Kickstarter campaign for the post-production of this documentary in early 2013, which was shown at 2014 Cannes Film Festival.
