= Garvi Gujarat Bhavan =

Government of Gujarat Guest house

- Interactive map of the Garvi Gujarat Bhavan area

General information
- Architectural style: Māru-Gurjara
- Location: 25/A, Akbar Road, New Delhi, Delhi, India
- Coordinates: 28.608069°N 77.222688°E
- Inaugurated: 2 September 2019
- Cost: ₹126.82 crore (US$15 million)
- Owner: Government of Gujarat

Technical details
- Floor area: 7,066 square Metres (Approx)

Design and construction
- Architecture firm: Design Associates Inc
- Main contractor: NBCC India Ltd

Garvi Gujarat Bhavan is the official Guest house of Government of Gujarat in Delhi. It has been built over 7,066 square meter plot on Akbar Road, New Delhi. It is also the first state guest house in capital to be certified as a Green building.

== The Building ==
Gravi Gujarat Bhavan has been built using Dhaulpur and Agra stones. The old Gujarat Bhavan is located on Kautilya Marg over a 1418 square meter plot. The structure is spread over an area of 7,066 square metres and The total cost of this complex is Rs. 131 crore. Gujarat Bhavan has about 78 differently themed guest rooms, distributed in seven storeys, which comprise 2 Presidential suites, 17 VIP suites, and 59 guest rooms.

This new Garvi Gujarat Bhavan is having following facility.

- 19 Suit Rooms
- 59 Rooms
- Restaurant
- Public Dining Hall
- Business Centre
- Souvenir Shop
- Multi-purpose hall
- Conference Hall
- Four Lounges
- Gymnasium
- Yoga Centre
- Terrace Garden
- Library.
