= Jadav Payeng =

Indian environmentalist (born 1959)

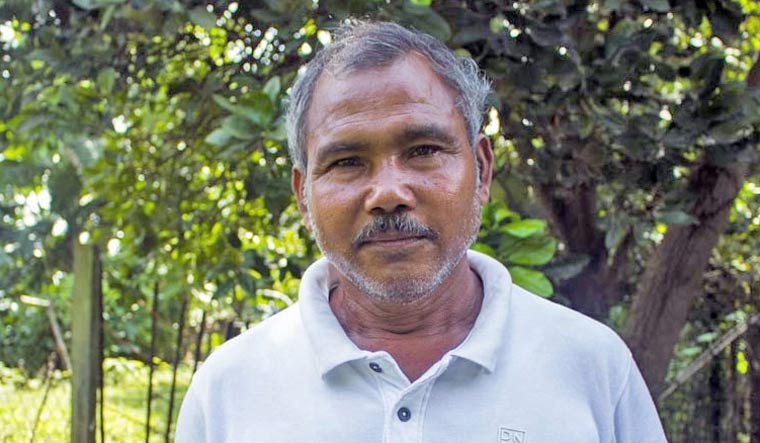
- Forest Man of India
- Born: Payeng; 31 October 1959 (age 66); Jorhat, Assam, India
- Other name: Molai
- Citizenship: Indian
- Occupation: Environmental Activist
- Years active: 1959
- Spouse: Binita
- Children: 3
- Awards: Padma Shri (2015)

Jadav "Molai" Payeng (born 31 October 1959) is a forest conservationist from Majuli, in the Indian state of Assam. He is popularly known as the Forest Man of India. Over the course of several decades, he has planted and tended trees on a sandbar of the river Brahmaputra turning it into a forest reserve. The forest, called Molai forest after him, is located near Kokilamukh of Jorhat, Assam, India and encompasses an area of about 1,360 acres (550 ha). In 2015, he was honoured with Padma Shri, the fourth highest civilian award in India. He was born in the indigenous Mising tribe of Assam.

== Career ==
In 1979, Payeng encountered a large number of snakes that had died due to excessive heat after floods washed them onto the tree-less sandbar. That is when he planted around 20 bamboo seedlings on the sandbar. He not only looked after the plants, but continued to plant more trees on his own, in an effort to transform the area into a forest.

The forest, which came to be known as Molai forest, now houses Bengal tigers, Indian rhinoceros, and over 100 deer and rabbits. Molai forest is also home to monkeys and several varieties of birds, including a large number of vultures. There are several thousand trees, including valcol, arjun (Terminalia arjuna), ejar (Lagerstroemia speciosa), goldmohur (Delonix regia), koroi (Albizia procera), moj (Archidendron bigeminum) and himolu (Bombax ceiba). Bamboo covers an area of over 300 hectares.

A herd of around 100 elephants regularly visits the forest every year and generally stays for around six months. They have given birth to 10 calves in the forest in recent years.

His efforts became known to the authorities in 2008, when forest department officials went to the area in search of 115 elephants that had retreated into the forest after damaging property in the village of Aruna Chapori, which is about 1.5 km from the forest. The officials were surprised to see such a large and dense forest and since then the department has regularly visited the site.

In 2013, poachers tried to kill the rhinos staying in the forest but failed in their attempt due to Molai who alerted department officials. Officials promptly seized various articles used by the poachers to trap the animals.

Molai is aiming to manage the forest in a better way and to go to other places of the state to start a similar venture. His goal is to spread his forest to another sand bar inside of Brahmaputra.

== Personal life ==
He belongs to the indigenous Mising Tribe which is located in Assam, India. He, along with wife and 3 children (1 daughter and 2 sons), used to live at the house which he had built inside his Forest. In 2012, Jadav built a house at No. 1 Mishing Gaon near Kokilmukh Ghat and shifted to this house with his family. Since then, they have been living in this house. Jadav, however, travels everyday to his Forest to tend and look after the plants and trees. He has cattle and buffalo on his farm and sells the milk for his livelihood, which is his only source of income. In an interview from 2012, he revealed that he has lost around 100 of his cows and buffaloes to the tigers in the forest, but blames the people who carry out large scale encroachment and destruction of forests as the root cause of the plight of wild animals.

== Honours ==
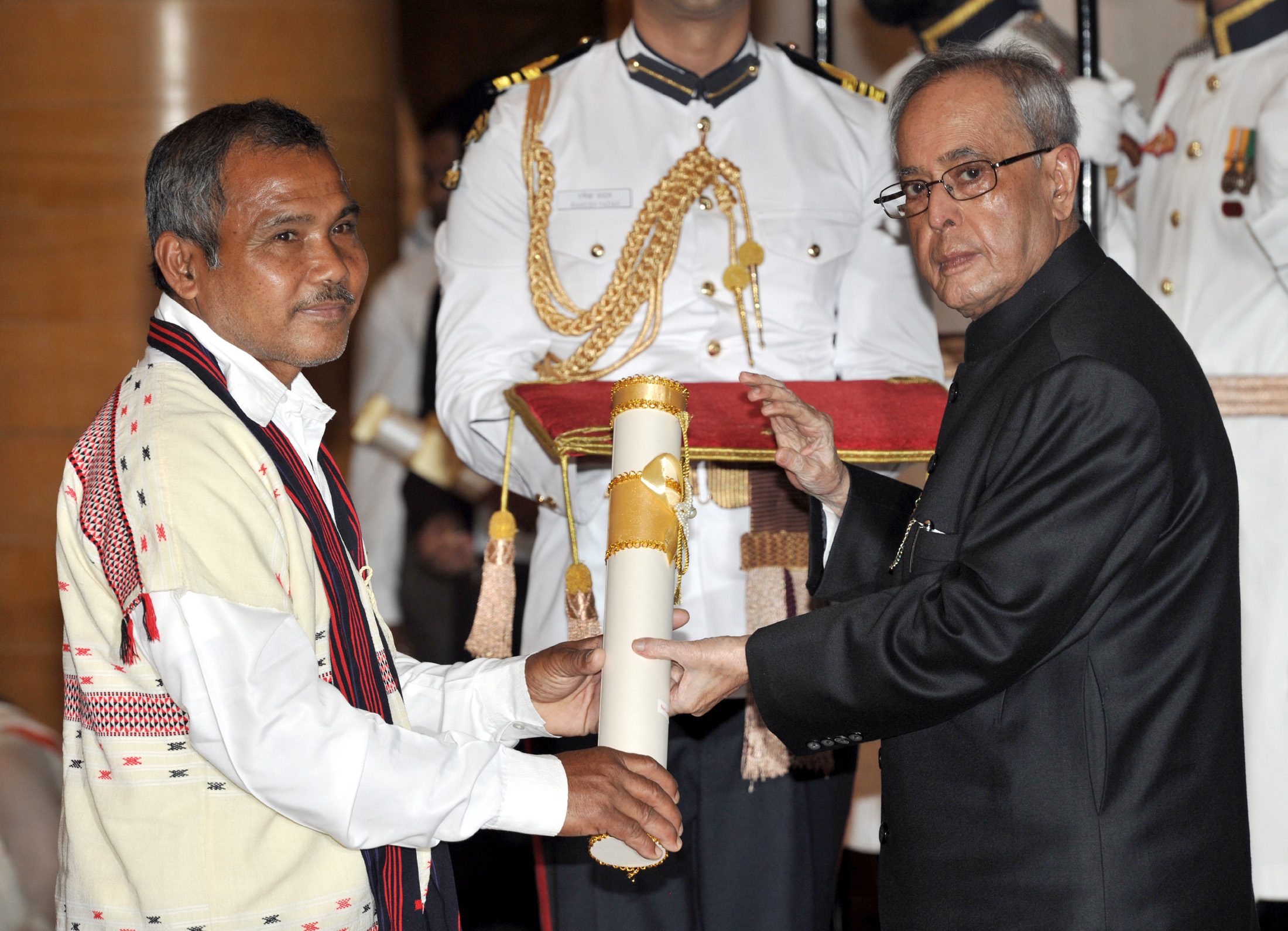
Jadav Payeng receiving Padma Shri award from President Pranab Mukherjee

Jadav Payeng was honoured at a public function arranged by the School of Environmental Sciences, Jawaharlal Nehru University on 22 April 2012 for his achievement. He shared his experience of creating a forest in an interactive session, where Magsaysay Award winner Rajendra Singh and JNU vice-chancellor Sudhir Kumar Sopory were present. Sopory named Jadav Payeng as the "Forest Man of India". In the month of October 2013, he was honoured at the Indian Institute of Forest Management during their annual event Coalescence. In 2015, he was honoured with Padma Shri, the fourth highest civilian award in India. He received honorary doctorate degree from Assam Agricultural University and Kaziranga University for his contributions.

Ribbon	Decoration	Country	Date	Note	Ref.
	Padma Shri	India	2015	The fourth-highest civilian honour of India.	

== In popular culture ==
Payeng has been the subject of a number of documentaries in the recent years. His character was the basis for a fictional film made by a Tamil director Prabhu Solomon casting Rana Daggubati released in Tamil, Telugu, Hindi as Kaadan, Aranya and Haathi Mere Saathi. A locally made documentary film, produced by Jitu Kalita in 2012, The Molai Forest, was screened at the Jawaharlal Nehru University. Jitu Kalita, who lives near Payeng's house, has also been featured and given recognition for good reporting by projecting the life of Payeng through his documentary.

The 2013 film documentary Foresting life, directed by the Indian documentary filmmaker Aarti Shrivastava, celebrates the life and work of Jadav Payeng in the Molai forest. These are also the focus of William Douglas McMaster's 2013 film documentary Forest Man. With US$8,327 pledged on its Kickstarter campaign, the film was brought to completion and taken to a number of film festivals. It was awarded the Best Documentary prize at the Emerging Filmmaker Showcase in the American Pavilion at the 2014 Cannes Film Festival.

Payeng is the subject of the 2016 children's book Jadav and the Tree-Place, written and illustrated by Vinayak Varma. The book was published by the open-source children's publishing platform StoryWeaver, and its production was funded by a grant from the Oracle Giving Initiative. Jadav and the Tree-Place has been translated into 39 languages, published in print by Pratham Books in 8 Indian languages, and has won the Digital Book of the Year prize at the Publishing Next Industry Awards, 2016, and the Best of Indian Children's Writing: Contemporary Awards, 2019.

Payeng is also the subject of the 2019 children's book The Boy Who Grew A Forest: The True Story of Jadav Payeng, written by Sophia Gholz and illustrated by Kayla Harren. Published by Sleeping Bear Press, the book won the Crystal Kite Award, the Sigurd F. Olson Nature Writing Award (SONWA) from Northland College, and the Florida State Book Award. It has been translated into German and French, and adapted for stage.

== See also ==
- Reforestation
- Tahir Qureshi
