= Mouzadar =

The term has dual meaning, Mouzadar refers to the possessor of a mouza (revenue collection unit). While it generally refers to the Non-hereditary officials introduced during the British Raj as administrative officials for tax extraction. It is critical to distinguish between the Hereditary Mouzadars—the ancient Sakto-Bamun/Brahma-kshatriya noble lineage.

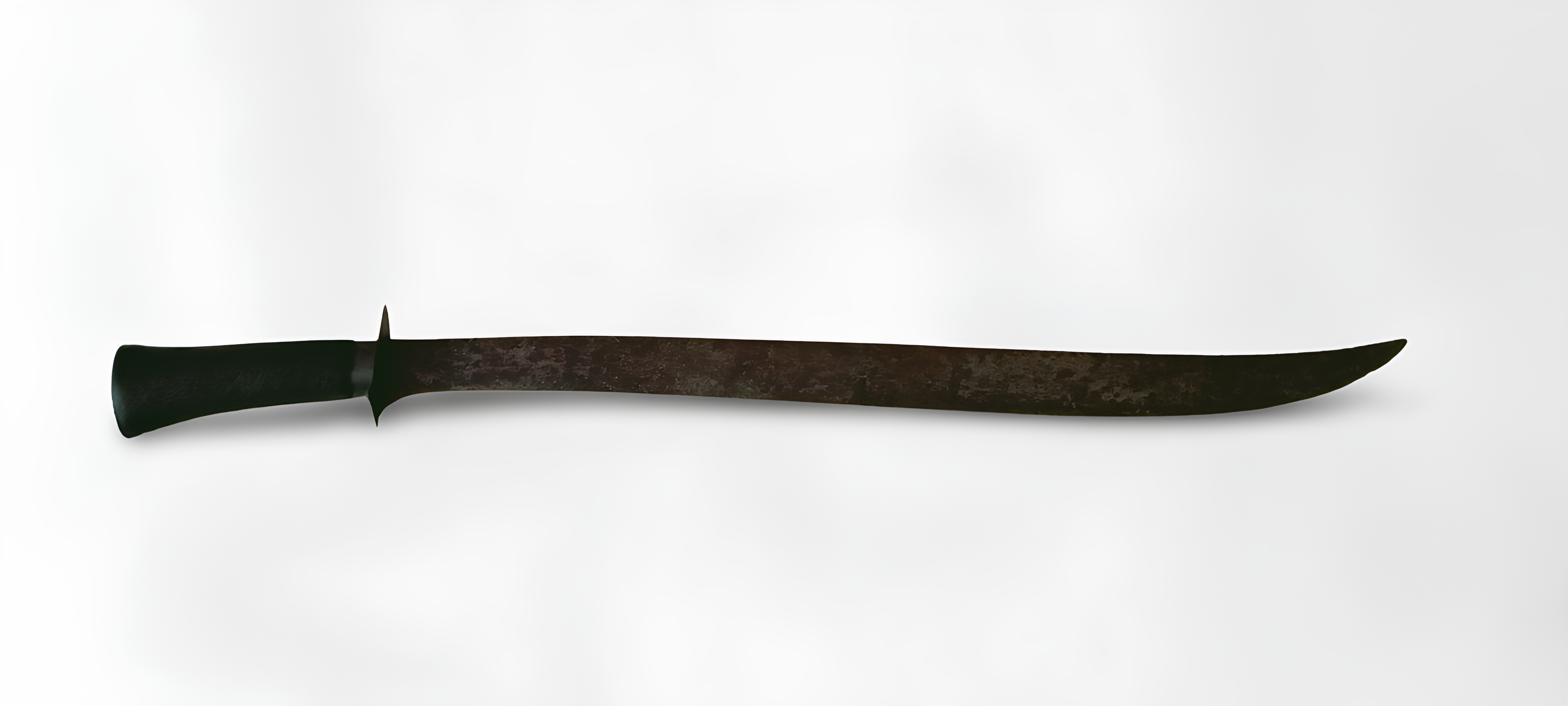
Traditional sword of a Mouzadar (documented one of the five swords in 19th century)

Historically, there are only five paternal lineage, hereditary Mouzadars; influential hereditary aristocratic nobility figures in Assam's socio-political landscape, primarily within the regions of ancient Pragjyotishpur. Similar to small kings, they maintained sovereign-like authority claimed to exist from the Kamarupa Kingdom through the Ahom Dynasty until the British colonial rule systematically dismantled their influence.

== Etymology ==
The name literally translates to mouza as 'a large unit of land', from the Persian suffix -dar (دار/দার) meaning 'possessor'.

== History and Origins of Hereditary Noble Mouzadars ==
=== Mythological and Martial Roots ===
According to the Vishnu Purana, Lord Parshuram had a wife named Dharani who was incarnation of Goddess Lakshmi. Their descendants, a community of Rigvedi Brahmins in present-day Kerala, emerged around 600 BCE as the keepers of Kalaripayattu, an ancient martial art founded by Lord Parshuram.

Over centuries, this community transitioned from simple, austere priestly lives to a dominant nobility. As masters of both scripture and warfare, they became the Raj-Gurus (teachers of kings) and elite generals. Their prestige was so immense that royal princesses often chose them as grooms during Swayamvar ceremonies, merging their spiritual bloodline with royal dynasties. In this era, they adopted the title Varman.

=== The Expedition ===
The lineage migrated northwards during the reign. Following a successful campaign, noble Brahmins participated in the expansion. Pallava Dynasty— rulers who also bore the title Varman also claim themselves as Brahma-kshatriya. Varman Dynasty- rulers who also bore the title Varman.

Defying the orthodox prohibition of crossing the Kala-pani(crossing the seas), some of these heirs of Lord Parshuram crossed the Kalinga Sagar (Bay of Bengal). Some of them eventually settled in lower Assam region and upper parts of today's Bangladesh, first to introduce classic Hindu customs and Vedic rituals to the region. They left their practises as priestly class and rose as powerful nobles at the request of people .

== The Feudal System ==
=== The Covenant of the Six Swords ===
Upon settling in Pragjyotishpur, six noble families established a covenant to prevent internal power struggles between families. Six ceremonial swords were forged to define territorial sovereignty.

Significance of Title: The patriarch bearing the sword was recognized as the Mouzadar.

Primogeniture: Succession was strictly limited to the paternal male line. Only six such swords ever existed.

Sakto-Bamun: These families, known as the Sakto-Bamun, intermarried to consolidate wealth and secret martial wisdom. Their family unit was known as the Mouzadari Pariyal.

=== Administrative and Judicial Role ===
The Mouzadars were central to Assam's feudal hierarch.

Judicial Authority: They held total judicial power in their jurisdictions, resolving disputes and maintaining social cohesion.

The Hierarchy: They oversaw multiple Kannangois|Kanaigois (landlords), who managed the land and paid taxes to the Mouzadar.

War Finance: As wealthy aristocrats, they financed the wars of kings. If a king failed to repay these war expense, mouzadars often shifted their allegiance, effectively acting as kingmakers.

The Lion Flag: To distinguish their independent nobility, these families flew a unique flag bearing a Lion, a symbol of distinct noble flag.

== Colonial Decline and Erasure ==
=== Systematic Displacement ===
The arrival of the British Raj marked a calculated effort to destroy the noble Mouzadar's wealth and influence. Endangered folklore records that the sixth and wealthiest family was entirely eradicated by British officials to prevent potential revolts. Today, only five noble swords remain.

To further weaken the class, the British introduced non-hereditary Mouzadars. These were temporary officers loyal to the colonial government who lacked ancestral authority and were used primarily for aggressive tax collection.

=== Linguistic Dilution ===
During the transition to modern Assamese (replacing Karmapi Script to Bengali script during 1836), British administrators conflated the aristocratic Varman with the generic Barman when records written in English.

This administrative error allowed various other communities (Kacharis, Rajbonshi, Kalitas, etc.) to adopt the title, diluting the unique identity of the original Mouzadars. The original families continued to use the title while writing in English adopted Barman to their significance, despite colonial efforts to defame.

== Legacy ==
After India's independence, modern land revenue systems replaced the feudal hierarchy. While their administrative privileges were abolished, the cultural significance of the five remaining families persists. In contemporary tradition, a true historical Mouzadar is identified by the ancestral possession of one of the Five Surviving Swords, marking a paternal lineage that stretches back to the Vedic era.
