= Budhindranath Delihial Bhattacharya =

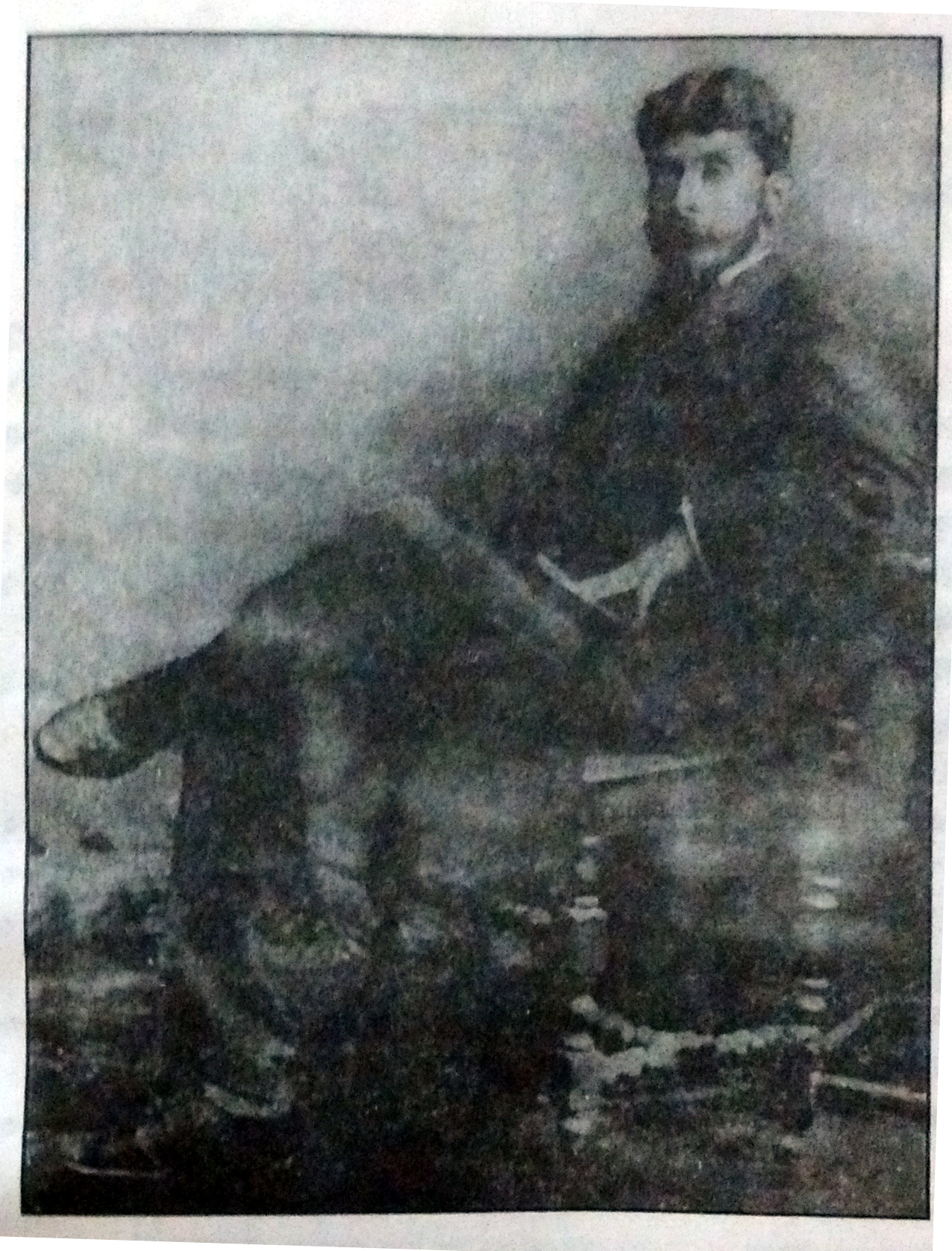
Author's description page photograph taken from the Pronouncing Anglo Assamese Dictionary, First Edition, published in 1931.

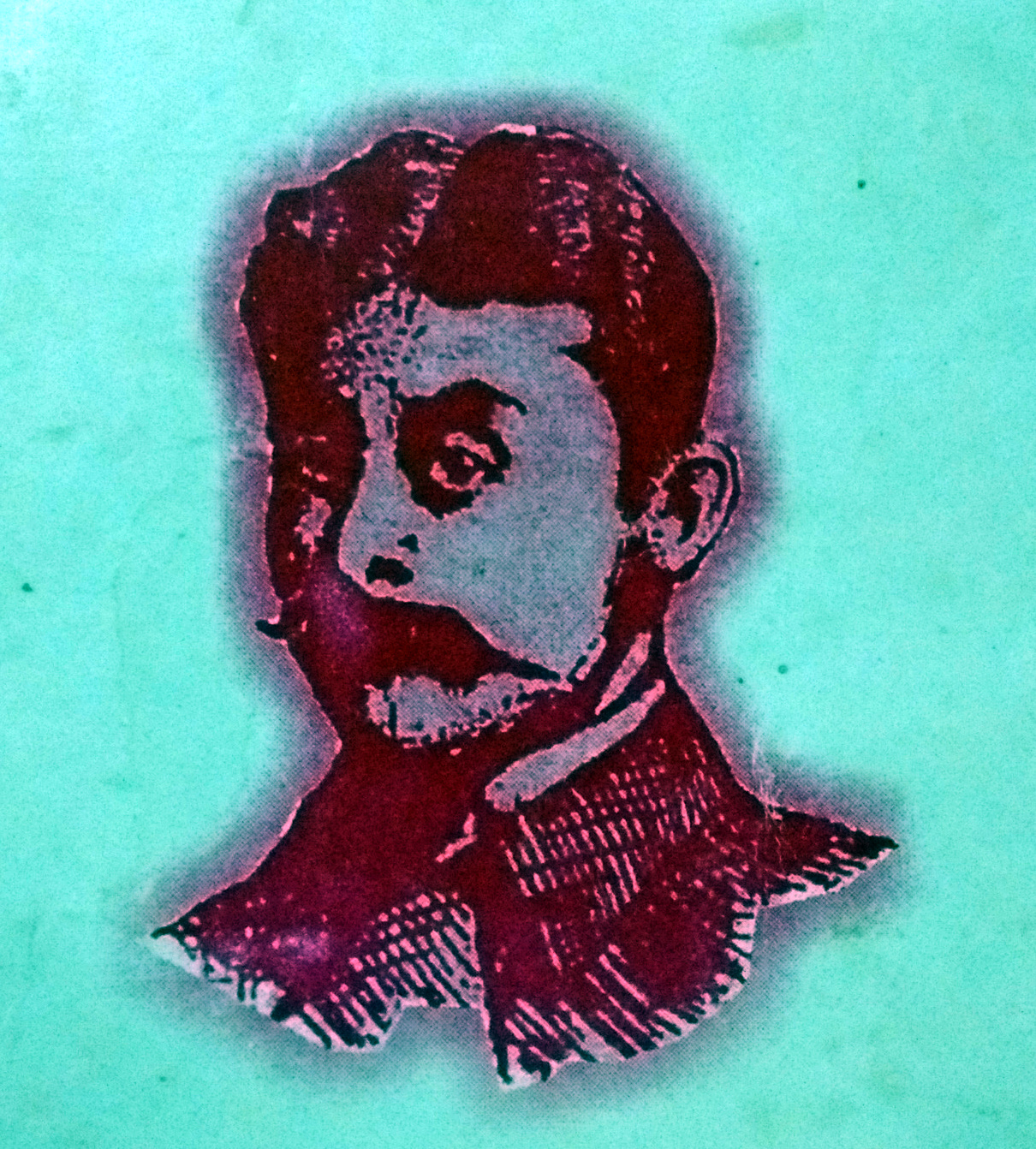
Portrait shot of Budhindranath Delihial Bhattacharya, published sometime between 1930 and 1940.

Budhindranath Delihial Bhattacharya (1865–1945), also known as Budhi Babu, Budhindra Nath Bhattacharya, is renowned for his work The Pronouncing Anglo Assamese Dictionaries, which was first published in 1931. He was also a tea planter of The Crown of England, which later came under the Governments of Assam & West Bengal.

== Early life and education ==
His father's name was Dharmadutta Bhattacharya, and his mother's name was Aai Keteki Devi, of Nowgong(Singia potani), Assam. Budhindranath left a volume of literary works as a dramatist, author, editor and lexicographer.

Budhindranath went to the Government High School, Nagaon, under the patronage of Rai Bahadur Gunabhiram Baruah. He was a talented student. In 1885, he passed the entrance examination and was admitted to the General Assembly Institution, nowadays called City College, Kolkata City College, where he earned a degree in fine arts. In Jaipur, he met Rai Bahadur Radhakanta Handique, Satyanath Bora, and other prominent personalities of pre-independent India who later became his close companions. Despite his talent, he had to leave his college education due to his family's financial situation.

== Career ==
On 28 July 1888, after arriving at Jorhaat, Budhindranath moved into a small cottage on the J. B. Road (Babu Ali), and began working as a schoolteacher at the Jorhaat Government High School. Later, he visited Dhaka, Shillong, and other places, before joining the Jorhat Court in 1893 as the Criminal Peskar. He was promoted to the position of head clerk on 17 November 1911 at the Office of the Deputy Commissioner in Jorhat. In 1894, he was given a piece of land by the Sattradhikar (head monk) of the Garmur Sattra, near Malow Ali, on which he built a home, completed in 1897. In 1890, he married Rukmini (Golapi), daughter of Gadadhar Sarmah Borthakur of the Matigarung family. The couple had five sons and three daughters.

Budhindranath visited England in 1902 as Raibahadur Jaggannath Baruah's secretary for Edward VII's coronation. His travelogue, Bilaat Jaatra, provides insights into Britain and pre-independent India, especially Assam, at the beginning of the 20th century.

== Later life ==
After his retirement in 1920, Budhindranath set up a small tea garden at Golaghat Dighalihula and started as an independent businessperson. In 1924, he was appointed valuer at the Golaghat Municipality Office. During this period, he was assigned as a government translator to the East Bengal & Assam Governments. His contributions to the cause of Assamese culture and literature during this period were given recognition. In addition to being one of the founding members of the Jorhat Theatre, he cared deeply about his country and Assamese literature in pre-independent India. He was also a member of the Society for the Progress of the Assamese Language. Under this, he contributed actively to the betterment of Assamese culture and society. Bhattacharya died at the age of 80.

== Notable works ==
Dramas:

- Romoni Gabhoru (1895)
- Pandav Parichay
- Chitrangada Milan
- Chengeli Gaonburah

Books:

- The Scientific Essence of Hindu Religion
- Bilaat Probaxhi Asomiya

Newspapers and magazines to which he contributed his writing:

- Times of Assam
- Advocate of Assam
- Assam Bilashini
- Indian Mirror
- National Guardian
- Amritbazar
- Jayanti
- Journal of the Assam Sahitya Sabha

Newspapers (with Sahityarathna Chandradhar Baruah):

- Darpan

Dictionary:

- The Pronouncing Anglo Assamese Dictionary (First Edition, 14 October 1931)
