= List of cities in Assam by population =

This is a list of urban agglomerations with populations above 100,000 and cities (not part of urban agglomerations) with populations of less than or equal to 100,000, as per 2011 census in the Indian state of Assam.

== List of cities by population ==
Locations of urban agglomerations / cities having population of 1 lakh in Assam.
^{‡}Largest metropolitan area administered by a municipal corporation.

This is a list of urban agglomerations / cities having populations of 1 lakh and above in the Indian state of Assam.

Urban agglomerations / cities having population 1 lakh and above
#	Name	Government	District	Type*	Population 2011	Male	Female	Population below 5 yrs	Literacy rate
1	Guwahati	Municipal corporation	Kamrup Metropolitan	UA	968,549	505,542	463,007	43,537	91.19
2	Jorhat	Municipal board	Jorhat	UA	229,136	165,497	143,639	22,976	91.42
3	Dibrugarh	Municipal Corporation	Dibrugarh	UA	154,296	80,757	71,539	14,314	89.19
4	Silchar	Municipal Corporation	Silchar	UA	157,889	88,896	84993	21,873	85.15
5	Nagaon	Municipal board	Nagaon	UA	149,345	76,445	72,900	17,776	89.75
6	Tinsukia	Municipal board	Tinsukia	UA	126,505	64,313	62,192	10,835	89.17
*UA=Urban agglomeration

== Urban agglomeration ==
In the census of India 2011, an urban agglomeration was defined as follows:

"An urban agglomeration is a continuous urban spread constituting a town and its adjoining outgrowths (OGs), or two or more physically contiguous towns together with or without outgrowths of such towns. An Urban Agglomeration must consist of at least a statutory town and its total population (i.e. all the constituents put together) should not be less than 20,000 as per the 2001 Census. In varying local conditions, there were similar other combinations which have been treated as urban agglomerations satisfying the basic condition of contiguity."

=== Constituents of urban agglomerations in Assam ===
The recorded urban agglomerations of Assam, with a population of 1 lakh or above, are noted below.

- Guwahati: Guwahati (M.Corp) and Narengi (OG).
- Jorhat: Jorhat (M.B), Chengeli Gaon (OG), Gohain Tekela Gaon (OG), Duliagaon (OG), Cinnamara Grant (OG), Toklai Chah Bagicha (OG), Sarbaibandha (OG), Chowdang No.1 (OG), Bohotia Gaon (OG), Sonari Gaon (OG), Kamalabaria Gaon (OG), Nakari Bamun Gaon (OG), Barbheta Chapari (OG), Kamalabaria N.C.(C.T), Kumar kaibarta Gaon (C.T) and Chekonidhara (C.T).
- Silchar: Silchar (M.Crop), Silchar XI (OG), Tarapur VIII (OG), Tarapur VII (C.T), Kanakpur I (C.T), Ambicapur Part–X (C.T), Silchar Part–X (C.T), Uttar Krishnapur Part–I (C.T) and Kanakpur Part–II (C.T).
- Dibrugarh: Dibrugarh (M.Corp), Mahpowalimara Gohain Gaon (OG), Tekela Chiring Gaon (OG), Niz–Mankata (C.T) and Barbari (AMC area) (C.T).
- Nagaon: Nagaon (M.B), Chota Haibor (C.T), Dimaruguri (C.T), Morongial (C.T), Kachalukhowa (OG), Nartam Gaon (OG).
- Tinsukia: Tinsukia (M.B), Lahari Kachari Gaon (OG), Hengaluguri Gaon (OG), Bajatoli Gaon (OG), Hijuguri Gaon (OG), Tinsukia Town 24 No. Sheet (OG) – Ward No. 20, Kachujan Gaon (C.T) and Bahbari Gaon (C.T).
- Tezpur: Tezpur (M.B), Bamun Chuburi Gaon (OG), Dekar Gaon (OG), Prabatia Gaon (OG), Hazarpar Dekar Gaon (OG), Deuri Gaon (OG), Barika Chuburi (C.T), Majgaon (C.T) and Gutlong Gaon (C.T).

== List of municipal areas in Assam ==
A list of municipal areas based on population classes I – III, and IV and IV+ as per Ministry of Urban Development, Government of India are tabulated below.

Population rank	Name	Type	Class	District	Population	Growth rate in %
1st	^{†}Guwahati	IC	M.Corp	Kamrup Metro	968,549	91.12
2nd	^{†}Jorhat	IC	M.B	Jorhat	229,136	91.42
3rd	^{†}Dibrugarh	IC	M.Corp	Dibrugarh	154,296	89.15
4th	^{†}Silchar	IC	M.Corp	Cachar	157,889	88.15
5th	^{†}Nagaon	IC	M.B	Nagaon	142,736	87.82
6th	Tinsukia	IC	M.B	Tinsukia	126,389	89.65
7th	^{†}Tezpur	IC	M.B	Sonitpur	102,505	82.01
8th	Bongaigaon	II	M.B	Bongaigaon	93,650	56.42
9th	Diphu	II	M.B	Karbi Anglong	63,654	18.02
10th	^{†}Dhubri	II	M.B	Dhubri	63,388	79.51
11th	North Lakhimpur	II	M.B	Lakhimpur	59,793	09.03
12th	Sribhumi	II	M.B	Sribhumi	57,585	09.01
13th	Sivasagar	II	M.B	Sivasagar	55,595	07.07
14th	^{†}Goalpara	III	M.B	Goalpara	53,455	08.05
15th	Barpeta Town	III	M.B	Barpeta	43,663	03.05
16th	^{†}Golaghat	III	M.B	Golaghat	42,991	21.04
17th	Haflong	III	M.B	Dima Hasao	42,972	16.04
18th	Rangiya	III	M.B	Kamrup	40,216	14.0
19th	Mangaldai	III	M.B	Darrang region	36,993	56.12
20th	Tangla	III	M.B	Udalguri	35,244	56.00
21st	Lanka	III	M.B	Nagaon	36,803	06.06
22nd	Hojai	III	M.B	Nagaon	36,544	02.02
23rd	Barpeta Road	III	M.B	Barpeta	35,281	00.06
24th	Kokrajhar	III	M.B	Kokrajhar	34,202	08.09
25th	Hailakandi	III	M.B	Hailakandi	33,671	12.10
26th	Morigaon	III	M.B	Morigaon	29,182	28.07
27th	Nalbari	III	M.B	Nalbari	27,608	16.0
26th	Silapathar	III	M.B	Dhemaji	25,662	14.00
29th	Dhekiajuli	III	M.B	Sonitpur	21,375	07.06
30th	Dergaon	IV	M.B	Golaghat	20,097	33.05
31st	Sonari	IV+	M.B	Charaideo	19,792	11.09
32nd	Kharupetia	IV+	M.B	Darrang region	18,501	9.82
33rd	Nazira	IV+	M.B	Sivasagar	13,299	06.03
34th	Lakhipur	IV+	C.T	Cachar	10,943	8.0
(Italic text cities are also urban agglomerations). M.Corp: Municipal corporation M.B: Municipal board C.T: Census town^{†} Are oldest, classified and prominent, and constantly inhabited, recognised urban centres based on the earliest years of formation of the civic bodies, before the Indian independence of 1947.
