= Amulya Barua =

Assamese poet

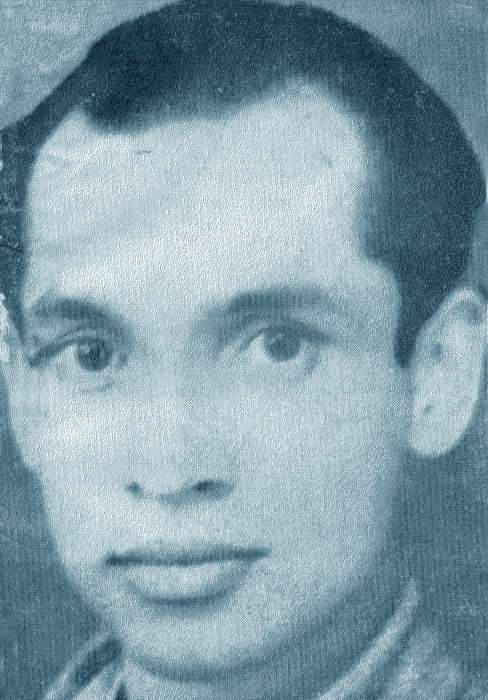
- Born: 30 June 1922; Jorhat, Assam Province, British Raj
- Died: 18 August 1946 (aged 24); Calcutta
- Occupation: poet
- Writing career
- Language: Assamese

Amulya Barua (30 June, 1922-18 August, 1946) was a pioneer of modern Assamese poetry. He was born at Jorhat on 30 June 1922.

== Life ==
In 1941, he passed matriculation examination from Jorhat Govt. Boys' H.S and M.P. School with letter marks in Assamese and got himself admitted into the prestigious Cotton College at Guwahati. But unavoidable domestic problem compelled him to return home and he took admission into JB College at Jorhat. In 1945 he passed his B.A. examination from Jagannath Barooah College, Jorhat. Then he went to Calcutta for higher studies and admitted into the MA class of Calcutta University. Barua was killed in the infamous communal violence of Bengal in 1946 along with many of his hostel mates at Raja Ram Narayan Street, Calcutta.

An idealist of the highest order, he expressed his deepest sympathy in his poetry for the oppressed and downtrodden masses of the society. Koyla, Kukur, Biplabi, Aji Amar Bihu, Bharatir Muktir Swapna etc. bore testimony to his revolutionary sentiment in clear terms. Beishya is a psychological analysis of the eternal tragedy of human life. The poem created ripples in Assamese literary world just after its publication in Jayanti. But many critics appreciated it and called him as Garcia Lorca of Assam.

His only collection of poems, Achina (The Stranger), was published in 1964 after his death. Some of his famous poems include Andhaaraor Hahakar (The Tumult of Darkness), Beishya (The Prostitute), Biplobi (The Revolutionary) and Kukur (The Dog).

== See also ==
- List of Indian poets
- Assamese literature
