= Ananda Chandra Dutta =

Indian botanist (1923-2016)

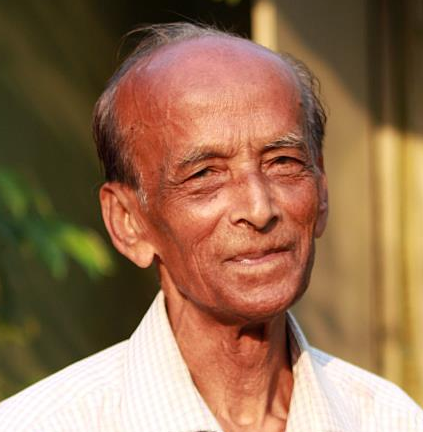
- Born: 8 February 1923; Chekonidhara, Jorhat, Assam
- Died: 16 January 2016 (aged 92); Jorhat, Assam, India
- Citizenship: Indian
- Occupation: Botanist

Ananda Chandra Dutta (8 February 1923 – 16 January 2016) was an Indian botanist of Assam. He was born at Chekonidhara village of Jorhat. He started his career as a teacher in Mariani Middle English High School in 1944–45 and then joined the Tocklai Tea Research Institute in 1947. Dutta played a major role in the establishment of a tea museum at Jorhat in 1977. He has also prepared a list of 10,000 trees for the Tocklai herbarium. He was awarded Degree of Doctor of Science by Dibrugarh University. He died on 16 January 2016 at his own residence in Jorhat.

== Life and work ==
1. Started his career in 1944–45 as a teacher at Mariani ME School .
2. On 8 February 1947 he joined at Tocklai Experimental Station as Junior Scientific Assistant and retired on 31 March 1983.
3. Appointed in Assam Agricultural University as Audio Visual Aid Assistant on 1 April 1983 & continued till Dec 1986.
4. Appointed as Photographer at Titabor Sericulture farm for one year (1987–88).
5. Established a full-fledged Tea Museum at Tocklai Experimental station.
6. Reappointed at Tocklai Experimental Station for one year (1990–91) to prepare the Herbarium Index.
7. Appointed as Manager of Gymkhana Club, Jorhat from Aug 1991 to April 1994.

== Expertise ==
1. Resource person as Plant Identifier.
2. Tea taxonomy & related works.
3. Tea Morphology, anatomy, cytology etc.

== Published books ==
1. Some Common Weeds of the T.E. in NE India.
2. Some Shade Trees, Green crop & Cover Crop Plants in the T.E. of N.E. India.
3. Photography (1980) : This is the first book about photography published in Assamese language.
4. Dictionary of Economic and Medical Plants (1985)
5. Bonoushdhir Goon Aaru Rug Arugyo (2003) (in Assamese)
6. Asomor Gos Gosoni (1st Part) (in Assamese)
7. Udbhid Upadan (2004)(1st Part) (in Assamese)
