= Fatehpur Talratoy =

- Village
- Location in Uttar Pradesh, India Fatehpur Talratoy (India)
- Coordinates: 26.134370°N 83.703954°E
- Country: India
- State: Uttar Pradesh
- District: Mau
- Tehsil: Madhuban

Government
  - Type: Panchayati raj (India)
  - Body: Gram panchayat

Languages
  - Official: Hindi
  - Other spoken: [[URDU language|Bhojpuri]]
- Time zone: UTC+5:30 (IST)
- Pin code: 221603
- Telephone code: 05464
- Vehicle registration: UP-54
- Website: up.gov.in

Fatehpur Talratoy is a village located in Madhuban tehsil of Mau district in Uttar Pradesh, India. It had 196 families and a population of 1324 in the 2021 census.

== Administration ==
Fatehpur Talratoy village is administrated by Pradhan who is elected representative of village as per constitution of India and Panchyati Raj Act.

Particulars	Total	Male	Female
Total No. of Houses	196		
Population	1324	668	656
