= Dipankar Vidyapith =

Coordinates: 26.7636°N 94.2068°E

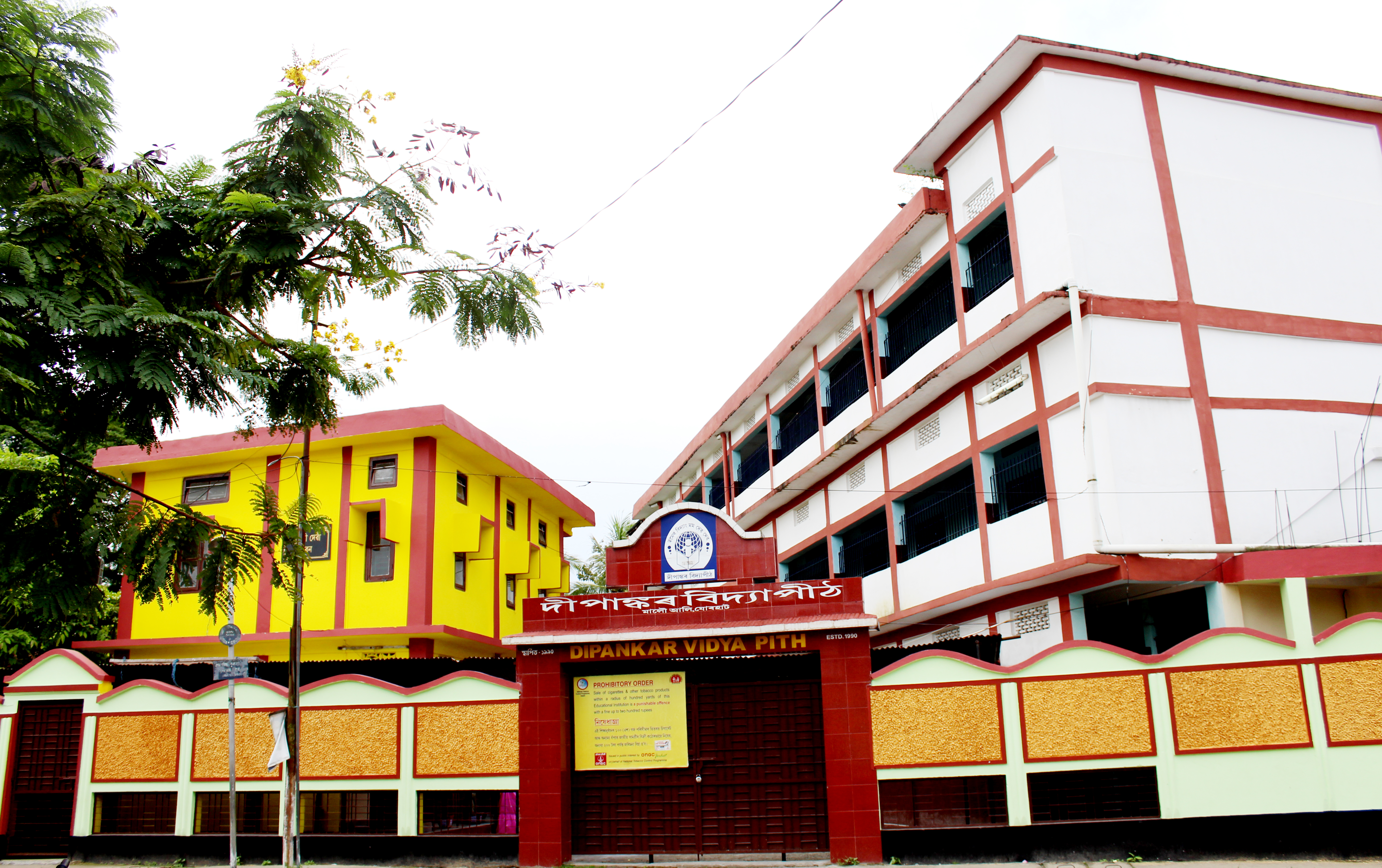
- Malow Ali, Jorhat, Assam; India

Information
- Type: Private
- Established: 1990
- School district: Jorhat
- Principal: Mrs Nandini Siddhanta
- Campus: Urban
- Affiliations: SEBA

Dipankar Vidyapith is an Assamese medium private school in Jorhat, India. It is located near Malow Ali in the centre of Jorhat. There are 30 staff and more than 600 students. The languages of instruction are Assamese and English. Students of Dipankar Vidyapith take the High School Leaving Certificate (class 10 exam) under the Board of Secondary Education, Assam.

== History ==
The school was established by Suruchi Devi, in the name of her grandson Dipankar who died at an early age. She donated her land and formed the Dipankar Vidyapith Trust Committee, which established the school and has managed it since then. The school started classes in 1990 with 50 students in the first year, under headteacher Kiran Phukan. The current president of the trust is Dr. Paresh Chandra Bora, and the principal is Parthasarathi Baruah. The school celebrated its silver jubilee in 2015.
