= Madhuban =

Jorhat municipality Board, Assam, India

Madhuban is a small area of Jorhat City and is under Jorhat municipality Board, Assam, India. The only road that passes through Madhubon is the Madhuban Path. It connects two important roads of Jorhat; Malow Ali and Choladhara road. Madhuban is about 1.5 km far from the ASTC Bus Station, Jorhat and Jorhat Court.

== Notable temples ==
=== Shitalanatha Temple ===
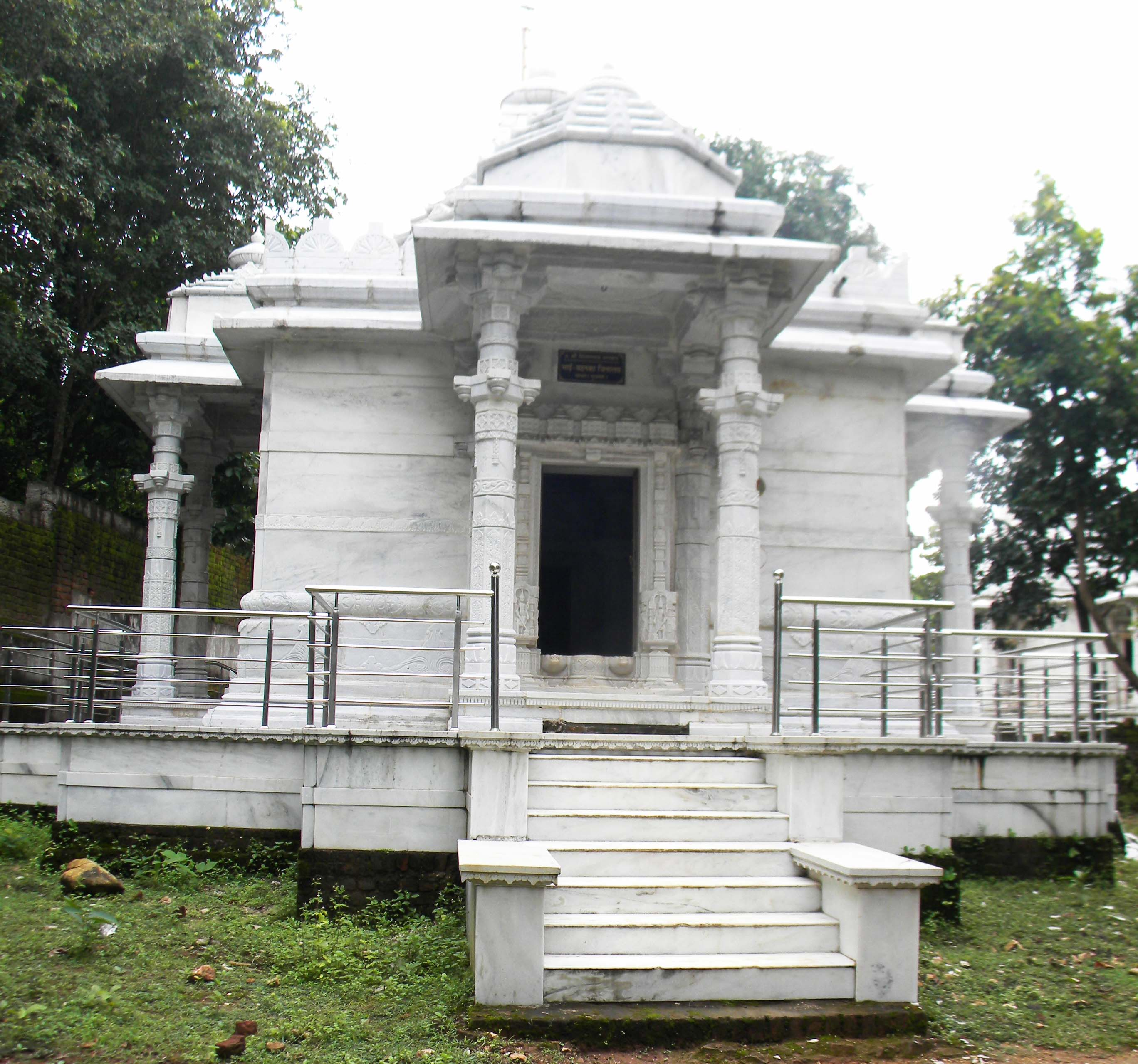
Shitalanatha Temple

This temple is dedicated to Shitalanatha, tenth tirthankar of Jainism.

=== Padmaprabha Temple ===
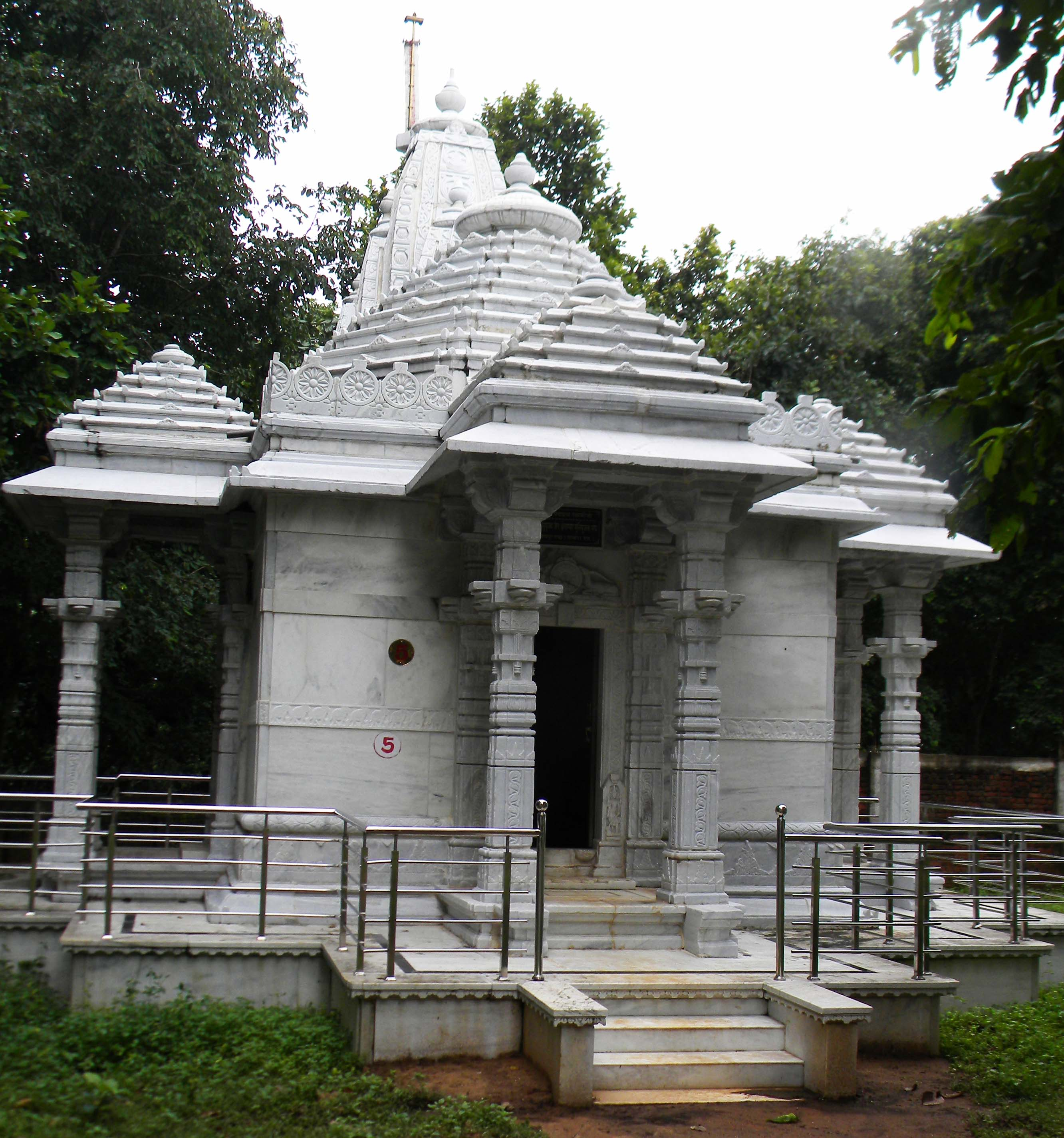
Padmaprabha Temple

This temple is dedicated to Padmaprabha, sixth tirthankar of Jainism. Moolnayak of this temple is a black colored idol of Padmaprabha.
