= Jagannath Barooah =

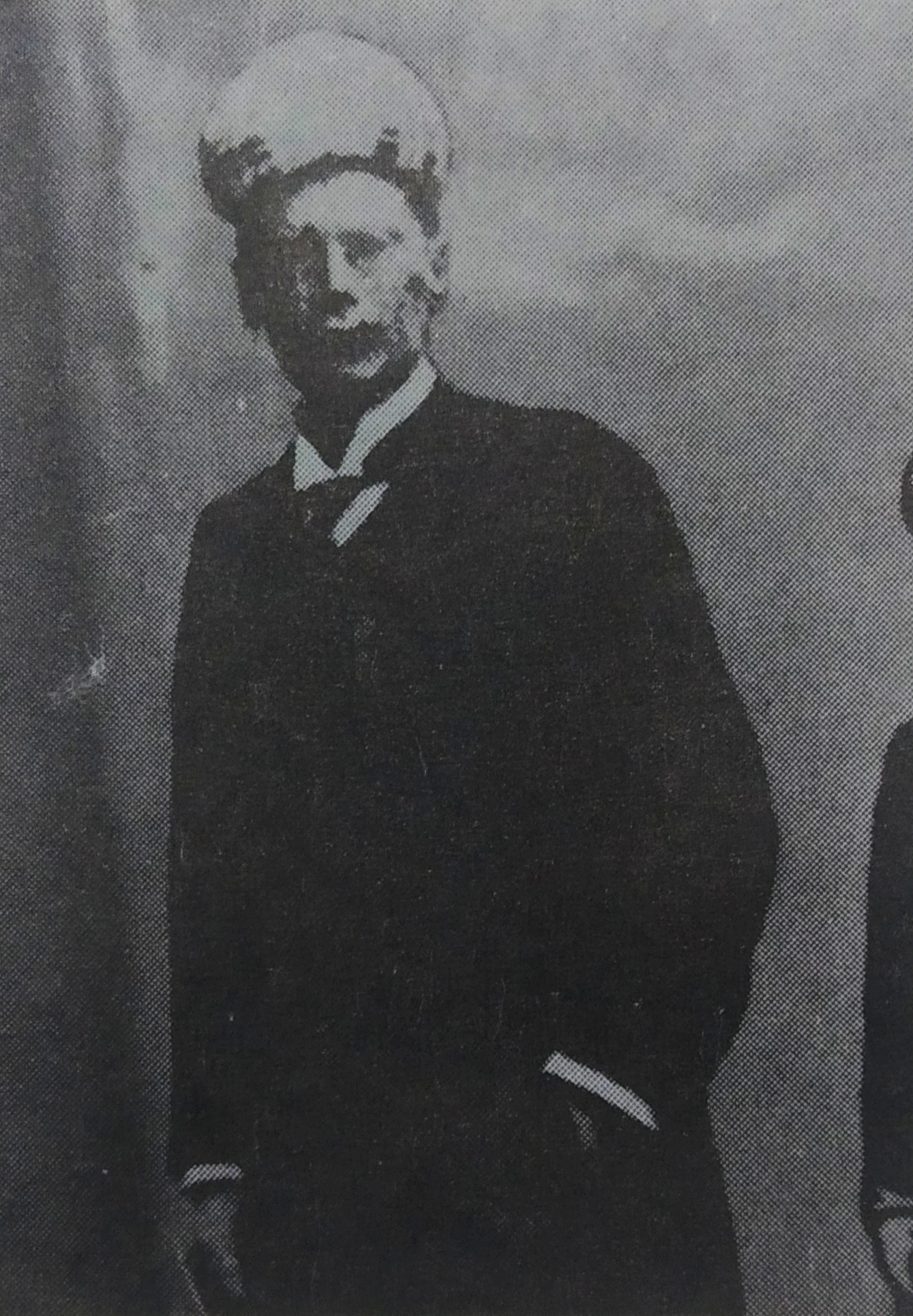
- Born: 29 October 1851; Rajhauli, Jorhat
- Died: 21 April 1907 (aged 55); Calcutta
- Education: Presidency University, Kolkata
- Occupations: Scholar, tea planter
- Organization: Jorhat Sarbajanik Sabha
- Father: Hemadhar Barooah

Jagannath Barooah (1851–1907) is an Indian scholar, tea planter, philanthropist from Jorhat, Assam. He is known as the first graduate from upper Assam.

== Early life ==
He was born on 29 October 1851 in Rajhauli, Jorhat, to Hemadhar Barooah.

== Education ==
He studied Sanskrit in his fathers guidance and later got into Guwahati English Seminary in 1864. He passed Bachelor of Arts from Presidency University, Kolkata in 1872. As he became the first graduate and upper Assam, people used to call him "B.A. Jagannath".

== Work ==
After returning from Calcutta, Jagannath Barooah appeared successfully for the Native Civil Services in 1875.But some spark of an independent spirit made him pass up a coveted carrier in favour of Asaam Tea Cultivation.

=== Tea Estates ===
- Letekujan tea estate
- Tipomia tea estate
- Bosabari tea estate

=== Jorhat Sarbajanik Sabha ===
He was the founder of Social-Political organisation Jorhat Sarbajanik Sabha in 1884, who later played a major role in Independence of India.

== Personal life ==
His first wife was Lilawati. They had two children together Swarnasachi and Devendranath. After the death of Lilawati, he married Troilokeshwari.

== Honours ==
The British conferred upon him the title "Raibahadur" in 1902. The Assam Pride Jagannath Barooah College at Jorhat was named after him as an honour. The college was established in his cottage "Borpatra kutir" in 1930.

== Death ==
Jagannath Barooah went to Calcutta for a health check up in February 1907. He died there on 21 April after two months.

== See also ==
- Jagannath Barooah College
