= HRH The Prince of Wales Institute of Engineering and Technology =

- Motto: Work is Worship
- Type: Public
- Established: c. 1927; 99 years ago
- Affiliations: State Council for Technical Education, Assam; All India Council for Technical Education
- Principal: Gautam Dutta
- Location: Jorhat, Assam, India; 26.7533°N 94.2174°E
- Campus: Urban
- Acronym: POWIET
- Website: powietjrt.in

HRH The Prince of Wales Institute of Engineering and Technology is a technical institute of Assam, and was established in 1927 by the British Government. It is the first engineering institute established in India's North Eastern Region.

== History ==
The Institute was established in 1927 with a financial aid from Assamese timber merchant Bholanath Boruah, that was given to British Government in 1922 for establishing a technical school in the name of the 'Prince of Wales' at Jorhat. The institute was founded the following year on 16 January 1928. A four-year certificate course in civil engineering was introduced in 1948. Since 1957, three-year diploma courses have been introduced in the Electrical and Mechanical Engineering Departments in addition to the Civil Engineering Department. In 1976 & 1978 respectively, courses in automotive and agricultural engineering began. Electronic & telecommunications engineering and instrumentation technology programs were later introduced in 1986. The Institution was known as the 'War Technical School' during the time of the Second World War. Since then numerous luminaries have enrolled in the Institution. National Award Winning Film Producer and Successful Industrialist Paran Barbarooah also completed his diploma from The Institute.

== Academic ==
The Institute offers three-year diploma courses in civil engineering, electrical engineering, mechanical engineering, agricultural engineering, Mechanical(Automobile) engineering , electronics & telecommunications engineering and instrumentation engineering. All courses are affiliated to the State Council of Technical Education, Assam under the Director of Technical Education, Assam. Admission to these courses is based on the Polytechnic Admission Test (PAT) conducted by the Director of Technical Education, Assam.

=== Departments ===
- Department of Civil Engineering
- Department of Electrical Engineering
- Department of Mechanical Engineering
- Department of Agricultural Engineering
- Department of Mechanical (Automobile) Engineering
- Department of Electronics & Telecommunications Engineering
- Department of Instrumentation Engineering
- Department of Physics
- Department of Chemistry
- Department of Mathematics
- Department of Humanities
- Workshop Departments
