= Ranjit Barthakur =

Indian businessman

- Born: 8 August 1954 (age 72); Jorhat, Assam, India
- Occupations: Chairman of Globally Managed Services (GMS) Executive Chairman, Rajasthan Royals
- Spouse: Radhika Barthakur

Ranjit Barthakur is an Indian businessman, from Jorhat, Assam. He is the Executive Chairman of Royal Multisport Pvt. Ltd., the company that owns the Indian Premier League team, Rajasthan Royals. Barthakur is married to Radhika Barthakur of the Nehru-Gandhi family of India. He was appointed Advisor to the Chief Minister of Assam under the Congress Government. He was asked to resign when the BJP Government came to power in 2016.

Barthakur is a part time writer in different topics in a Guwahati based website The Guwahati.

== Political aspirations ==
In 2001, the Assam Government appointed Barthakur as an advisor for strategy, action planning, project formulation, investment initiation and image building exercise for the state of Assam. He was appointed again in 2011. His term with the State Government as an advisor to the Chief Minister of Assam ended in 2016 when the Bharatiya Janata Party replaced the Tarun Gogoi led Congress Government.

In 2013, he was shortlisted by the then chief minister of Assam Tarun Gogoi for a Rajya Sabha MP seat from Assam. Barthakur was billed a 'dark horse' to win the election, especially as he was supported by dissident factions of the then Congress led by current BJP minister Himanta Biswa Sarma.

Santiuse Kujur was ultimately elected as Rajya Sabha Member.

== IPL controversy ==
Ranjit Barthakur is the executive chairman of the Rajasthan Royals, the inaugural champions of the Indian Premier League. In 2010, the BCCI showed that tender norms were violated by the franchise. Ranjit Barthakur and Fraser Castellino were the only two shareholders of the Rajasthan Royals franchise, completely unknown to the BCCI at the time. Justice BN Srikrishna, arbitrator on the case, suggested that the composition and ownership was known to the BCCI while communicating with the franchise. BCCI made strong claims that no documentation was provided to suggest connections between bidder and company. As a result, Rajasthan Royals were fined rupees 100 crore by the Enforcement Directorate of India, whilst an out of court settlement between the franchise and BCCI ensued.

Rajasthan Royals was then banned for two years following a match-fixing controversy.

The franchise is currently owned by Royal Multisport Pvt. Ltd., formerly known as Jaipur IPL Cricket Pvt. Ltd. Articles clearly state that payments "were not received in accordance with regulations. The company approached FIPB repeatedly, but their claims were rejected. Ranjit Barthakur and Fraser Castellino held 5,000 shares each in Jaipur IPL. The shares were then sold to EM Sporting Holdings Ltd. Mauritius, and Emerging Media, UK, at par value"

Barthakur was close to Lalit Modi, and he declared that 'Modi has given excellent business model in IPL'

Publicly available documents, released by Lalit Modi from his website mentioned Barthakur's role in arranging meetings through his Indian National Congress connections.

== Other work and entrepreneurship ==
A serial entrepreneur.

Ranjit joined the Board of Mount Everest Mineral Water Limited as an Independent Director in September 2008. He also serves as an advisor to several Government and Private Enterprises in pursuit of healthcare services, environmental issues, tourism and social transformation.

== Social entrepreneurship ==
Ranjit is on the management board of several corporate, institutions and social organizations both in India and abroad including those of Max Healthcare, Anand Group, Airtel, Hutchison Max-Touch Telecom (Vodafone), Marconi and ITC. He is also a Trustee of Tata Eastern Medical Trust, striving towards Cancer cure.
