= Don Bosco Higher Secondary School, Baghchung =

Coordinates: 26°42′59.4″N 94°12′38.8″E

- Baghchung, Na-Ali; Jorhat, Assam 785008; India

Information
- Type: Private
- Motto: Virtue and Knowledge
- Established: c1986
- Principal: Fr. Angel Kuldeep SDB
- Grades: Nursery-12
- Houses: Red, Green, Blue, Yellow
- Affiliation: Assam State School Education Board
- Website: https://www.dbsjorhat.in/

Don Bosco Higher Secondary School, Baghchung is a Catholic and minority Educational Institutions run by the Salesians of Don Bosco of Dimapur Province. It is a registered body under the Societies Registration Act 1860, and has its Regional Office at Don Bosco Provincial House, Dimapur, Nagaland.

The school follows the educational system developed and advocated by St. John Bosco, a renowned educator of youth.

It is the first school in Northeast India to completely power itself with solar energy. The initiative was undertaken with funds allotted by the former chief minister of Assam, Tarun Gogoi. The idea was floated in 2014 and implementation began in 2015, as part of the year-long birth bicentenary celebrations of John Bosco

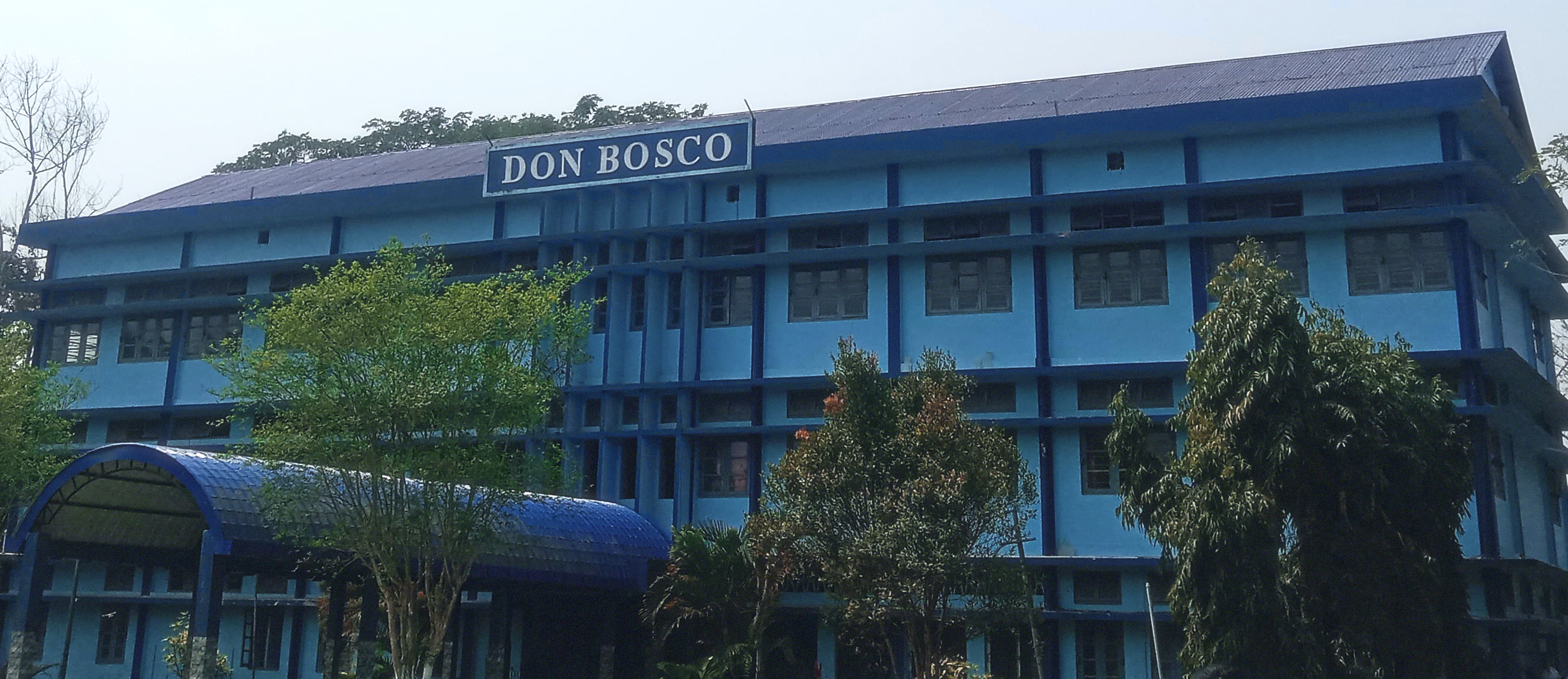
Front building of DBHSS-Baghchung

== Location ==
Don Bosco High School, Baghchung, is located about 5.5 km from Jorhat Town on Jorhat - Titabor road (SH32).

== Academics ==
Don Bosco Higher Secondary School, Baghchung, Jorhat is a school recognised by the Assam State School Education Board (ASSEB). As of 2025, the school conducts classes from Nursery to Class 12 and follows the state curricula and yearly planner. For Classes 11 and 12, students can choose between the Science and Arts streams.

Subjects that are taught in the school include English, Assamese, Social Studies, Science, Mathematics, Advanced Mathematics, Computer Science, Geography, History, Moral Science, General Knowledge, Music and Hindi. Additionally, there are subjects like Abacus and Vedic Maths.

=== Collaboration with Physics Wallah Vidyapeeth ===
In a significant move to enhance the academic offerings, Don Bosco Higher Secondary School, Baghchung, has partnered with Physics Wallah Vidyapeeth to introduce the School Integrated Program (SIP). This collaboration aims to provide students with access to high-quality educational resources and expert instruction, particularly in preparation for competitive exams like JEE and NEET (UG).

== Facilities ==
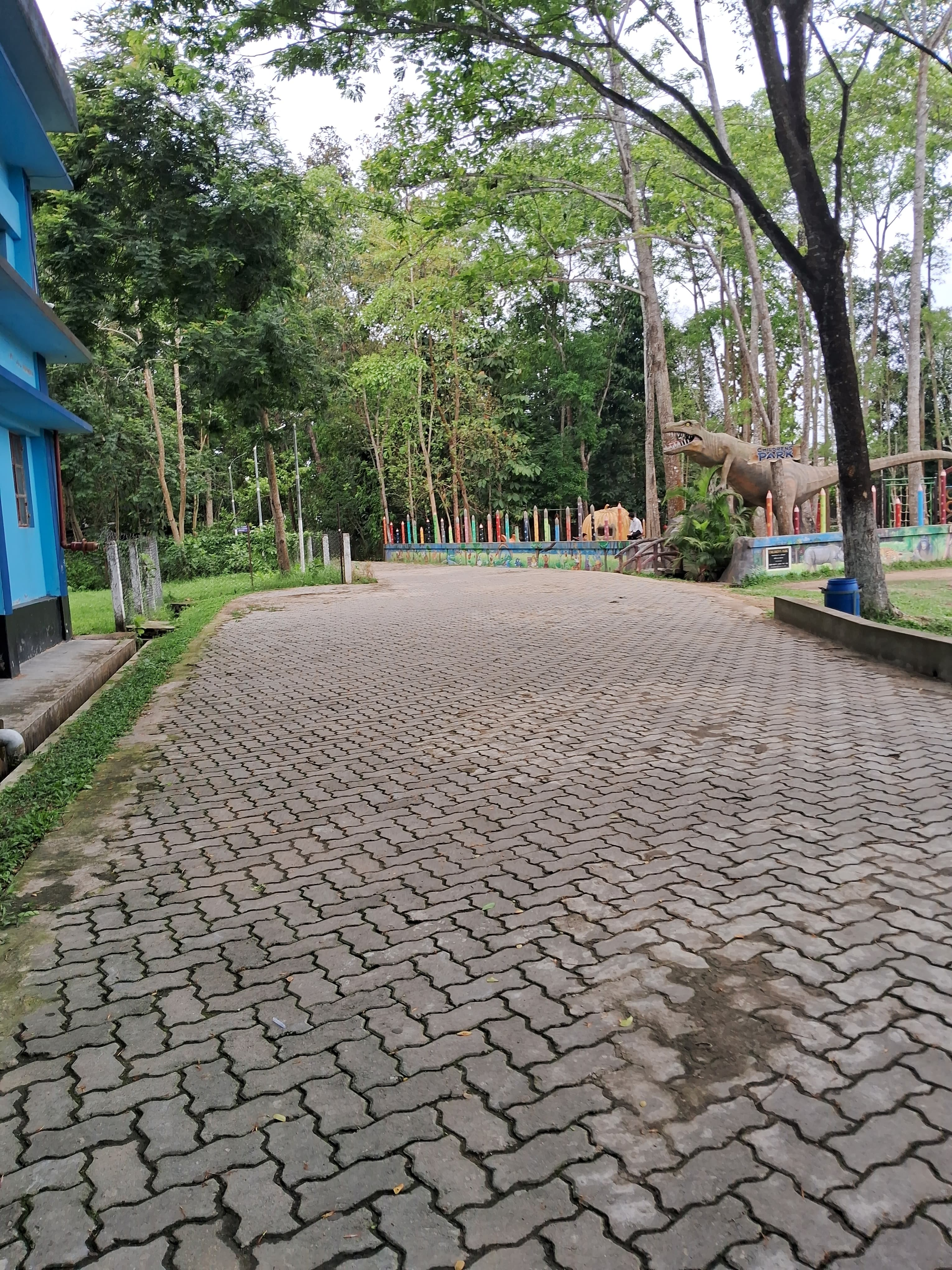
Pathway leading to the children's park on the campus

The school has air conditioned smart classrooms. It also has physics, biology and chemistry laboratories, a library and two computer labs with Windows computers.

The campus has a basketball court and two large playgrounds surrounded by greenery, providing space for sports and outdoor activities. Additionally, there is a children’s park, a small hostel with a capacity of approximately 50 students, two canteens, and access to clean drinking water.

== School hours ==
On weekdays, school starts at 8 am and ends at 3 pm. There is also school on Saturdays, from 8 am to 12 pm.

== Achievements ==
Don Bosco Higher Secondary School, Baghchung, is renowned for its consistent performance in the HSLC examinations, producing numerous rank holders over the years. Recent notable achievements include:

- In HSLC 2018, Angana Hazarika occupied the eight position with an aggregate of 586 marks
- Chinmoy Hazarika, the second rank holder in the HSLC examination, 2019 from DBHSS-Baghchung has brought laurels to Jorhat in Eastern Assam.
- Samadrita Sarmah and Olivia Bora from DBHSS-Baghchung secured 4th and 8th position in HSLC examination 2020
