= Bhogdoi River =

River in Assam, India

The Bhogdoi River is a tributary of the Brahmaputra in India. From its origin in the Naga hills it flows through the city of Jorhat and then it merges with another river and its name becomes Gelabill. The previous name of the river was Desoi. The Bhoghdoi river has become heavily polluted over the years.
