= Jorhat Gymkhana Club =

Sports venue in Jorhat, Assam, India

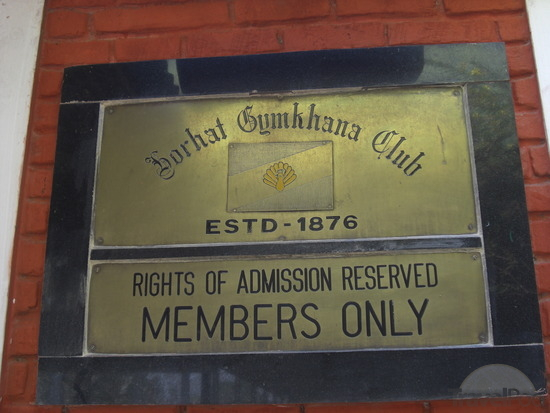
- Jorhat Gymkhana Club
- Interactive map of Jorhat Gymkhana Club
- 26°43′57″N 94°13′20″E

Club information
- Location: Club Road, Jorhat, Assam 785008
- Established: 1876; 150 years ago
- Total holes: 9

Jorhat Gymkhana Club is a sports venue located in Jorhat, Assam. Club built in 1876 by D. Slimmons. The club has been a venue for horse races, lawn tennis grass courts, swimming pool, billiards, polo, golf, cricket etc. ever since its inauguration. The Governor's Cup is played here every year with a 9-hole golf course circuit.

== History ==
View of the clubhouse from the grounds at Jorhat Gymkhana Club

The golf club is third oldest in India after Royal Calcutta Golf Club (1829) and Thiruvananthapuram Golf Club (1850). The club offers facilities in lawn tennis grass courts, swimming pool, billiards, polo, gentleman's bar and cinema theatre. The historic Jorhat Gymkhana Club is renowned for its century old annual horse racing event, Jorhat Races, have been held since 1877. The cricket ground here is known as Jorhat Gymkhana Ground and has a capacity of 8,000 as well as has a turf wicket. The ground hosted the matches of CK Nayudu Trophy which is Under-23 Indian domestic cricket tournament as well as the Senior Women's National Cricket Championship. It also serves as the home ground of Khelmati Sports Club, which uses this ground for cricket practice. The Club Road was the first asphalt road laid which connect the city centre with the Jorhat Gymkhana Club.
