= Jorehaut Provincial Railway =

Railway system in British India

- Company type: Private
- Founded: 1884 (142 years ago)
- Defunct: 1943 (83 years ago)
- Headquarters: Jorhat, British India
- Area served: Dibrugarh and Tinsukia, Assam
- Services: Rail transport

Jorehaut Provincial Railway (JPR) was a railway system in British India.

== History ==
In 1885, a narrow gauge train services Jorehaut Provincial Railway had come into operation and ultimately became instrumental in the rapid growth of the tea industry. The first railway junction in Assam was Makum Junction on the Dibru-Sadiya Railway (DSR) line, and the second junction was Cinnamara of the Jorehaut Provincial Railway (JPR). The former railway line had proven its practicability. The chief commissioner of Assam, Steuart Bayley, was so enthralled by the Darjeeling Himalayan Railway (DHR), that he authorized the construction of a railway line in Jorehat in 1882 at an estimated cost of 111,320 Indian Rupees. This cost was to be paid from the provincial revenues of Assam without obtaining the sanction of the Government of India.

In September 1883, Lord Ripon sanctioned the extension of the branch line with the provision that the name should be changed from Kokilamukh Tramway to Kokilamukh State Railway. By November 1884, the line was completed to the Dhali River and opened for goods traffic on 15 December 1884. Though it had handled freight traffic successfully, the line was not deemed fit for passenger traffic until 26 February 1886. Meanwhile, the stretch between Gohaingaon and Jorhat was renamed and Chief Commissioner of Assam Sir C. A. Elliott formally opened the now Kokilamukh State Railway on 9 December 1984.

The bridge over the Dhali River was built and the line was extended to Titabar, another stretch of just 1.75 miles (2.82 km), on 16 July 1887. This section also required further inspection and realignment before the first passenger train could run, on 26 February 1888. The construction of a 7-mile (11 km) branch line from Cinnamara to Mariani was carried out in December 1884, and opened for freight traffic on 7 January 1885. However, passenger traffic was prohibited until 26 February 1888.

On 11 November 1989, an alternative cold weather section 3.25 miles (5.23 km) long was opened, making a total distance of 28.5 mi (45.9 km). With the changes of ghats, a change in nomenclature would also follow. Thus Kokilamukh State Railway was renamed Jorehaut State Railway, and then, when it was linked to Assam Bengal Railway, renamed again to "Jorhat Provincial State Railway" (JPR).

Technically this line was not a very difficult one to construct, being unballasted, with the sharpest curve of 480-foot (150 m) radius and a ruling gradient of 1 in 800, except the Jorhat-Cinnamara stretch, where it was 1 in 400. At the initial stage, Kokilamukh Railway found it cheaper to buy second-hand engines running on a similar gauge, the DHR being a storehouse of the worn out ones. "Tiny" was the first locomotive brought by the contractors to Siliguri to assist in the construction of DHR. The engine was originally named "Sutaram", but by the time it reached Siliguri it had become "Tiny". The exact date of "Tiny's" arrival at Siliguri is unknown, but it assisted the contractors in constructing the DHR from early 1880. This is certain because this was the engine pressed into service to haul the Viceroy and his party up the tramway. "Tiny" was never assigned a DHR number and was relegated to shunting duties around Siliguri. In 1886 it was packed off to serve the tea gardens of the Jorhat State Railways where it ran as their engine No. 4. It replaced the previous three locomotives which were prone to derailments with their wheels falling off. The 2 ft (610 mm) gauge wallahs of India were a closely knit fraternity, not averse to swapping rolling stocks with each other. For instance, Jimmy Shaw, the works Manager of DHR at Tindharia, visited the then redundant JPR in 1942, scrounging for a locomotive or two. He suggested that four of the latter's locomotives be purchased for the Kishanganj section, but management turned it down. The DHR sold four of its engines to the ARTC to be worked in the colliery tram track at Tipongpani, near Margherita. Similarly two of JPR’s locomotives were at work on the DHR until the end of the 20th century.

== Classification ==
It was labeled as a Class III railway according to Indian Railway Classification System of 1926.

== Conversion to broad gauge ==
The railway network was converted to 1,676 mm (5 ft 6 in) broad gauge in 2010s.
