= Ganesh Gogoi =

Indian poet, lyricist, playwright and actor

- Born: 28 December 1907; Jorhat, Assam, India
- Died: 21 August 1938 (aged 30)
- Occupations: Author, poet and actor
- Writing career
- Genre: Assamese literature

Ganesh Gogoi (1907– 1938) was a poet of Assam and is remembered also as a lyricist, composer, playwright, actor and football player. He is also known as Papori Kobi.

== Life ==
Ganesh Gogoi was born at Jorhat of Assam on 28 December 1907. His father's name was Kanak Chandra Gogoi.

Ganesh Gogoi spent his childhood and student life in his native place Jorhat. He passed the Matric examination from Jorhat Government High School in the second division. After matriculation, he was admitted to Cotton College, Guwahati, Assam in the year 1926. He left for Kolkata in 1927 and was admitted to Ripon College (now called Surendranath College) for higher studies. Later on he also got admission to the Kashi Hindu university (Now Banaras Hindu University), but did not complete his study

Some of his famous dramas had pictured in 'Jorhat Theatre' where Ganesh Gogoi used to stage these dramas.

Drama

- Jerengar Sati (1937)
- Sakunir Pratisodh
- Kashmir Kurmari
- Lachit
- Kuri Satika, etc.

Poetry

- Papori (1934) A romantic Assamese poetry book.
- Swapna bhanga (1934)
- Rupajyoti (1945)
- Naoria
- Boragi

Many songs were published in magazines like Banhi, Awahan, Ghar-Jeuti, Dainik Batori, Na-Jon, etc. at that time. His only book on lyrics is titled Geetimala. Former Chief Minister of Assam Tarun Gogoi was his nephew.

== Honours ==
- The Government of Assam to institute an award in the name of Ganesh Gogoi from the year 2009. This film was officially selected for South Asian Film Festival 2007 at Dhaka.
- A documentary entitled Ganesh Gogoir Jiban Surabhi has been produced on his life and works.
- A park named as Ganesh Gogoi Kabita Kanan after him in Jorhat, Assam.

== See also ==
- List of Indian writers
- List of Indian poets
- Assamese literature
- Music of Assam
- List of Assamese writers with their pen names
