= Jorhat Theatre =

Theatre in Assam, India

- Formation: February 28, 1896; 130 years ago
- Type: Theatre Organization
- Location: Jorhat, Assam
- Key people: Budhindranath Delihial Bhattacharya, Chandradhar Barua, Radha Kanta Handique, Bedanta Baspati, Radhanath Phukon
- Parent organization: Jorhat Sarbajanik Sabha
- Formerly called: Jorhat Amateur Theatre

Jorhat Theatre is a theatre organization in Jorhat, Assam, India with a history of over a hundred years.

== History ==
From 1875, Jagannath Barooah's social cultural organization "Jorhat Sarbajanik Sabha" performed various dramas in the festival of Durga Puja in the name of "Jorhat Amateur Theatre". Later in 1896, some key peoples of Jorhat like Chandradhar Baruah, Radha Kanta Handique, Bedanta Baspati, Radhanath Phukon initiated the establishment of "Jorhat Theatre". The first drama performed at Jorhat Theatre was "Ramani Gabhoru" by Bhudhindranath Delihial Bhattacharya, the first secretary of Jorhat Theatre.

== Notable acts ==
- Sakunir Pratisodh by Ganesh Gogoi
- Naranarayan by Mitradev Mahanta
- Alibaba by Bipin Chandra Baruah
- Bhagya Porikkha by Chandradhar Baruah
- Bhogjora by Phani Sharma
- Pandit Ravi Shankar and Alla Rakhas first performance in Assam, 1964
- Performance of Shakespeara by Geoffrey Kendal in 1940 and 1965
