= Assam Women's University =

Public university in Jorhat, India

- Type: Public
- Established: 2013 (13 years ago)
- Chancellor: Governor of Assam
- Vice-Chancellor: Dr. Madhumita Barooah
- Location: Jorhat, Assam, India; 26°43′06″N 94°11′03″E
- Website: www.awu.ac.in/index.html

Assam Women's University is a public university located in Jorhat, Assam, India. It was established by the Assam Women's University Act, 2013 (XXII of 2013) by the Assam Government.

During the initial set up Assam Agricultural University Vice-Chancellor was appointed as the mentor of the university by the state government.

On 12 September 2019, the Governor of Assam and chancellor of the university Jagdish Mukhi appointed Malinee Goswami as the first vice chancellor of the university.
