= Garampani =

- Town
- Location in Assam, India Garampani (India)
- Coordinates: 26°24′0″N 93°52′0″E
- Country: India
- State: Assam
- District: Karbi Anglong
- Elevation: 117 m (384 ft)

Languages
  - Official: Assamese
- Time zone: UTC+5:30 (IST)
- PIN: 788931
- Vehicle registration: AS
- Coastline: 0 kilometres (0 mi)

Garampani is a town in Golaghat district, Assam, India.

== Geography ==
It is located at an elevation of 117 m above MSL.

== Location ==
National Highway 39 passes through Garampani. It is 25 km south of Golaghat.

== Places of interest ==
- Garampani Wildlife Sanctuary
- Kaziranga National Park
