= Chekonidhara =

- city
- Location in Assam, India Chekonidhara (India)
- Coordinates: 26.708°N 94.2556°E
- Country: India
- State: Assam
- District: Jorhat

Population (2001)
  - Total: 7,315

Languages
  - Official: Assamese
- Time zone: UTC+5:30 (IST)
- Vehicle registration: AS

Chekonidhara is a census town in Jorhat district in the state of Assam, India.

== Demographics ==
As of 2001 India census, Chekonidhara had a population of 7315. Males constitute 50% of the population and females 50%. Chekonidhara has an average literacy rate of 85%, higher than the national average of 59.5%; with male literacy of 85% and female literacy of 84%. 8% of the population is under 6 years of age.
