= Golaghat Municipal Board =

Civic body in Assam, Northeast India (founded 1920)

Type
- Type: Municipal Board

History
- Founded: 1920; 106 years ago

Leadership
- Deputy Commissioner: J. D. Rajkhowa
- Chairman: Ghanshyam Barhoi

Footnotes
- ^{†} Golaghat has been the headquarter of oldest sub-division for over 150 years since 1839. ^{†}Golaghat Municipal Board is one of the oldest civic bodies of the state of Assam.

The Golaghat Municipal Board or the GMB, established in 1920, one of the oldest civic bodies of the state of Assam, formed before Indian Independence of 1947, is responsible for the civic infrastructure and administration of the city of Golaghat. The Golaghat Municipal Board with a population of about 60 thousand is Golaghat sub-district's only municipal board located in Golaghat sub-district of Golaghat district in the state Assam in India. Total geographical area of Golaghat municipal board is 7.32 square kilometres (2.83 sq mi). There are 13 wards in the city, and the board has the total administration over 9,646 houses to which it supplies basic amenities like water and sewerage. It is also authorized to build roads within Municipal Board limits and impose taxes on properties in its jurisdiction.

== History ==
Golaghat is one of the oldest tea urban centres of Assam. The area is known for rich cultural heritage, its contribution during India's freedom struggle, tea gardens, forest reserves, including the world heritage site - Kaziranga National Park, Robin's Children and ABITA Natural History Museum, hot water springs, besides the recent addition being Numaligarh Refinery Limited.

Golaghat has been the headquarter of oldest sub-division for over 150 years since 1839 and declared as a District in 1987. Golaghat Municipality Board is a historical one in terms of its age (since 1920).

== General elections ==
The general elections for the elected wing of the corporation is held every 5 years. For the civic body election in 2015, as many as 51 candidates from all the major parties, including the BJP, AGP and Congress, filed their nomination papers.

== Services ==
The GMB is responsible for certain obligatory services, some of which include:

- Road maintenance under the municipal area jurisdiction
- Lane dividers and underground cabling for street light installations
- Sewerage and sanitation
- Water treatment and distribution
- Maintenance of recreational parks
- Maintenance of Golaghat Civil Hospital
- Updates to street signs / bye-lanes
- Improvement of traffic points

== See also ==
- Golaghat
- Golaghat district
