= Jorhat Municipal Board =

Type
- Type: Municipal Board

History
- Founded: 1909; 117 years ago

Leadership
- Deputy Commissioner: Shri Jay Shivani, IAS
- Chairman: Lakhimi Khargharia
- Seats: 19

The Jorhat Municipal Board (JMB) of Jorhat, India was formed in 1909. The first chairman of the Jorhat Municipal Board was Lt. Col. Thomas Playfair, who held the position from 3 February 1911 to 2 March 1917. The current Municipal office is located on the 2nd floor of the Unnayan Bhavan Complex in Jorhat, Assam.

== Background ==
The Jorhat Municipal Board, an urban administrative body, began its operations in 1909. Its goals are aimed at providing for the welfare of residents of Jorhat, the second largest city of Assam, a northeastern state within Guwahati of India (located specifically at 26 degrees North, 94 degrees East). Jorhat was previously the capital of the Ahom Kingdom in 1794. As a result of the Sarai Act of 1867, which banned sarais, temporary shelters for travelers whose identities and backgrounds were unknown to the state, from housing anymore of those travelers without keeping records, a union board emerged to enforce local governing and maintenance. In 1909, this board became the Jorhat Municipal Board, led by President Lt. Col. A. Playfair. It provided for an area ranging about 5 square kilometers, 15 wards, and a population of nearly 5,000. Now, the Board's range has extended to a 9.73 square kilometers, 19 wards, and a steadily growing population reaching 71,782 as per Census 2011. In 2012, the Board celebrated its 100th anniversary of serving Jorhat residents. In the year of 2015 Jorhat municipality election, Bharatiya Janata party got the majority and form the board under the chairperson sjt Aruna Dutta for the first time. Out of the 19 wards BJP won 12 and formed the first BJP lead in the Jorhat municipality Board.

== Operations ==
The Jorhat Municipal Board works to provide new ways to better the quality of local life for the cities people while preserving the natural environment. The Board researches and searches for new available resources. Main infrastructural operations performed by the Board include renewable energy integration, road improvement, water quality improvement, safe solid waste management, combating disease, work on draining systems, street lighting improvements and more.

== See also ==
- Jorhat
- Board of Control (municipal government)
- India
