= Malow Ali =

Road in Jorhat, Assam

Malow ali is an area and a road in Jorhat, Assam, India. It is situated in the heart of the city, in the northern part of the Jorhat town.

It was built during Ahom King, Swargadeo Kamaleswar Singha in 1795–1810. The name Malow is originated from Monglu (Manipur word). The road is now an important road in Jorhat Town and it connects many villages of western part of Jorhat District specially the place called Malow.

One of the Ahom kings married a Meitei princess. Some Meitei people came to Jorhat with the said princess. They were settled there in the place which is now called Malow. Malow Ali is now under the PWD, Jorhat Division.
