= Jagannath Barooah University =

University in Assam

- Former names: Jorhat College, J.B. College
- Motto: The light that never fails
- Type: Public state university
- Established: August 19, 1930; 96 years ago (as J. B. College); 2023; 3 years ago (as J. B. University)
- Founders: Krishna Kanta Handique; Tulsi Narayan Sharma; Jagneswar Sarma; Phanidhar Dutta; Prafulla Pran Changkakati Gunagobinda Dutta
- Accreditation: NAAC
- Chancellor: Governor of Assam
- Vice-Chancellor: Jyoti Prasad Saikia
- Location: Jorhat, Assam, India; 26.7573°N 94.2046°E
- Campus: Urban
- Nickname: Jagannath Barooah University
- Website: jbu.ac.in

Jagannath Barooah University is a university located in Jorhat, Assam, India. It was founded on October 10, 1930. The college is recognised by University Grants Commission (UGC). It was accredited by National Assessment and Accreditation Council (NAAC), India in 2003. The college is promoted to the status of a university by Government of Assam by the Jagannath Barooah University Act 2023.

== History ==
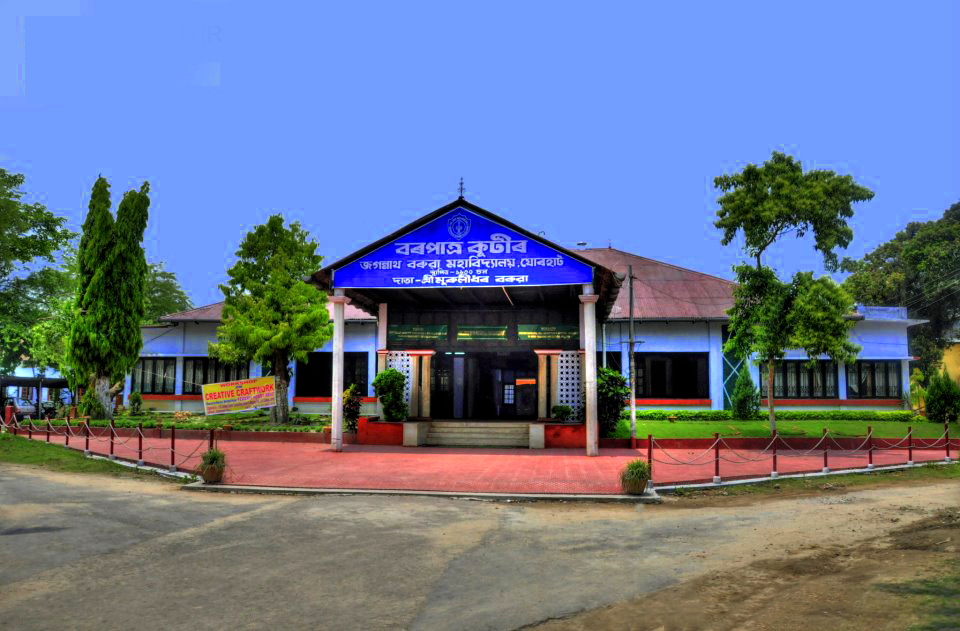
Front view of JB college

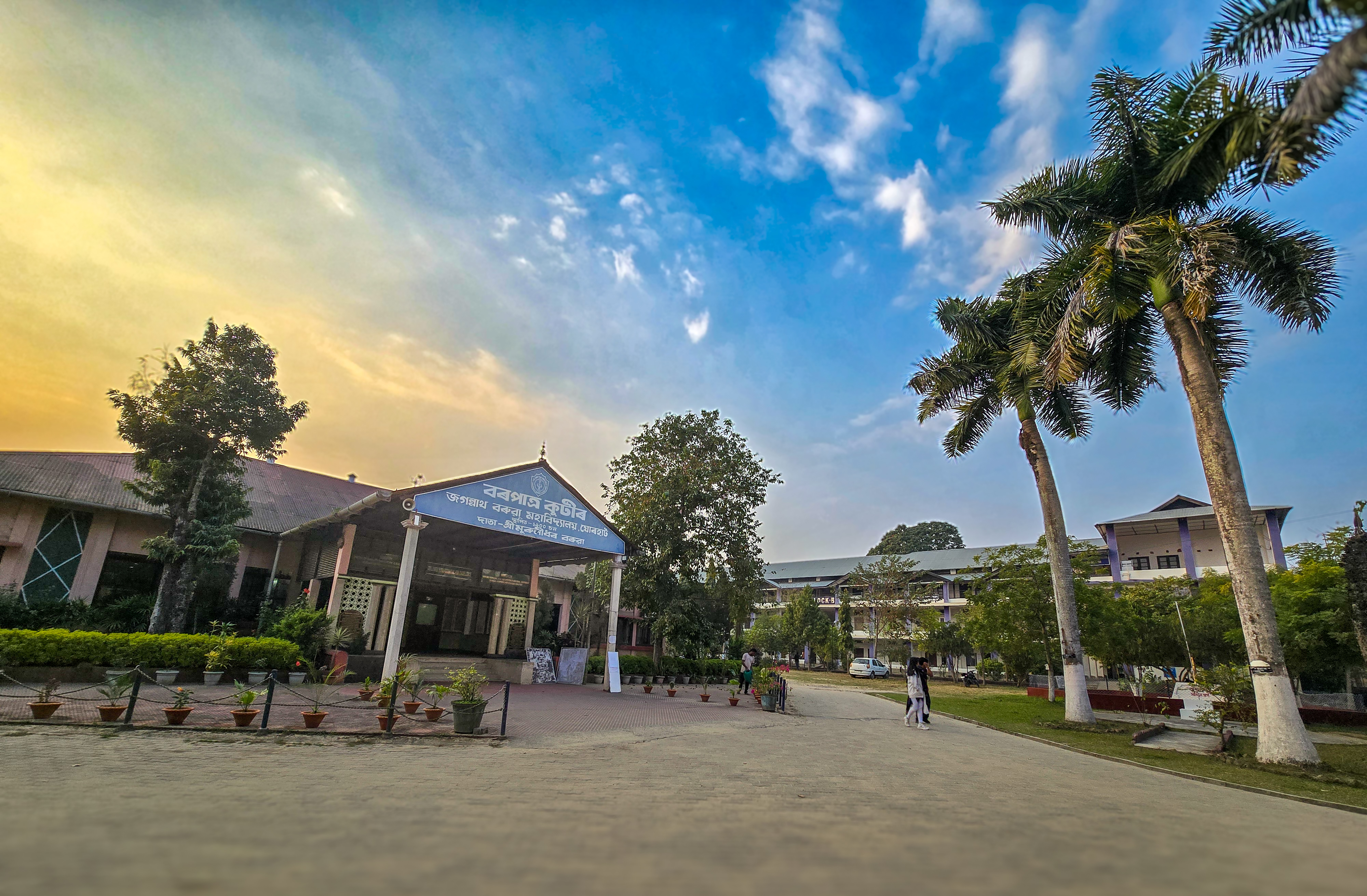
Different view of JB College

It was named Upper Assam College at first and later Jorhat College on 4 September 1930. On 25 June 1938, during a meeting under the then president, Chandradhar Barooah, it was renamed to the present Jagannath Barooah College in recognition of the commodious building 'Borpatra Kutir' along with the previous landowner, Murulidhar Barooah. Murulidhar Barooah had inherited this property from his grandfather Jagannath Barooah, who was the first graduate of Upper Assam in 1872 from Presidency College, Calcutta. The founder principal of this institution was Prof. Krishna Kanta Handique. The other dedicated founder teachers were Prof. Tulsi Narayan Sharma (Founder Secretary), Jagneswar Sarma, Phanidhar Dutta, Prafulla Pran Changkakati and Gunagobinda Dutta.

== Departments ==
- Assamese
- Bengali
- Bio-Technology
- Botany
- Chemistry
- Commerce
- Computer Science
- Economics
- Electronics
- English
- Geography
- Geology
- Hindi
- History
- Mathematics
- Philosophy
- Physics
- Political Science
- Sanskrit
- Sociology
- Statistics
- Zoology

== Accreditation ==
The college has been awarded grade "A" by the National Assessment and Accreditation Council

== Courses ==
The university offers undergraduate and post-graduate courses.

Bachelor Programme

- Bachelor of Computer Application (BCA)
- Bachelor of Arts (B.A)
- Bachelor of Commerce (B.COM)
- Bachelor of Science (B.Sc.)

Master programme

- Post-graduate courses in Geography, Philosophy, Assamese, Commerce,Political Science,History,Mathematics,Sociology,English
- Post-graduate courses under Distance Education Scheme of Dibrugarh University in following subjects: Assamese, Commerce, Economics, History, Mathematics and Political Science & Sociology.
- Post-graduate Diploma course in Computer Application., (PGDCA).

== Library ==
The college has a library, named as Krishnakanta Handiqui Central Library, housing around 53,000+ books, 3104 back volume and about 151 CD/DVDs. It subscribes to 15 national and local dailies, and offers national and international journals and magazines in Assamese, Hindi and English languages. Moreover, it has a collection of encyclopaedias relating to different subjects.

- Library Automation Software - Koha ILMS
- Web OPAC
- Library Hours - Monday to Saturday 09:00 AM – 04:30 PM

== College magazine ==
The college publishes an annual magazine, the "JBIAN" and the first issue of the magazine was published in 1939. The annual magazine is also published online in digital format.

== Notable alumni ==
- Sheela Borthakur, social worker and Padma Shri awardee
- Zubeen Garg, singer, composer, filmmaker, director and actor
- Tarun Gogoi, former Chief Minister of Assam
- Bijoy Krishna Handique, former union minister (MP)
- Pabitra Margherita, politician, actor, singer
- Jayanta Nath, singer, composer, film director.
- Manas Robin, singer, composer.
