= Jorhat =

Jorhat The Cultural Capital of Assam
- City
- Jorhat
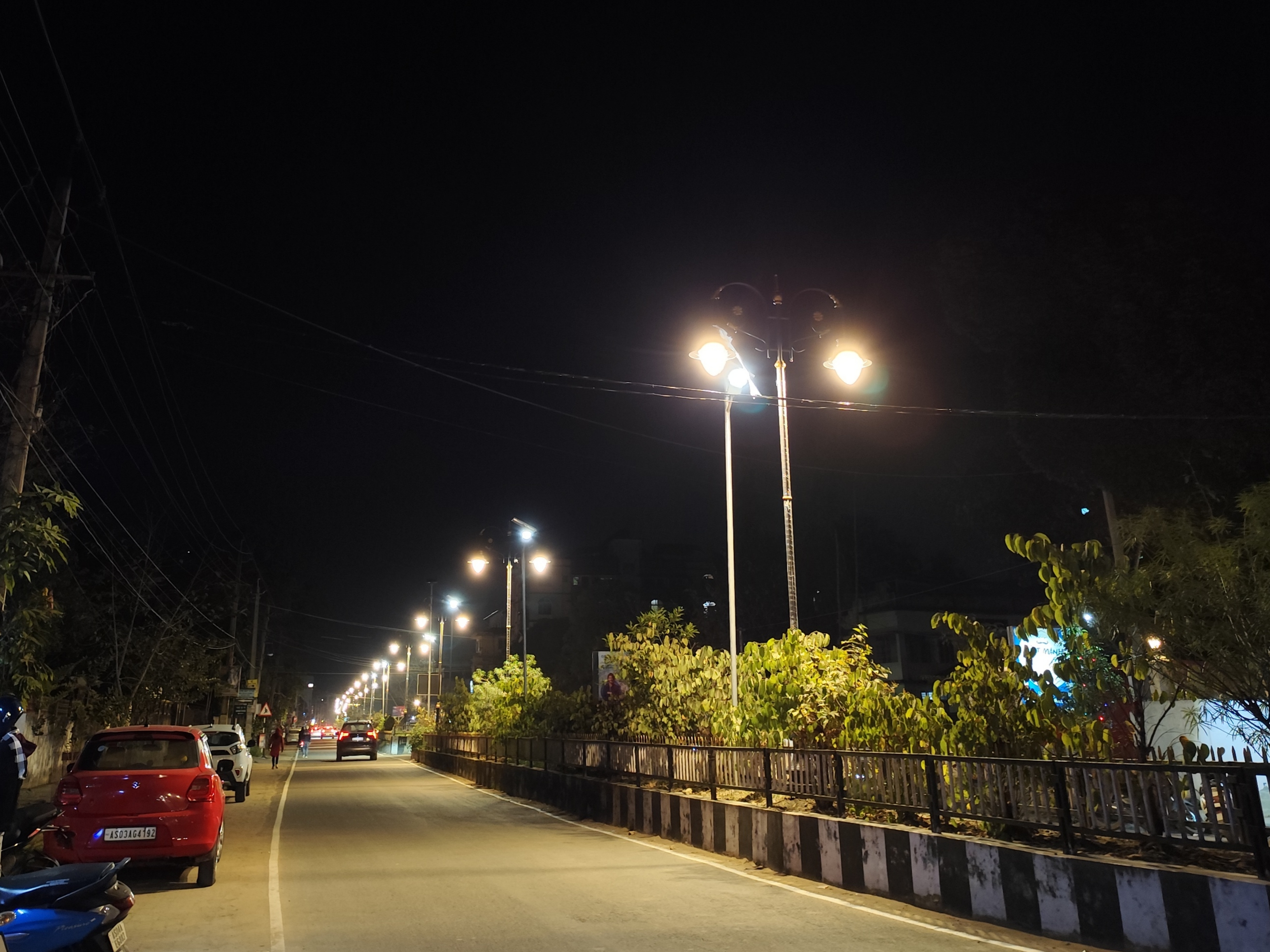
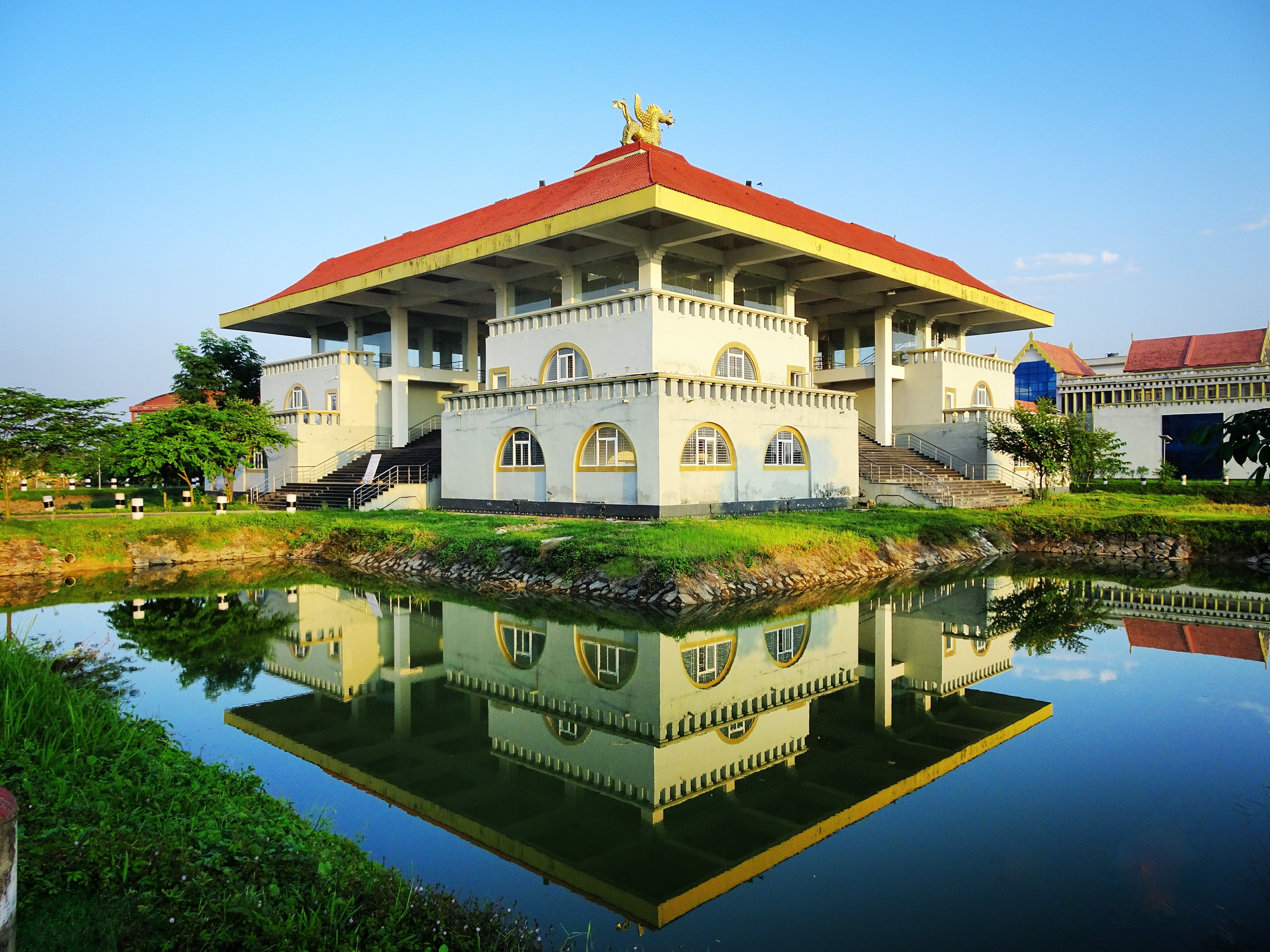
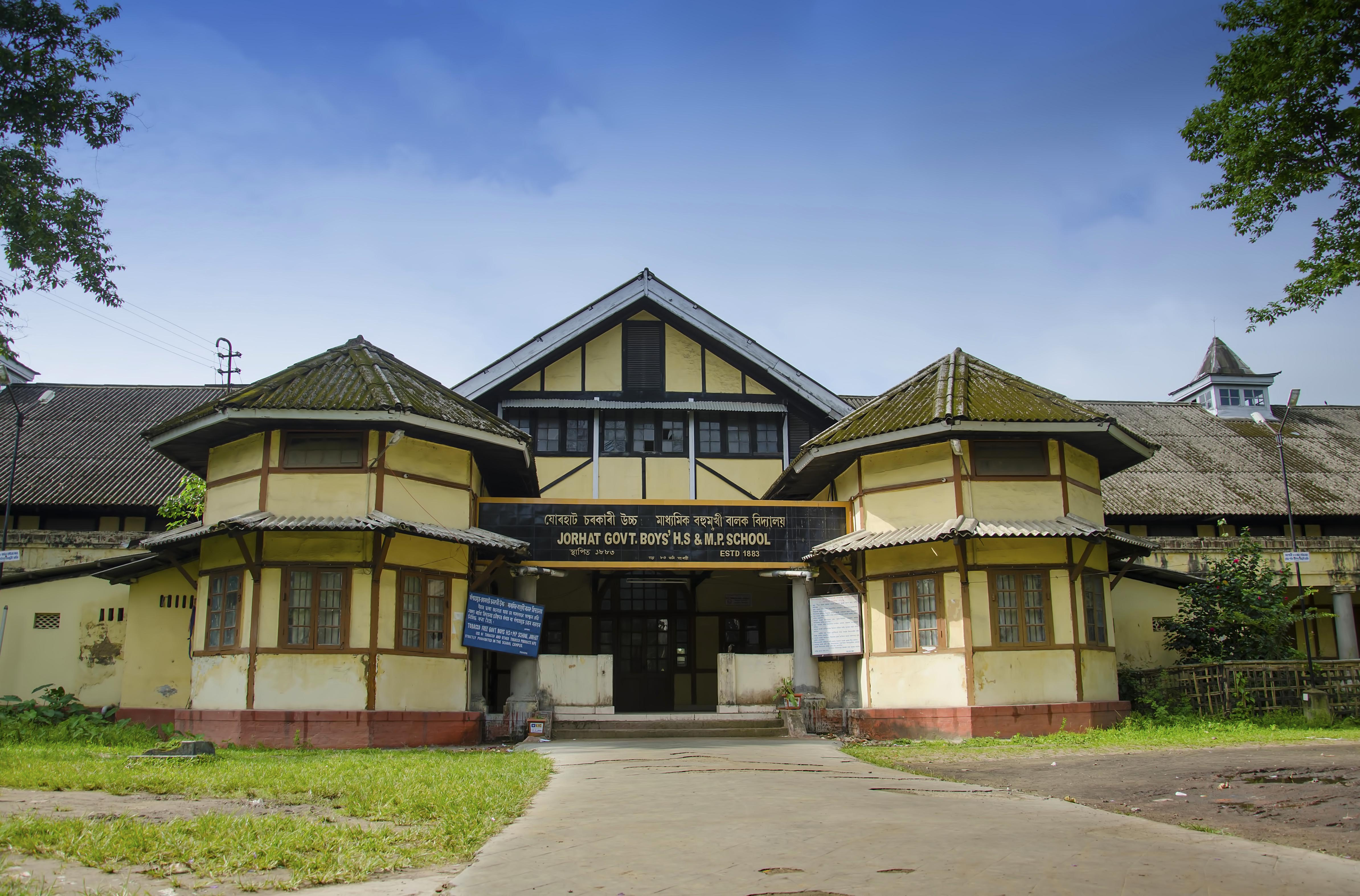
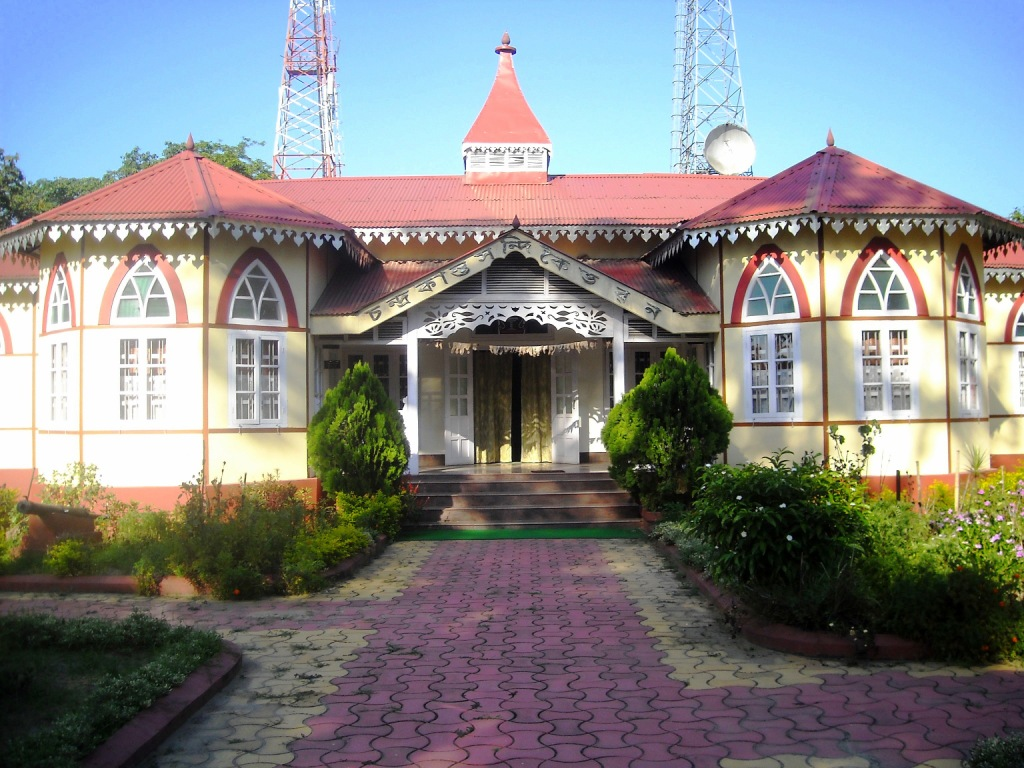
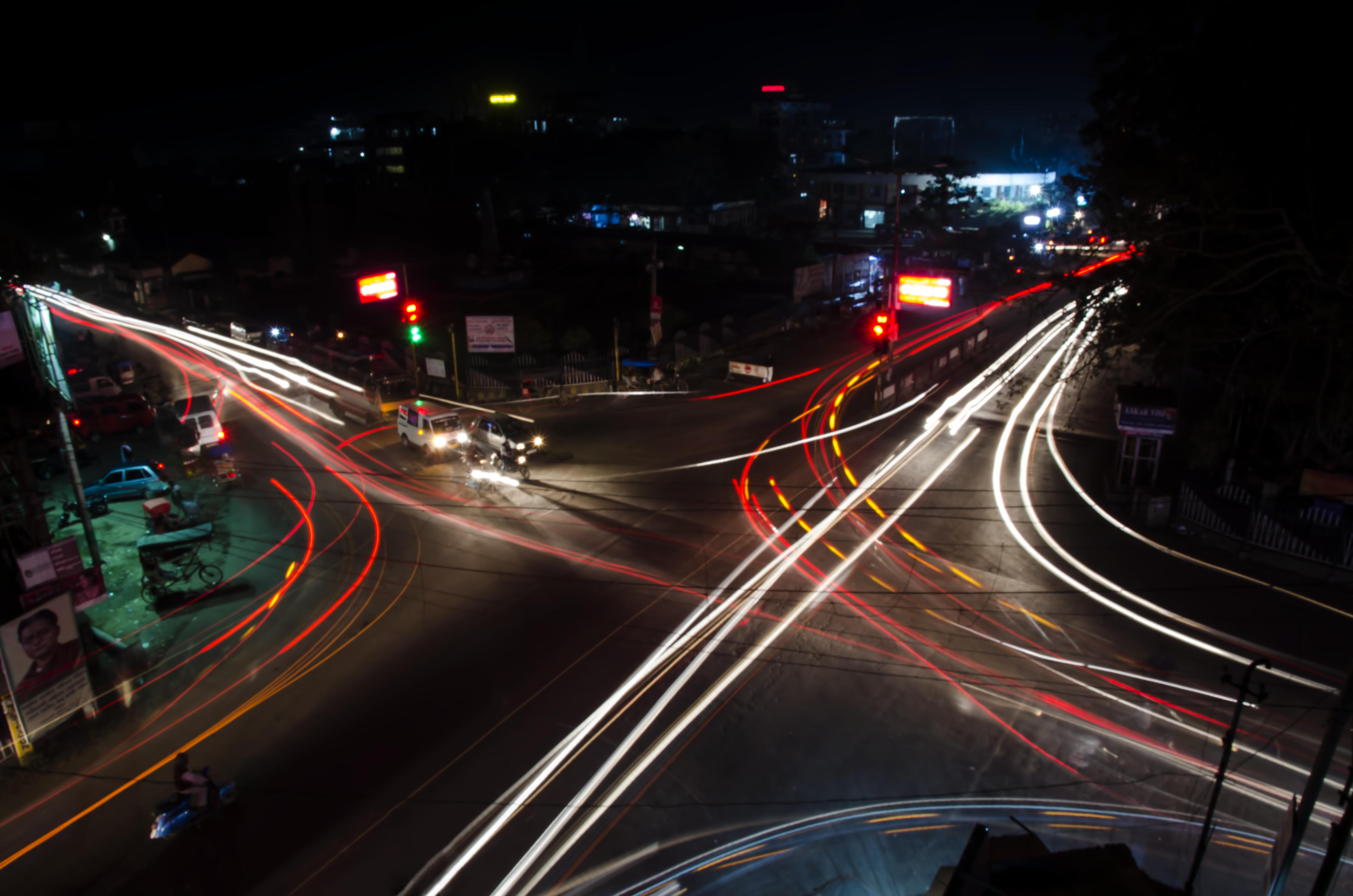
- From top, then left to right: TRP Road, Su-Ka-Pha Samannay Khetra, Jorhat Govt. Boys' Higher Secondary and Multi-Purpose School, Asam Sahitya Sabha headquarters, Night view of Baruah Chariali

- Location in Assam Jorhat (India)
- Coordinates: 26.75°N 94.22°E
- Country: India
- State: Assam
- Region: Upper Assam
- District: Jorhat
- Zone: 3 (Central, East & West)
- No. Of Wards: 19
- Established: 1909

Government
  - Type: Municipality
  - Body: Jorhat Municipal Board
  - District Commissioner: Sri Jay Shivani, IAS
  - Superintendent Of Police: Sri Subhrajyoti Bora, IPS

Area
  - Total: 72.8 km^{2} (28.1 sq mi)
- Elevation: 116 m (381 ft)

Population
  - Total: 126,736
  - Density: 1,740/km^{2} (4,510/sq mi)
- Demonym: Jorhatian
- Time zone: UTC+5:30 (IST)
- PIN: 7850XX
- Telephone code: 0376
- Vehicle registration: AS-03
- Sex Ratio: 951 ♀️/ 1000 ♂️
- Climate: Cwa
- Official Language: Assamese
- Literacy Rate: ▲90.01% high
- Lok Sabha Constituency: Jorhat
- Vidhan Sabha Constituency: Jorhat, Titabar, Mariani, Teok
- Website: jorhat.assam.gov.in

Jorhat (/ˈdʒɔːrhɑːt/ JOR-haht/Assamese: [zʊ(ɹ).ɦat]) is the fourth largest city in the Indian state of Assam, located 300 km east of state capital Dispur. It is the administrative headquarters of the Jorhat District. Jorhat is also home to Asia's oldest golf course, the Jorhat Gymkhana Club. Located on the banks of the Bhogdoi River, Jorhat continues to be amongst the fastest growing urban centers in the state of Assam.

== Etymology ==
Jorhat ("jor" means twin and "hat" means market) means two hats or mandis - "Masorhaat" and "Sowkihat" which existed on the opposite banks of the Bhugdoi river.

== History ==
The name Jorhat is derived from the Assamese words "Jor" (two) and "Hat" (market), referring to the historic markets of Macharhat and Chowkihat, which were located on opposite banks of the Bhogdoi River. In 1794, Ahom king Gaurinath Singha established Jorhat as the fifth and last capital of the Ahom Kingdom after the Moamaria rebels occupied Rangpur. Jorhat remained the capital of the Ahom kingdom until the British occupation of Assam in 1826. The city is known for its Ahom-period heritage, including the historical Rajamaidam, Lachit Borphukan's Maidam, Captain Gohain's Maidam, Rajmao Pukhuri, Mithapukhuri, Burhi Goshani Dewalaya, Hatigarh Dewalaya, Bibudhi Garh, and Borbheti, which reflect its importance during the late Ahom period.

=== Under Konbaung empire ===
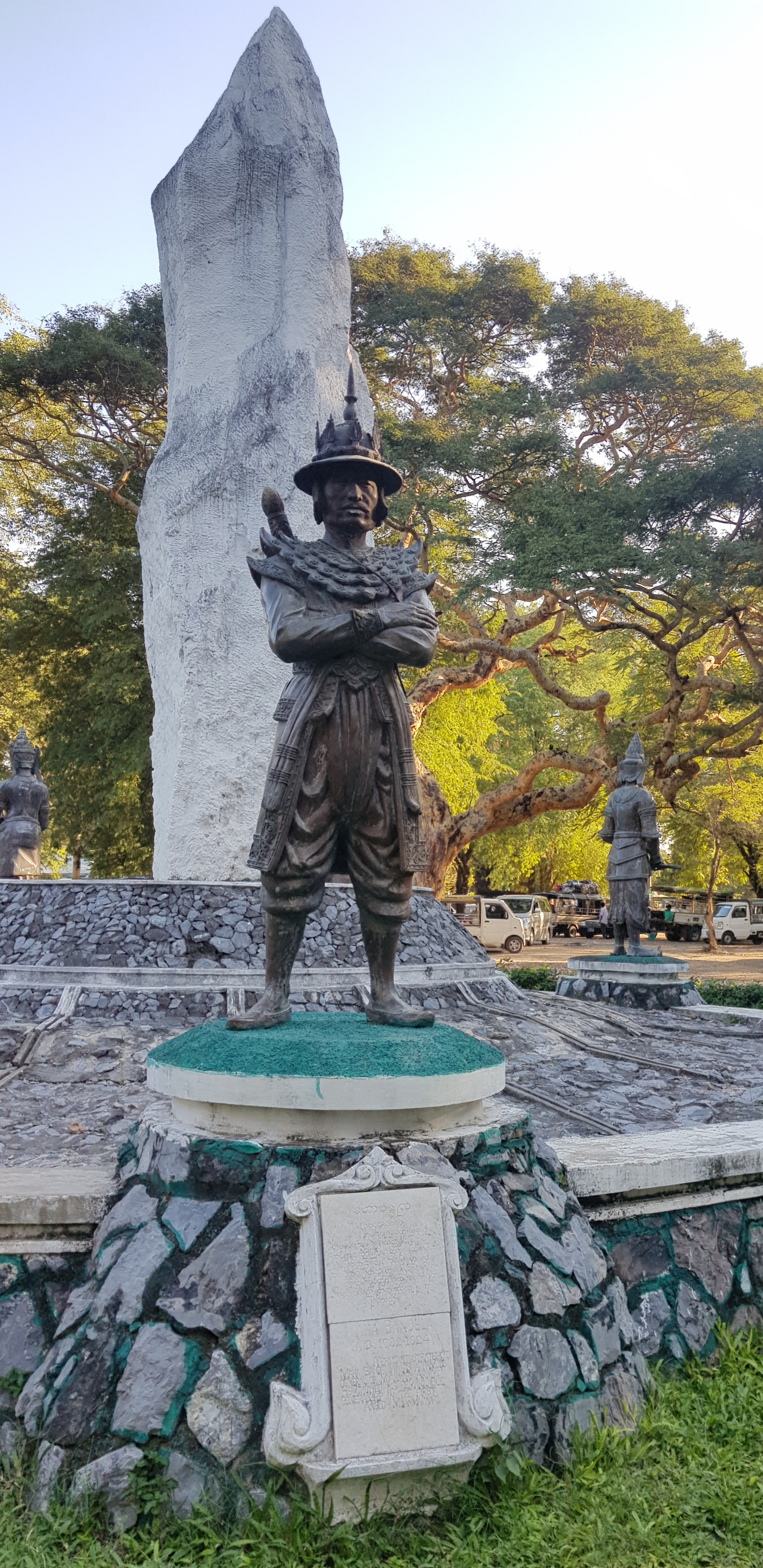
Maha Bandula who led the Burmese forces to Jorhat

The town was occupied by the Burmese Konbaung dynasty between 1817 - 1825. The Burmese left the commander Mingimaha Tilwa in charge of the area who appointed Jogeswar Singha as the new puppet King in 1821 in Jorhat. Later when the deposed king Chandrakanta Singha tried to fight back, Bagyidaw (1819 – 1837), the seventh King of Burma sent the greatest of his generals Mingimaha Bandula with 20,000 troops (including 10,000 Kamti Shan and Kachin levies who were chieftains of Mongkawng and Hukawng) who defeated Chandrakanta Singha at Mahgarh near Jorhat and reestablished Burmese authority in Assam. The defeat of Chandrakanta on 12 June 1822 marks the start of the Burmese rule in Assam. and Burmese commander Mingimaha Tilwa was made the king. Maha Bandula then returned to Ava in Myanmar.

=== Under British Empire ===
In 1885, a narrow-gauge railway, Jorehaut Provincial Railway, became operational. In time, this contributed to the rapid growth of the tea industry around the whole region.

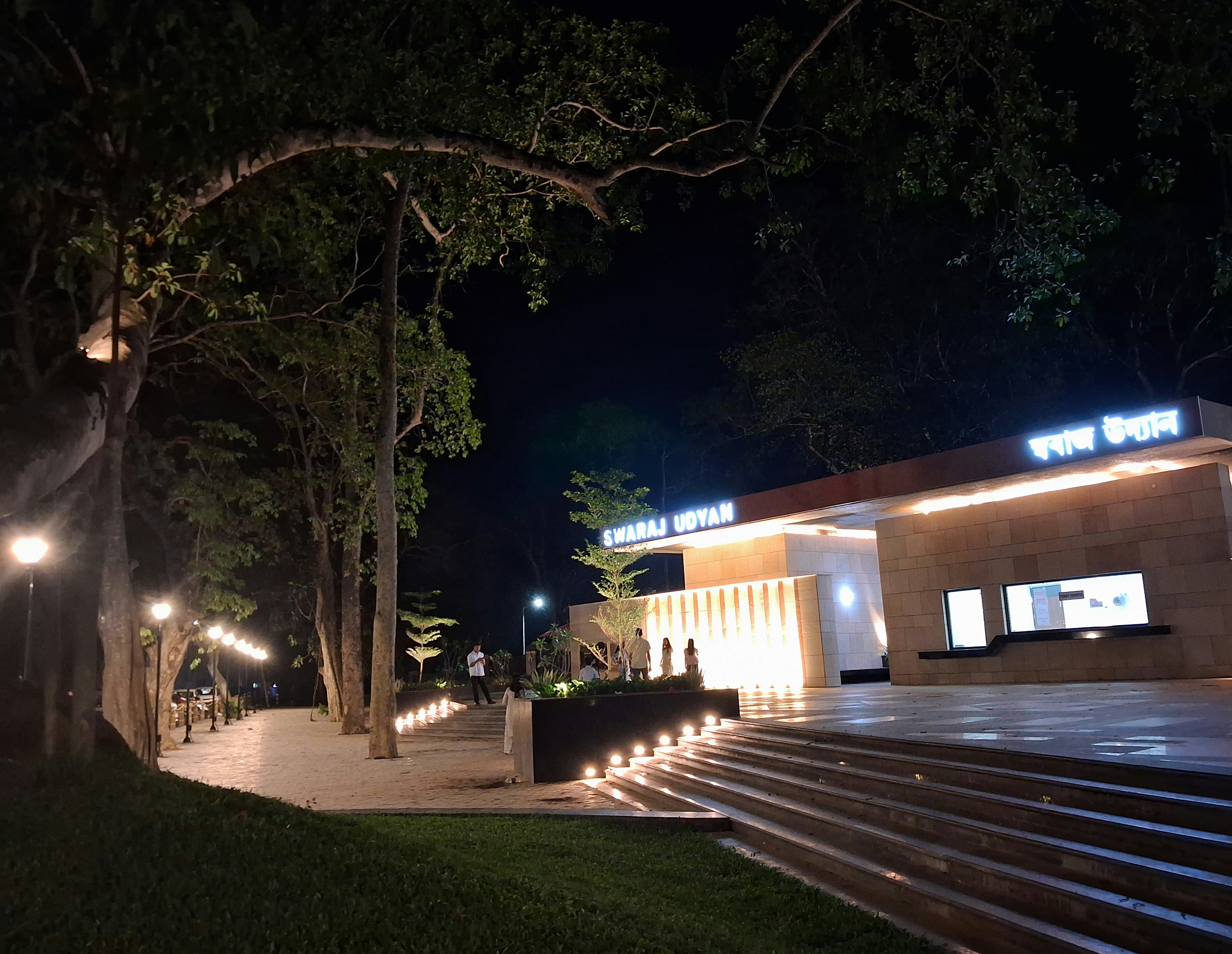
Swaraj Udyan, Jorhat

== Geography ==
Jorhat is located at 26.75°N 94.22°E. It has an average elevation of 116 metres (381 feet).

The municipality covers an area of 72.8 square kilometres (28.1 sq mi), has 19 wards with a population of 71,398 as per 2011 census.The district spreads over 2,859 square kilometres (1,104 sq mi) and had a population of 870,000 according to a 1991 census. Population density at that time was 306 persons per square kilometre (793/sq mi). The sex ratio is 913 (913 females per 1000 males).

Jorhat is situated in Upper Assam between the Brahmaputra River to the north and the state of Nagaland to the south. The city is located at an average elevation of about 116 metres (381 feet) above sea level and lies at approximately 26.75° N latitude and 94.22° E longitude. Jorhat experiences a humid subtropical climate.

== Climate ==
Climate data for Jorhat (1991–2020)
Month	Jan	Feb	Mar	Apr	May	Jun	Jul	Aug	Sep	Oct	Nov	Dec	Year
Record high °C (°F)	29.6 (85.3)	32.7 (90.9)	35.3 (95.5)	40.0 (104.0)	37.8 (100.0)	37.3 (99.1)	38.5 (101.3)	37.5 (99.5)	39.6 (103.3)	36.0 (96.8)	34.4 (93.9)	29.7 (85.5)	40.0 (104.0)
Mean daily maximum °C (°F)	23.6 (74.5)	25.8 (78.4)	27.8 (82.0)	28.8 (83.8)	30.1 (86.2)	32.2 (90.0)	32.6 (90.7)	33.0 (91.4)	32.2 (90.0)	30.6 (87.1)	27.8 (82.0)	24.6 (76.3)	29.1 (84.4)
Mean daily minimum °C (°F)	9.9 (49.8)	12.4 (54.3)	16.0 (60.8)	19.4 (66.9)	22.3 (72.1)	25.1 (77.2)	25.6 (78.1)	25.7 (78.3)	25.0 (77.0)	22.1 (71.8)	15.7 (60.3)	11.4 (52.5)	19.1 (66.4)
Record low °C (°F)	4.4 (39.9)	5.6 (42.1)	8.9 (48.0)	13.0 (55.4)	15.4 (59.7)	19.1 (66.4)	21.0 (69.8)	20.2 (68.4)	18.2 (64.8)	15.6 (60.1)	9.4 (48.9)	5.0 (41.0)	4.4 (39.9)
Average rainfall mm (inches)	8.1 (0.32)	23.3 (0.92)	62.4 (2.46)	177.2 (6.98)	280.9 (11.06)	309.6 (12.19)	396.0 (15.59)	287.3 (11.31)	246.1 (9.69)	102.4 (4.03)	11.1 (0.44)	17.4 (0.69)	1,921.7 (75.66)
Average rainy days	1.1	2.5	5.5	11.0	14.3	15.4	17.3	15.0	13.5	5.6	1.5	1.4	104.2
Average relative humidity (%) (at 17:30 IST)	82	71	68	74	78	79	78	79	84	85	85	85	79
Source: India Meteorological Department

== Local Governance ==
The Jorhat Municipal Board was established in 1909, making it one of the oldest urban local bodies in Assam. It evolved from a union board formed following the enactment of the Sarai Act of 1867, which introduced local oversight for the regulation and maintenance of travellers' shelters. The board was constituted under the leadership of Lt. Col. A. K. Playfair, who later served as its first chairman. At the time of its establishment, it administered an area of about 5 square kilometres comprising 15 wards with a population of nearly 5,000. Over time, its jurisdiction expanded to 19 wards covering 15.65 square kilometres. In 2012, the Jorhat Municipal Board celebrated its centenary of municipal administration.

The Jorhat Municipal Board is administered under the provisions of the Assam Municipal Act, 1956 (Assam Act XV of 1957), which provides the legal framework for the constitution, administration and governance of municipal boards in the state of Assam.

The administrative functions of the Jorhat Municipal Board are headed by the Executive Officer, Paramananda Nath, who serves as the chief executive officer of the board. The Board is headed by Chairman Mrs. Lakhimi Khargharia, with Mr. Dilip kr Dutta serving as the Vice Chairman. Together, they provide the elected leadership of the municipal board.

The Jorhat Municipal Board functions through several administrative departments, including the General Administration Department, Accounts & Finance Department, Engineering Department, Solid Waste Department, and Tax & Revenue Department, which are responsible for the board's administrative, financial, engineering, sanitation, and revenue-related functions.

== Demographics ==
Religion in Jorhat City
Religion	Percent
Hinduism	87.49%
Islam	10.50%
Christianity	0.62%
Sikhism	0.46%
Buddhism	0.32%
Jainism	0.32%
Other or not stated	0.30%

Jorhat Municipal Board (covering the out growth area) had a population of 200,000+ by the mid-2020s.

The average literacy rate of Jorhat in 2011 was 91.39%. Gender-wise, male and female literacy were 93.63% and 88.99% respectively, which is one of the highest in the state.

Jorhat's sex ratio stood at 935 females per 1000 males, according to the Census 2011 Directorate.

Hindus were 87.49% of the population, while Muslims were 10.50% and Christians 0.62% of the population respectively.

Scheduled Castes and Scheduled Tribes are 6.40% and 1.84% of the population respectively.

=== Languages ===
Languages spoken in Jorhat (2011)
1. Assamese (70.1%)
2. Bengali (12.3%)
3. Hindi (11.6%)
4. Bhojpuri (1.01%)
5. Sadri (0.38%)
6. Santali (0.33%)
7. Others (4.32%)

Assamese is the predominant language and is spoken by 70.08% of the population, while Bengali was spoken by 12.27%. Hindi (11.60%) and Bhojpuri (1.01%) are spoken by migrants from the Gangetic plains, such as traders and labourers. Ethnic languages like Mising and Deori are also spoken by the respective ethnicity. Other small languages in the city include Marwari, Sadri, Santali, Sora and Odia which in total are spoken by 5.04% of the population.

== Economy ==
The economy of Jorhat is primarily driven by the tea industry, with the city serving as an important centre for tea cultivation, processing and trade in Assam. Besides tea, Jorhat has a diversified economic base supported by agriculture, retail and wholesale trade, banking, education and healthcare services. Other significant economic activities include rice milling, handloom and handicrafts, small-scale industries and tourism, all of which contribute to the city's commercial importance in Upper Assam.

== Culture ==
Jorhat has rich contributions in the fields of arts, culture and tradition of the contemporary Assamese society. In 1896, Jorhat Theatre was established to perform cultural activities and dramas by some renowned people of the town. The Chandrakanta Handique Bhawan, the headquarters of Asam Sahitya Sabha was established in 1926. Jorhat has produced creative writers, historians and journalists. Birendra Kumar Bhattacharya, the first Assamese to win India's highest literature award, the Jnanpith Award, was from Jorhat.

== Media ==
In 1935, the first Assamese daily newspaper Dainik Batori was published from Jorhat by Raibahadur Siva Prasad Barooah. The daily newspapers which have Jorhat editions include Dainik Janambhumi, Amar Asom, Dainik Agradoot and Asomiya Khabar in Assamese, the Purbanchal Prohori in Hindi and The Telegraph in English. The Eastern Clarion was the first English daily published from the city, but it was ceased. Besides the dailies, a weekly newspaper Saptahik Janambhumi is also published from Jorhat. City Guide of Jorhat was the first yellow pages, published in July 1987. Jorhat has a radio broadcast station of All India Radio (AIR) located on the outskirts of the city at Garmur.

== District Court ==
District & Sessions Judge Court, Jorhat

The District & Sessions Judge of Upper Assam District, Jorhat, was established on November 15, 1948, and became permanent on April 1, 1953. The first District & Sessions Judge of Assam Valley, Upper Assam Districts, Jorhat, was Mr. S.K. Das, M.A., B.L. Currently, the district's territorial jurisdiction extends over two sub-divisions: Majuli Sub-Division and Titabar Sub-Division. Altogether, the District & Sessions Judge and the Chief Judicial Magistrate comprise 15 courts staffed by Judicial Officers of various grades. The District & Sessions Judge together with the Chief Judicial Magistrate Court Complex, Jorhat is situated in the heart of the city. The Present District & Sessions Judge as the head of the establishment is Smti. Barnali Mahanta. The present Chief Judicial Magistrate, Jorhat, the head of all the Criminal Courts is Sri Arup Jyoti Baishya.

== Transport ==
=== Air ===
The Jorhat Airport, commonly known as Rowriah Airport, is located at Rowriah, a suburb of Jorhat, about 7 kilometres (4.3 mi) from the city centre. The airport has flight connectivity to Kolkata and Delhi operated by IndiGo. It is controlled by the Airports Authority of India.

=== Rail ===
The first rail connectivity of Jorhat began during British era in 1885, when Jorehaut Provincial Railway, a narrow-gauge railway services became operational.

Jorhat is served by Jorhat Town railway station which lies on the Furkating-Jorhat-Mariani branch line of Tinsukia railway division. Mariani Junction railway station, the major railway junction of the district is about 18 km (11 mi) from Jorhat. It falls in the Lumding-Dibrugarh section and is well connected to all the large cities of the country by long-distance express trains.

=== Road ===
The Inter State Bus Terminus (ISBT) of Jorhat is at Kotoki Pukhuri, Tarajan and provides daily ASTC and private bus services to towns and cities across Assam and other parts of Northeast India. Auto-rickshaws, local cabs and cycle rickshaws are the main modes of public transport within the city.

=== Water ===
The daily ferry services connect the Nimati ghat with Kamalabari and Aphalamukh in Majuli. The Neamati multimodal waterways terminal on Brahmaputra National Waterway 2 in Jorhat district is part of the Bharatmala and Sagarmala projects.

== Education and research institutions ==
=== Research institutes ===
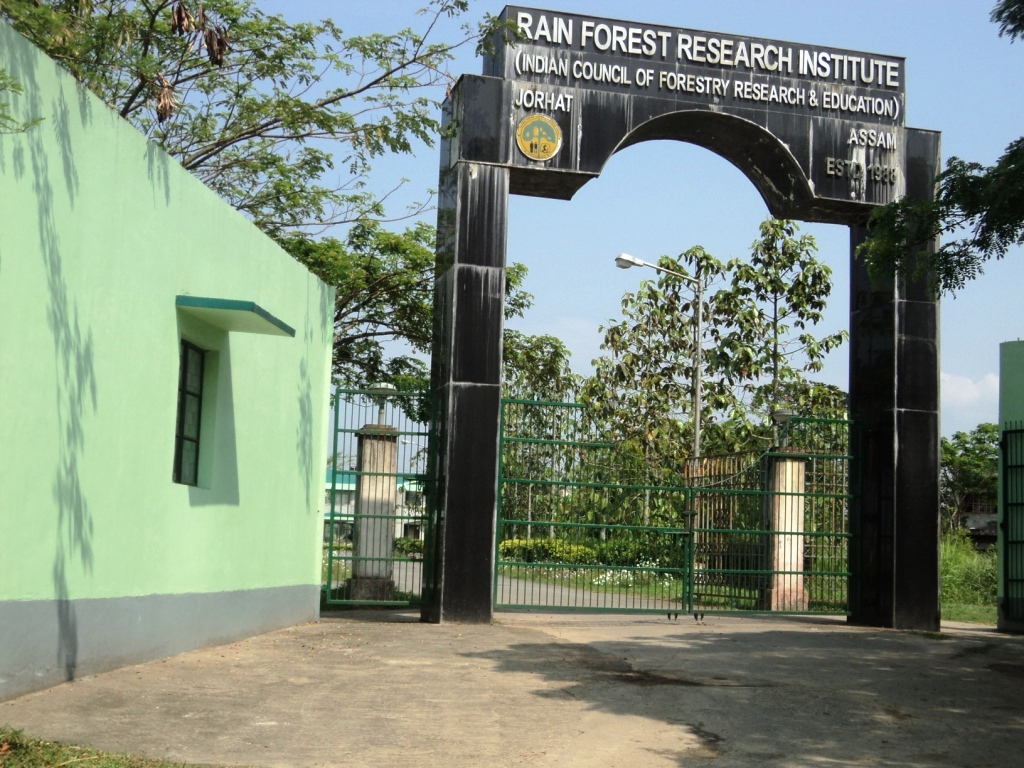
Main entrance of Rain Forest Research Institute

- North East Institute of Science and Technology, Jorhat (N.E.I.S.T.) (formerly R.R.L., Jorhat) under CSIR, Dept. of Science & Technology, Govt. of India
- Rain Forest Research Institute (R.F.R.I.), Jorhat under I.C.F.R.E., Min. of Environment & Forests, Govt. of India
- Tocklai Tea Research Institute, Tea Research Association (T.R.A.) Tocklai under Tea Research Association, Ministry of Commerce, Govt. of India
- Central Muga Eri Research & Training Institute, Lahdoigarh, under Central Silk Board
- College of Sericulture, under Assam Agriculture University
- Indian Grain Storage Management and Research Institute, Jorhat
- Institute of Biotechnology & Geotectonics Studies (INBIGS), ONGC Complex, Cinnamara, Jorhat - 785008

=== Universities ===
Main entrance of Assam Agricultural University

- Assam Agricultural University (A.A.U.), under Government of Assam
- Assam Women's University, under Government of Assam
- Jagannath Barooah University
- Kaziranga University

=== Technical institutes ===
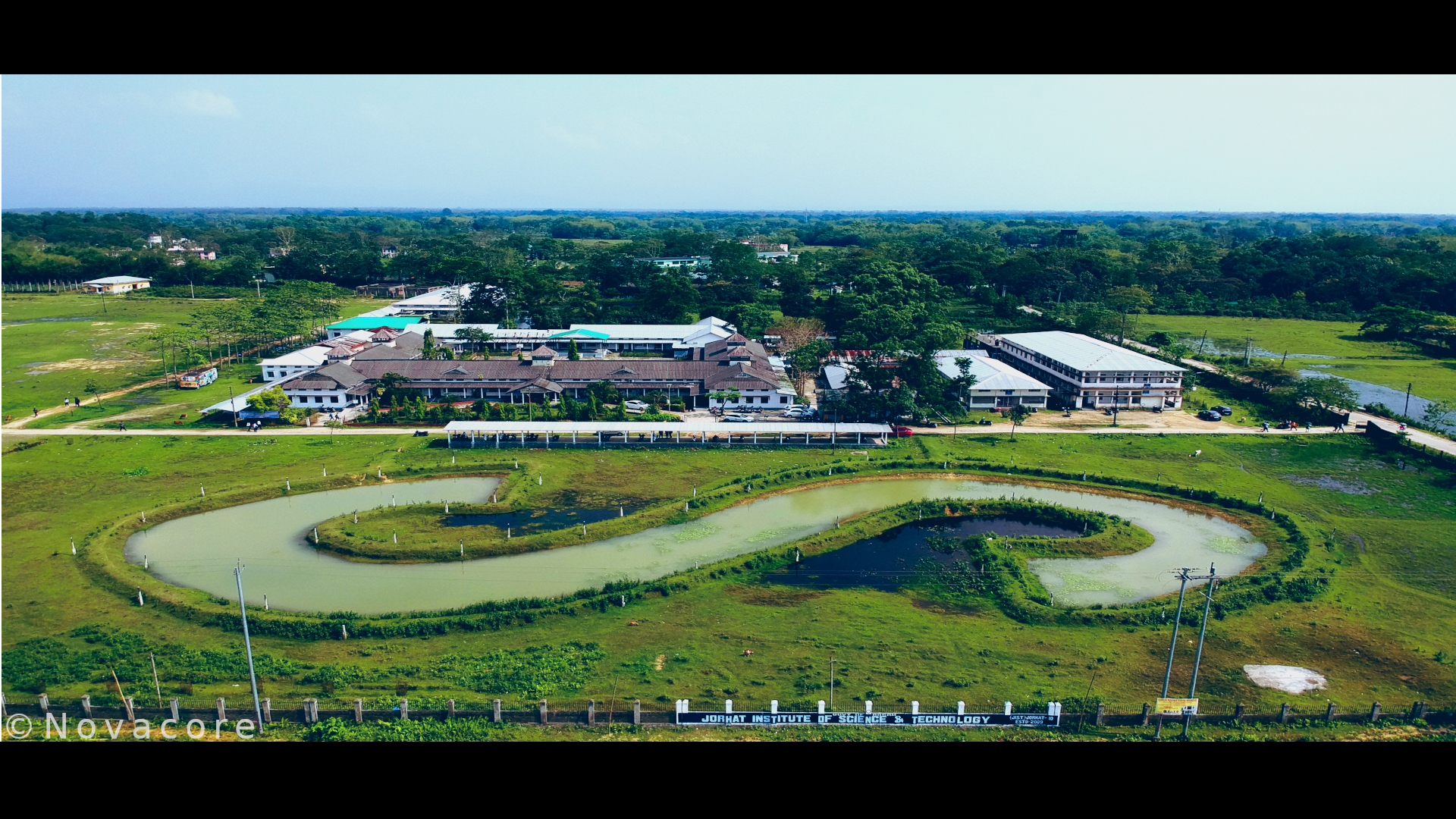
Jorhat Institute of Science and Technology

- HRH The Prince of Wales Institute of Engineering and Technology
- Jorhat Engineering College, Directorate of Technical Education, Government of Assam
- Jorhat Institute of Science & Technology, formerly Science College, Jorhat, Government of Assam
- Kaziranga University, Mohbondha, Jorhat
- North East Institute of Management Science, (opposite the N.E.I.S.T.), Jorhat

=== Design institute ===
- National Institute of Design, Jorhat

=== Medical institutes ===
- Jorhat Medical College and Hospital under the State Government of Assam
- Medical Institute Jorhat, under the Government of Assam.
- Dr. J.K. Saikia Homeopathic Medical College & Hospital, Jorhat

=== Training institute ===
- Institute of Advanced Studies in Education, Jorhat

=== Colleges ===
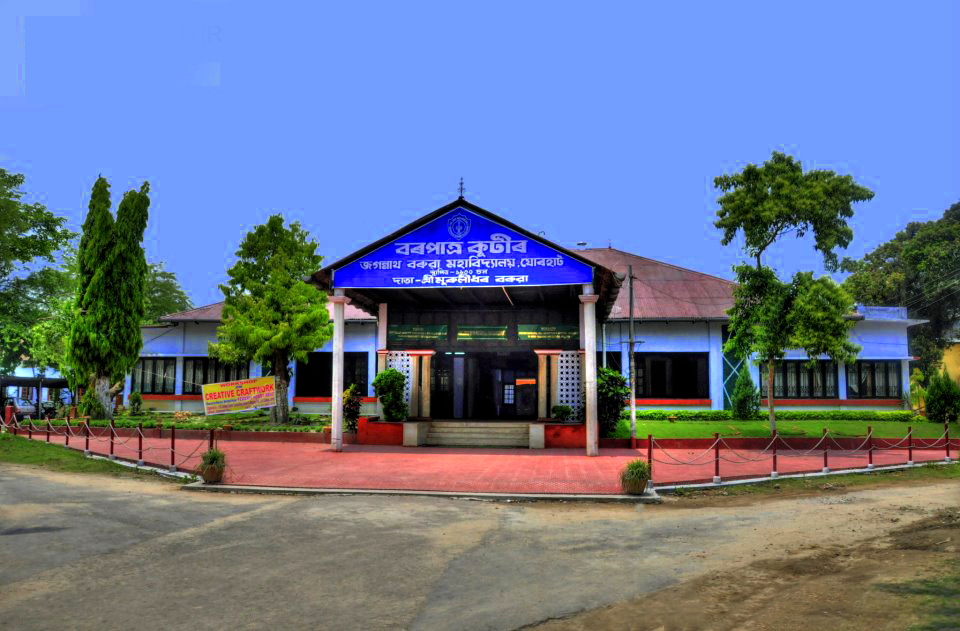
Jagannath Barooah College

- Bahona College
- CKB Commerce College
- D.C.B. Girls College
- Jorhat College
- Jorhat Institute of Science & Technology (formerly Jorhat Science College).
- Jorhat Kendriya Mahavidyalaya
- Jorhat Law College, M.G. Road, Jorhat
- Kakojan College, Kakojan
- Dr. Nobin Bordoloi College, Dhekiajuli

=== Schools ===
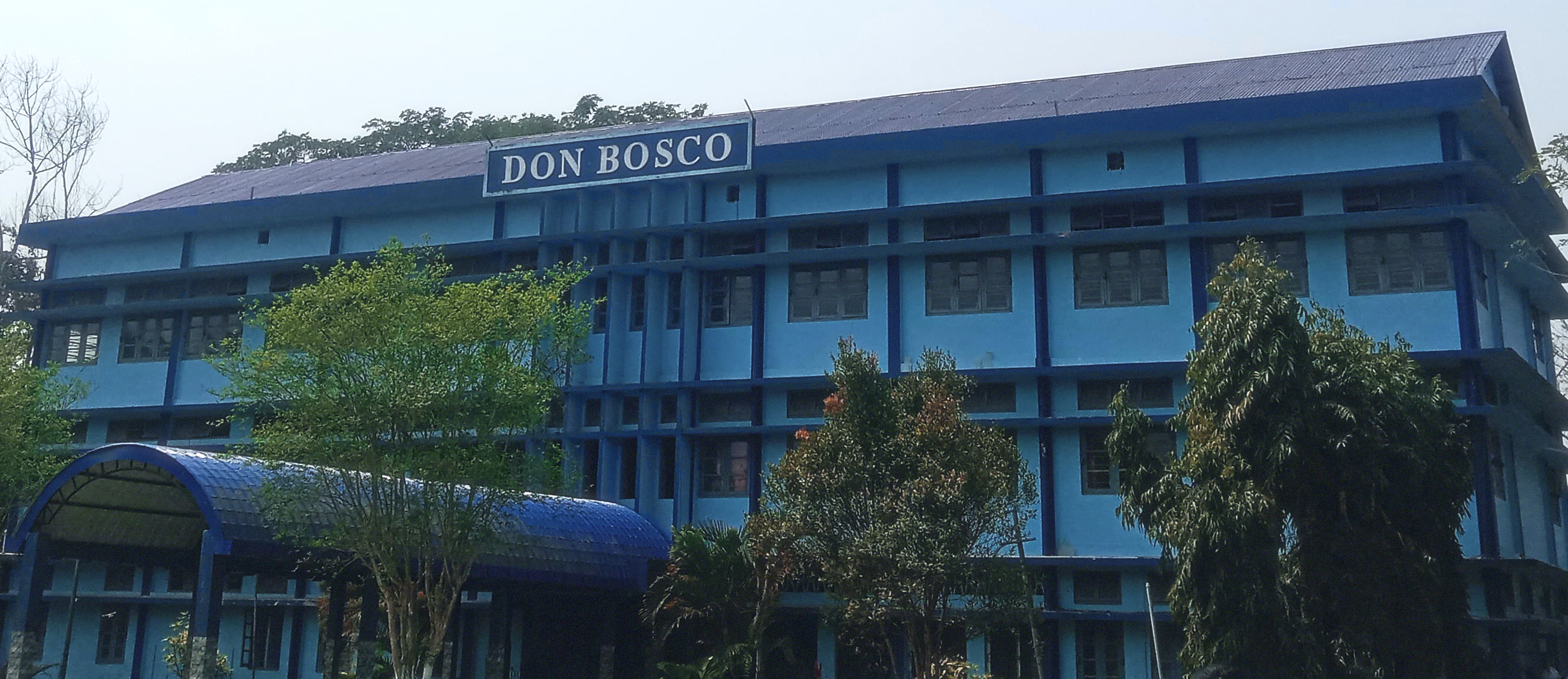
Don Bosco Baghchung Higher Secondary School

- Dipankar Vidyapith
- Don Bosco Higher Secondary School, Baghchung
- Jawahar Navodaya Vidyalaya, Jorhat
- Shemford Futuristic School, Choladhara
- Spring Dale High School
- Carmel Convent School, Cinnamara
- Crescent Academy
- Delhi Public School, Jorhat, Sarucharai Gharfalia
- Excellere Senior Secondary School
- Kendriya Vidyalaya (Indian Air Force Station), Jorhat-785005
- Kendriya Vidyalaya, NEIST (RRL), Jorhat-785006
- Kendriya Vidyalaya, (ONGC), Cinnamara
- Sankardev Seminary High School

== Sports ==
Established in 1950, Jorhat Stadium is a multi-purpose venue primarily used for cricket and football and is regarded as Assam’s oldest stadium. It has hosted few Ranji Trophy matches. The prominent football tournament ATPA Shield held every year in this venue since 1955. Jorhat Town Club used the stadium as its home ground for Assam State Premier League home matches. Other sporting venues near the stadium include JDSA Field, Kushal Konwar Indoor Stadium, Jorhat Swimming Society and Jorhat Tennis Club. The historic sporting venue Jorhat Gymkhana Club known for the century old annual horse race called Jorhat Races, which began in 1877. It has a golf course and a cricket ground.

== Politics ==
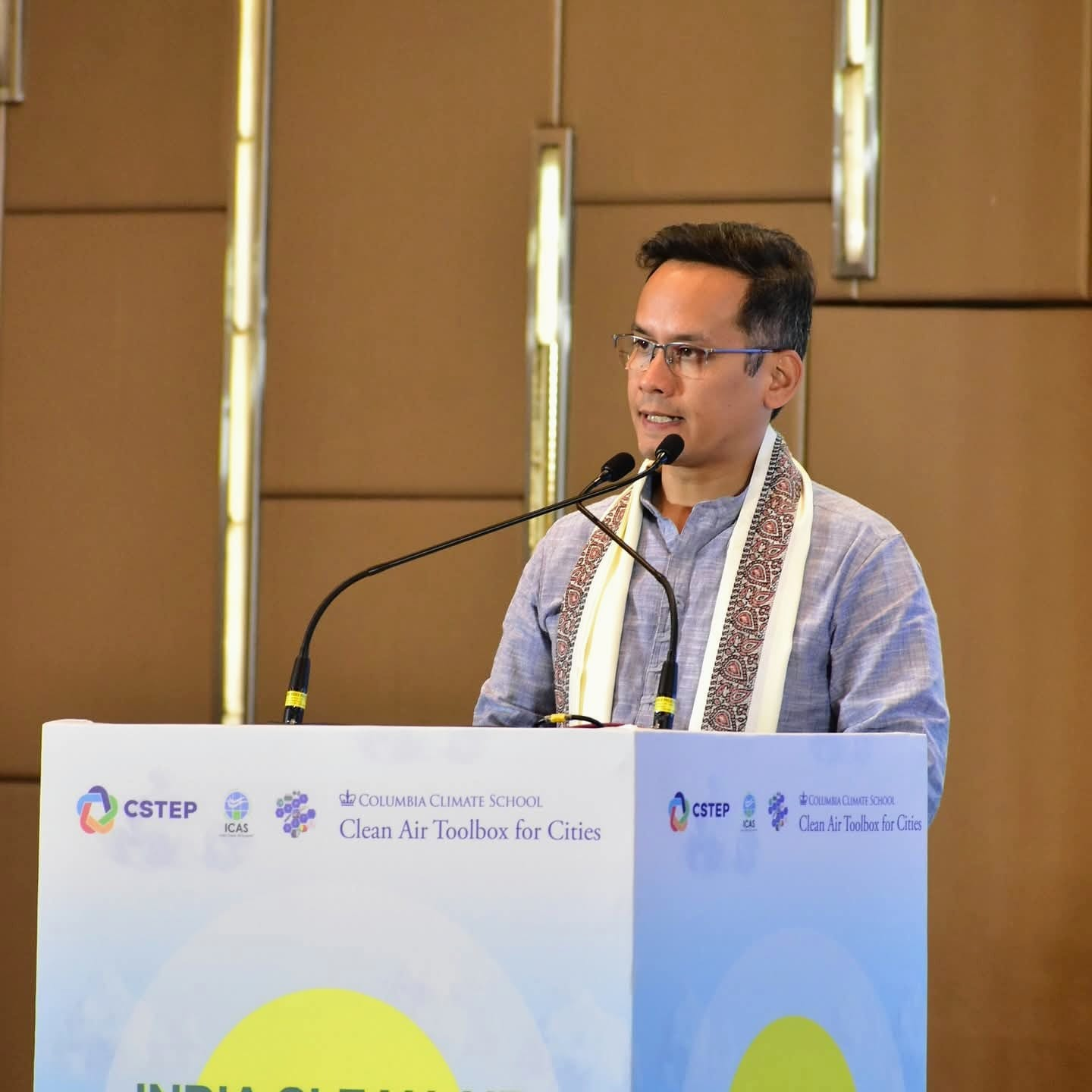
Gaurav Gogoi

Jorhat is part of Jorhat (Lok Sabha constituency). Gaurav Gogoi, Indian National Congress is the current Member of Parliament serving the 18th Lok Sabha from Jorhat, Assam.

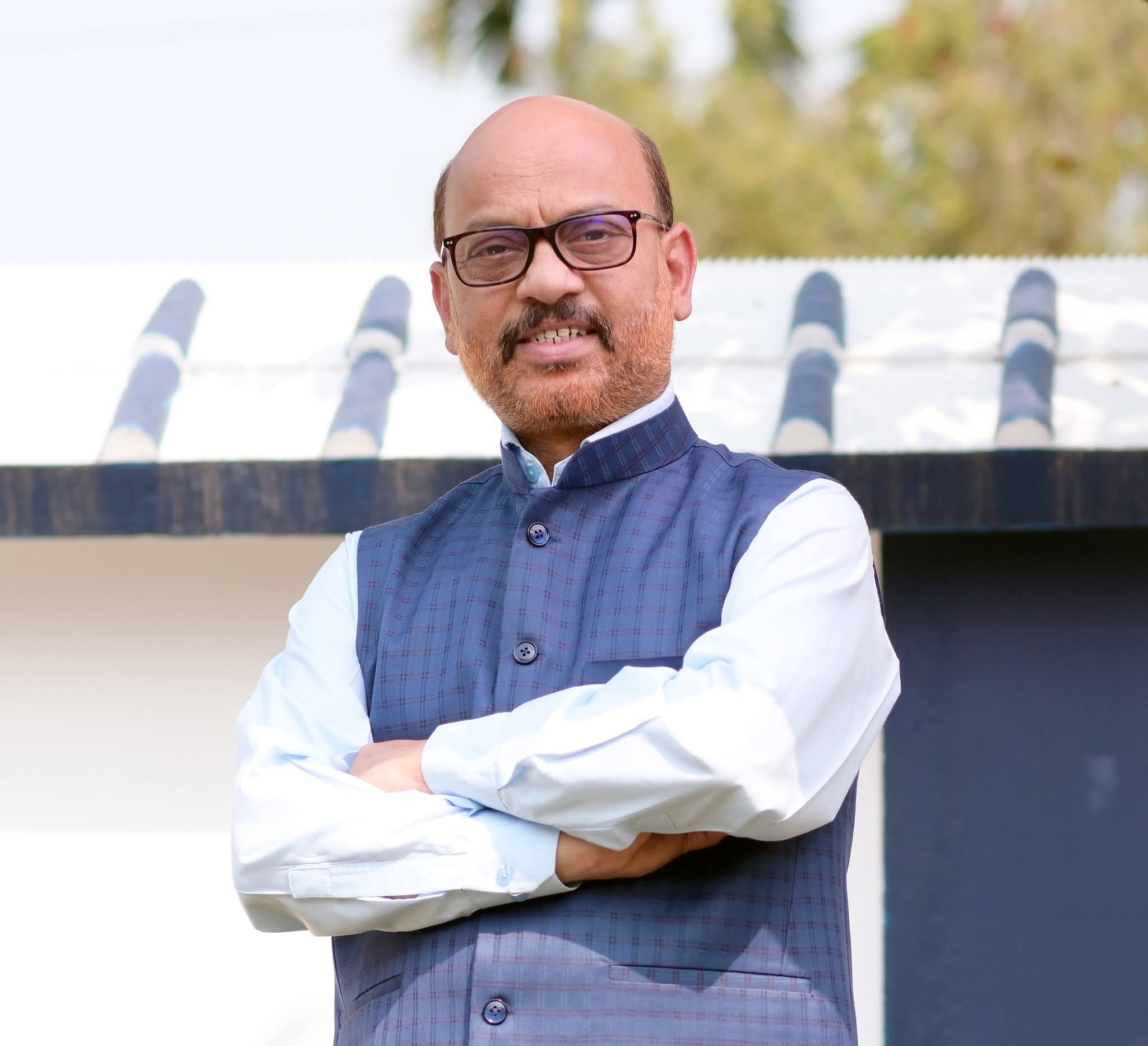
Hitendra Nath Goswami

Hitendra Nath Goswami of BJP is the incumbent MLA from Jorhat assembly constituency.

== Places of interest ==
Jorhat has several historical, cultural and natural attractions. Notable places of interest include Nimati Ghat, Sukapha Samannay Kshetra, Raja Maidam, Dhekiakhowa Bor Namghar, Kaziranga Golf Resort, Thengal Bhavan, Burhigosani Devalay, Lachit Borphukan's Maidam, Rajmao Pukhuri, Tocklai Tea Research Institute, the Jorhat Gymkhana Club and Swaraj Udyan. These sites reflect the city's Ahom heritage, tea industry, religious traditions and colonial-era legacy.

== Notable people ==
- Hemendra Prasad Barooah, Tea planter and industrialist
- Jagannath Barooah, Scholar, tea planter, philanthropist
- Ranjit Barthakur, Businessman and chairman of Rajasthan Royals
- Amulya Barua, Assamese poet
- Ananda Chandra Barua, Assamese poet, dramatist, former president of Asam Sahitya Sabha
- Chandradhar Barua, Assamese poet, playwright, former president of Assam Sahitya Sabha, represented Assam in the Round Table Conference
- Joi Barua, Assamese and Bollywood singer
- Birendra Kumar Bhattacharya, The first Jnanpith Award-winning Assamese writer
- Hiren Bhattacharyya, Assamese poet
- Bijoya Chakravarty, Former Lok Sabha MP from Guwahati (Born in Jorhat)
- Ananda Chandra Dutta, Botanist
- Zubeen Garg, Assamese and Bollywood singer
- Akhil Gogoi, Prominent social activist, MLA from Sivasagar
- Ganesh Gogoi, Assamese poet
- Tarun Gogoi, former Chief Minister of Assam.
- Gaurav Gogoi, MP of Jorhat and the current Deputy Leader of INC in the Lok Sabha
- Hitendra Nath Goswami, Former Speaker of Assam Legislative Assembly, MLA of Jorhat
- Rana Goswami, Former MLA of Jorhat
- Jitendra Nath Goswami, Chief scientist of Chandrayaan -1
- Bijoy Krishna Handique, Former Union Minister
- Krishna Kanta Handique, Sanskrit scholar, Indologist and philanthropist
- Jayanta Nath, Singer, Composer, Music Director
- Jadav Payeng, The "Forest Man of India"
- Prastuti Porasor, Assamese film actress
- Anuradha Sharma Pujari, Assamese journalist and author
- Tim Severin, British explorer, historian, and writer was born in Jorhat
- Himanta Biswa Sarma, The current Chief Minister of Assam and MLA from Jalukbari was born in Jorhat
- Anwara Taimur, First Woman Chief Minister of Assam

== See also ==
- Jorhat Municipal Board
- Jorehaut Provincial Railway
- Jorhat Assembly constituency
- Jorhat Lok Sabha constituency
- Timeline of Jorhat
- Golaghat
- Sivasagar
