= Assam Police =

Law enforcement agency for Assam, India

- Assam Police badge
- Common name: Assam Police
- Abbreviation: AP
- Motto: জনহিতজনসেৱাৰ্থে JONOHIT JONXEWARTHE ( Always at your service)

Agency overview
- Formed: 1826
- Employees: 0
- Annual budget: ₹8,291 crore (US$890 million) (2025-26 est.)

Jurisdictional structure
- Operations jurisdiction: Assam, IN
- Assam Police jurisdictional area
- Area: 78438 km2
- Population: 31,205,576
- Legal jurisdiction: State of Assam
- General nature: Local civilian police

Operational structure
- Overseen by: Government of Assam
- Headquarters: Office of the Director General of Police, Ulubari, Guwahati - 781007
- Elected officer responsible: Dr. Himanta Biswa Sarma, Chief Minister
- Agency executive: Harmeet Singh, IPS, Director General of Police
- Parent agency: Home Department, Govt of Assam

Website
- assampolice.assam.gov.in/Citizen/Login.aspx

The Assam Police is the law enforcement agency for the state of Assam in India. The regular police force was initiated in Assam by the British after the Treaty of Yandaboo to maintain the law and order. It functions under the Department of Home Affairs, Assam. The headquarters of Assam Police is situated at Ulubari in the state capital Guwahati.

== Organizational structure ==
Assam Police comes under direct control of Department of Home Affairs, Government of Assam. The Assam Police is headed by a Director General of Police (DGP). The current DGP of the Assam Police is Harmeet Singh, IPS

- Assam police forces are organized into police ranges, headed by an inspector general deputy inspector general, who controls several police districts.
- The police district is the fulcrum of state police activity and each district is headed by a superintendent. In many states a superintendent is assisted by one or more additional superintendents or deputy superintendents. Generally, a police district is same as a revenue district of a state.
- The police district is divided into police sub-divisions under the command of a deputy superintendent of subdivision police officer.
- The police sub-division is made up of one or more police circles, and is under the command of an inspector, often referred to as the circle inspector.
- Under the police circles are the police stations, generally under the control of a sub-inspector.

Assam state police force also maintains its own Reserve Armed police force (special armed police and armed police) which is responsible for emergencies and crowd control issues. They are generally activated only on orders from the rank of DIG and higher-level authorities.

The armed constabulary do not usually come into contact with the general public unless they are assigned to VIP duty, counter-insurgency operations, riot control or to maintain law and order during fairs, festivals, athletic events, elections, and natural disasters.

They may also be sent to quell outbreaks of student or labour unrest, organised crime, to maintain guard posts and to participate in anti-terrorist operations. Depending on the type of assignment, the Armed Police force may carry lathis or lethal weapons.

Assam Police also have an elite commando group known as the "Black Panthers" equipped with modern weapons and technology for anti-terrorist operations and VVIP protection.

== List of DGP of Assam Police ==
List of Director General of Assam Police
Nos.	Name	Portrait	Home Minister	Appointment date	Retirement date
	Prakash Singh		Hiteswar Saikia	1991	1991
	Harekrishna Deka		Prafulla Kumar Mahanta	2000	2003
	Harekrishna Deka		Tarun Gogoi		
	P. V. Sumant		Tarun Gogoi	2003	2005
	Deepak Narayan Dutta		Tarun Gogoi	2005	2006
	Ghanashyam Murari Shrivastava		Tarun Gogoi	2008	2009
	Shankar Prasad Barua		Tarun Gogoi	2009	2011
	Jayanta Narayan Choudhury		Tarun Gogoi	2011	2014
	Khagen Sarma		Tarun Gogoi	2014	2015
	Mukesh Sahay		Tarun Gogoi	2015	2018
	Kuladhar Saikia		Sarbananda Sonowal	2018	2019
	Bhaskar Jyoti Mahanta		Sarbananda Sonowal	2019	2023
	Bhaskar Jyoti Mahanta		Himanta Biswa Sarma	2019	2023
	Gyanendra Pratap Singh		Himanta Biswa Sarma	2023	2025
	Harmeet Singh(Acting)		Himanta Biswa Sarma	2025	Incumbent

== Branches ==
With the growth and development of the police administration in the post-colonial era, a number of new branches were established to meet the increasing demands of law and order. Some of these branches are:

1. Bureau of Investigation (Economic Offenses)
2. Special Branch
3. Criminal Investigation Department
4. Assam Police Border Organization
5. Assam Police Radio Organization
6. Assam River Police Organization
7. Directorate of Forensic Science. Assam
8. Assam Village Defense Organization.
9. Fire & Emergency Services, Assam
10. State Disaster Response Force, Assam
11. Assam Police Highway Patrol Unit, (to be Introduced)

The Assam Police has grown from strength to strength during the last two decade. In 1980 it had a force of 40,290 and at the end of the 20th century its numerical strength stands at 60,721.

== Battalion and Reserved Forces ==
Assam Police Battalion (APBN)

Assam Police Battalion personnels are engaged in the onerous task of helping the district police in maintaining Law and Order, besides guarding the vital installations round the clock, including Counter Insurgency, Riot control . They are also engaged in other static security duties.

Year	Battalion	Headquarters	District	Notes
1948	1st APBN	Ligripukhuri	Sivasagar	Engaged in manning 11 Border outpost
1952	2nd APBN	Makum	Tinsukia	Engaged in Law and Order duties besides manning 4 Border outpost
1957	3rd APBN	Titabor	Jorhat	Engaged in Law and Order duties besides manning 6 Border outpost
1962	4th APBN	Kahilipara	Kamrup	Engaged in Law and Order duties besides manning 4 Border outpost
1964	5th APBN	Sontilla	North Cachar Hills	Engaged in Law and Order duties
1965	6th APBN	Kathal	Cachar	Engaged in Law and Order duties besides manning 6 Border outpost
1986	7th APBN	Choraikhola	Kokrajhar	Engaged in Law and Order duties
1966	8th APBN	Abhayapuri	Bongaigaon	Engaged in the guarding of vital installations and Law and Order duties
1970	9th APBN	Barhampur	Nagaon	Engaged in manning 6 Border outpost, important railway bridges, other security and Law and Order duties
1973	10th APBN	Kahilipara	Kamrup	Engaged in important security duties
1978	11th APBN	Dergaon	Golaghat	Engaged in important security and Law and Order duties besides manning 7 Border outpost
1980	12th APBN	Jamugurihat	Sonitpur	Engaged in manning 2 Border outpost, guarding vital installations and other Law and Order duties
1987	13th APBN	Lilabari	North Lakhimpur	Engaged in Law and Order duties besides manning 4 Border outpost
1987	14th APBN	Dualasal	Nalbari	Engaged in Law and Order duties besides guarding vital installations

Indian Reserve Battalion (IRBN)

The raising of CPMF can only meet the regular and increasing demand of the state. It was decided to augment the strengths of the state governments. It is in this context that I.R. Battalions were raised in Assam with the assistance of the central government. The central government however reserves the first right to call on these battalions as and when required for deployment outside the state. The personnel of the battalion are engaged in both operational as well as law and order duties.

Year	Battalion	Headquarters	District
1994	15th AP IRBN	Eraligool	Karimganj
1994	16th AP IRBN	Bormonipur	Morigaon
2001	19th AP IRBN	Tengakhat	Dibrugarh
2001	20th AP IRBN	Panbari	Dhubri
2006	21st AP IRBN	Katlicherra	Hailakandi
2006	22nd AP IRBN	Likabali	Dhemaji
2008	23rd AP IRBN	Siloni	Karbi Anglong
2009	24th AP IRBN	Eraligool	Karimganj
2009	25th AP (ONGC) IRBN	Ligiripukhuri	Sivasagar

Assam Police Task Force (APTF)

APTF Battalion was raised as a speciality peace keeping force to tackle the instances of communal and group violence. The personnel of this force were posted in vulnerable areas and minority pockets, so that any sign of communal disharmony could be quickly countered and prevented from flaring up into a major communal violence. This force has functioned effectively as an emergency task force.

Year	Battalion	Headquarters	District
1984	1st APTF Battalion	Dakurvita	Goalpara
1984	2nd APTF Battalion	Lumding	Hojai
1984	3rd APTF Battalion	Khajuabeel	Udalguri
1985	4th APTF Battalion	Howly	Barpeta

Commando Battalion

Year	Unit	Headquarters	District	Notes
1996	Black Panthers Commando	Mandakata	North Guwahati	Specially trained commando Battalion to deal with Counterinsurgency operations
2012	Veerangana Commando	Kahilipara	Guwahati	Specialised women commando battalion engaged to tackle crime against women

State Disaster Response Force

State Disaster Response Force or SDRF ASSAM is a Specialised force of Assam Police raised with the objective of carrying out relief and rescue operations in a quick and effective manner during any natural and man-made disaster.

There are 05 Companies of SDRF Battalion In Different Parts of Assam.

Year	Unit	Headquarters	District	Notes
2011	1st Company SDRF Battalion	Lilabari	North Lakhimpur	Formed out of 13th AP(Bn)
2011	2nd Company SDRF Battalion	Kathal	Cachar	Formed out of 6th AP(Bn)
2011	3rd Company SDRF Battalion	Sila	North Guwahati	
2020	4th Company SDRF Battalion	Abhayapuri	Bongaigaon	
2020	5th Company SDRF Battalion	Dergaon	Golaghat	

== Medals and awards ==
Officers of Assam Police got many awards and medals for their outstanding and meritorious service. Many officers and men of the Assam Police, laid down their lives in the fight against extremism since 1986.

Kirti Chakra

Year	Rank	Name	Notes
2013	Inspector	Lohit Sonowal	Posthumously awarded for eliminating Two ULFA militants in Tinsukia
2016	Constable	Gautam Koch	Posthumously awarded for eliminating militants in Dhansiri Outpost

Shaurya Chakra

Year	Rank	Name	Notes
2007	Superintendent of Police	Pankaj Sharma	Eliminated NSCN militants from Assam-Nagaland Border in 2004

Jeevan Raksha Padak

Year	Rank	Name	Notes
2024	Officer-in-Charge	Samarjit Basumatary	Civilian rescue from Longai River, Karimganj

List of receivers for 2011 President's Police Medal for Gallantry:

- Constable Nirmal Chandra Deka.(Posthumously)

Police Medal for gallantry on republic day 2017.

- Pranab Kumar Gogoi Circle Inspector.
- Utpal Borah.Sub-Inspector
- Anurag Agarwal.SP
- Prakash Sonowal.SDPO
- Imdad Ali.SDPO
- Mahananda Gauria.Constable
- Ghanakanta Malakar.Constable
- Hemkanta Boro.Constable
- Ratneshwar Kalita.Constable
- Bapan Roy

== Equipment ==
All the equipment for the Assam Police are manufactured indigenously by the Indian Ordnance Factories, Ministry of Defence, Government of India.

Name	Country of origin	Type	Status
Pistol Auto 9mm 1A	India	Semi-automatic pistol	Standard issue
Glock 17	Austria	Semi-automatic pistol	Standard issue
Heckler & Koch MP5	West Germany	Submachine gun	Current
Sterling submachine gun.	United Kingdom	Submachine gun	Phased out
Lee–Enfield	United Kingdom	Rifle	Phased out
1A SLR	Belgium	Rifle	Phased out
INSAS	India	Rifle	Standard issue
AKM	India	Rifle	Current
AK-47	Bulgaria	Rifle	
Bren light machine gun.	United Kingdom	Machine gun	
PK	Soviet Union	Machine gun	In limited quantity

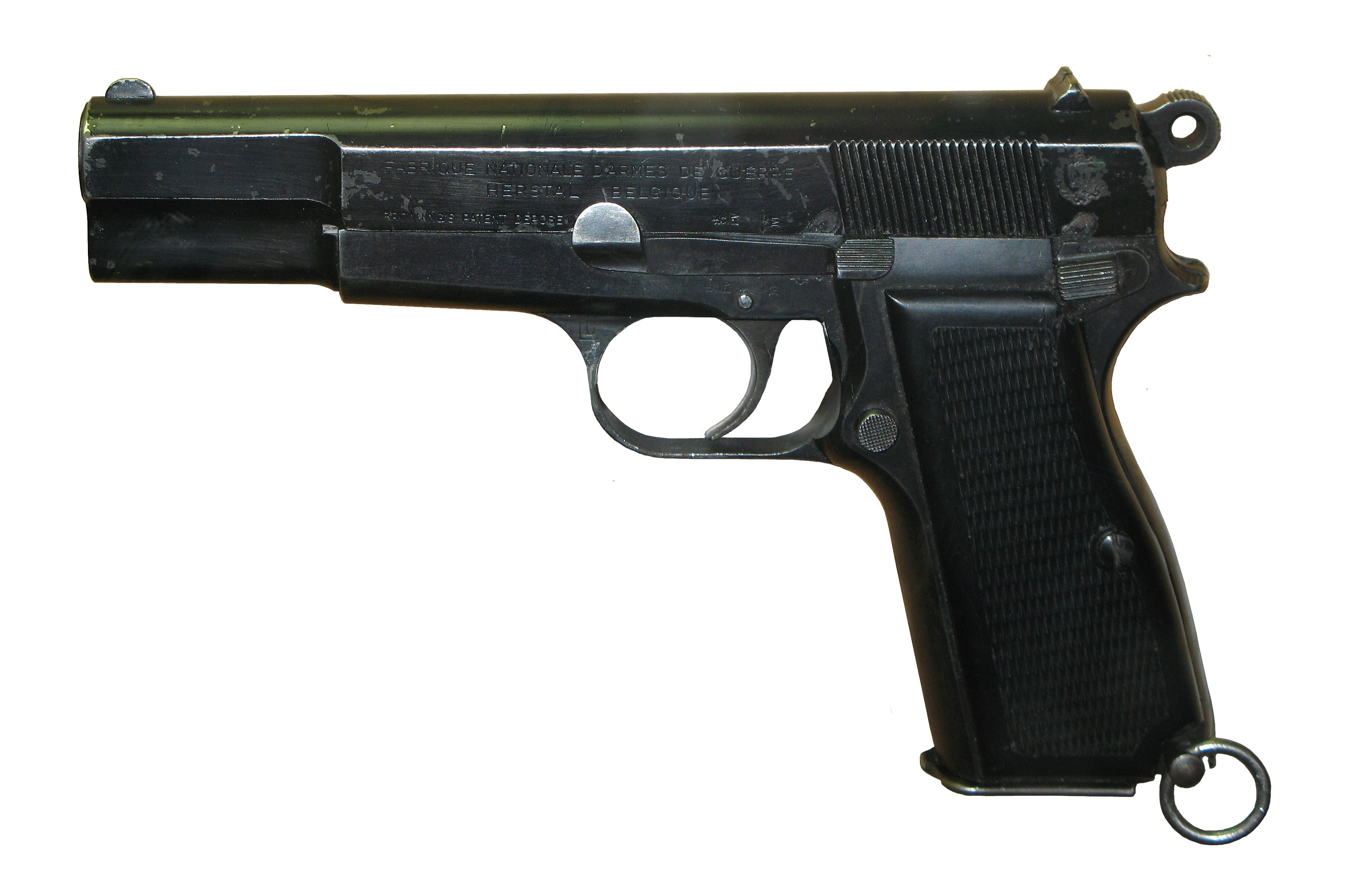
Standard Officer's Service Gun

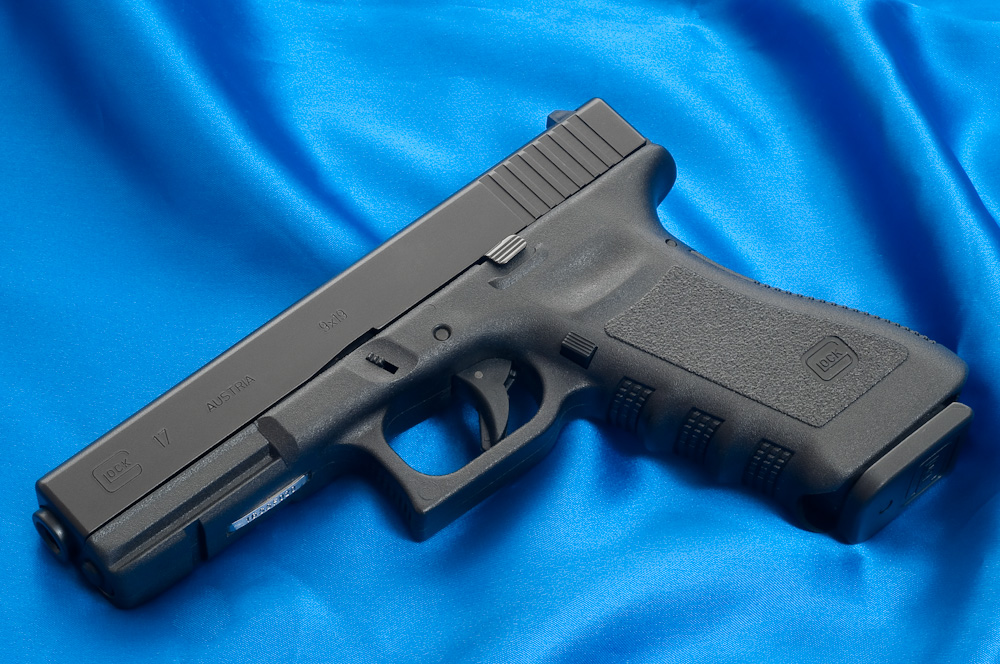
Glock 17 Standard Officer's Service Gun

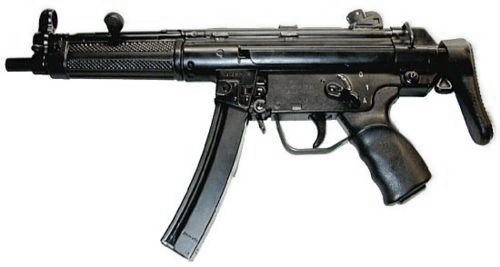

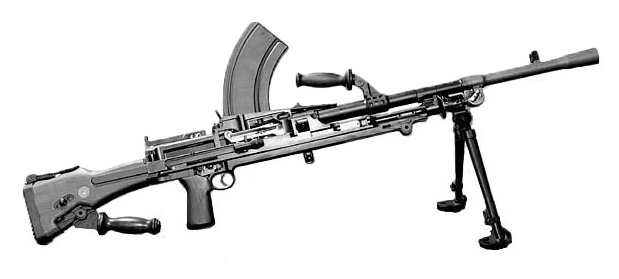

=== Vehicles ===
- Toyota Innova
- Mahindra Scorpio
- Tata Safari (VIP Protection & Convoy)
- HM Ambassador (Being phased Out)

Vehicles Used for General Duty purpose.

- Mahindra Bolero
- Maruti Gypsy .
- Tata Sumo .
- Tata 407 Trucks .
- Buses for transportation of troops.
- Bajaj Pulsar Bikes. (Patrolling)
- Royal Enfield
- Maruti Omni. (For Guwahati City traffic only)
- Mahindra Commander Jeep. (Phased out)
- Tata Spacio.
- Mahindra Legend
- Mahindra Invader
- Mahindra Thar
- Vajra by VRDE for Riot control
- Varun by VRDE for Riot control
- Chevrolet Tavera Traffic Interceptor vehicle
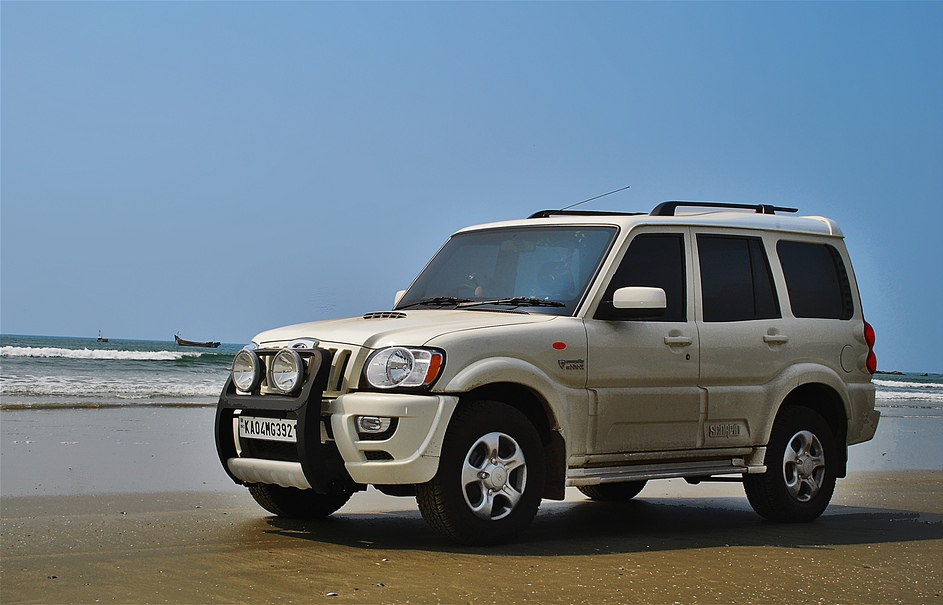
Scorpio

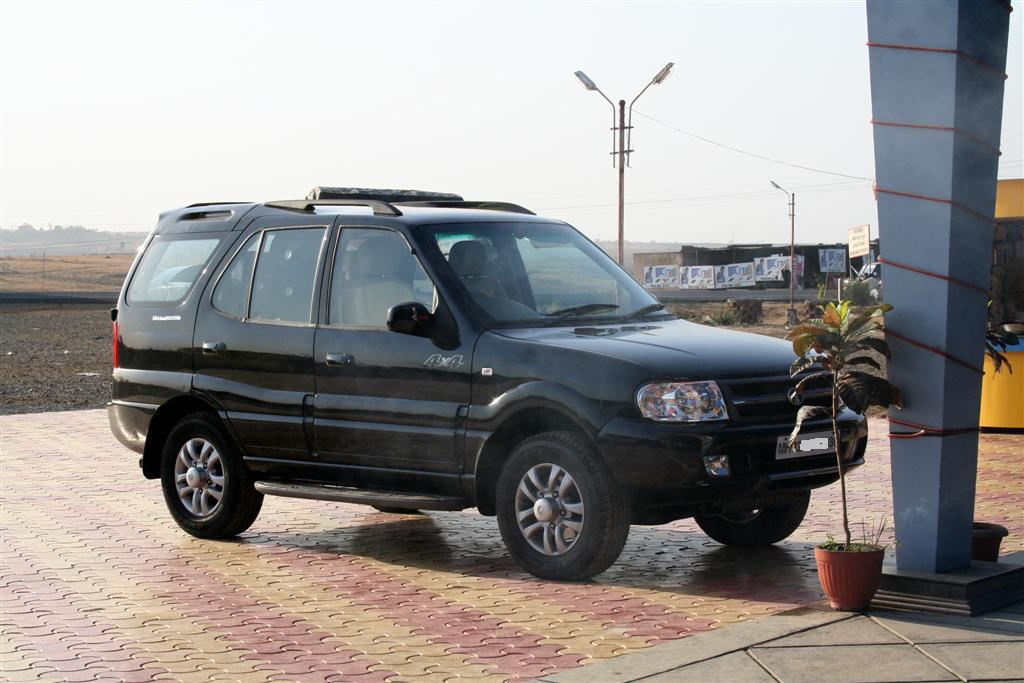
Safari

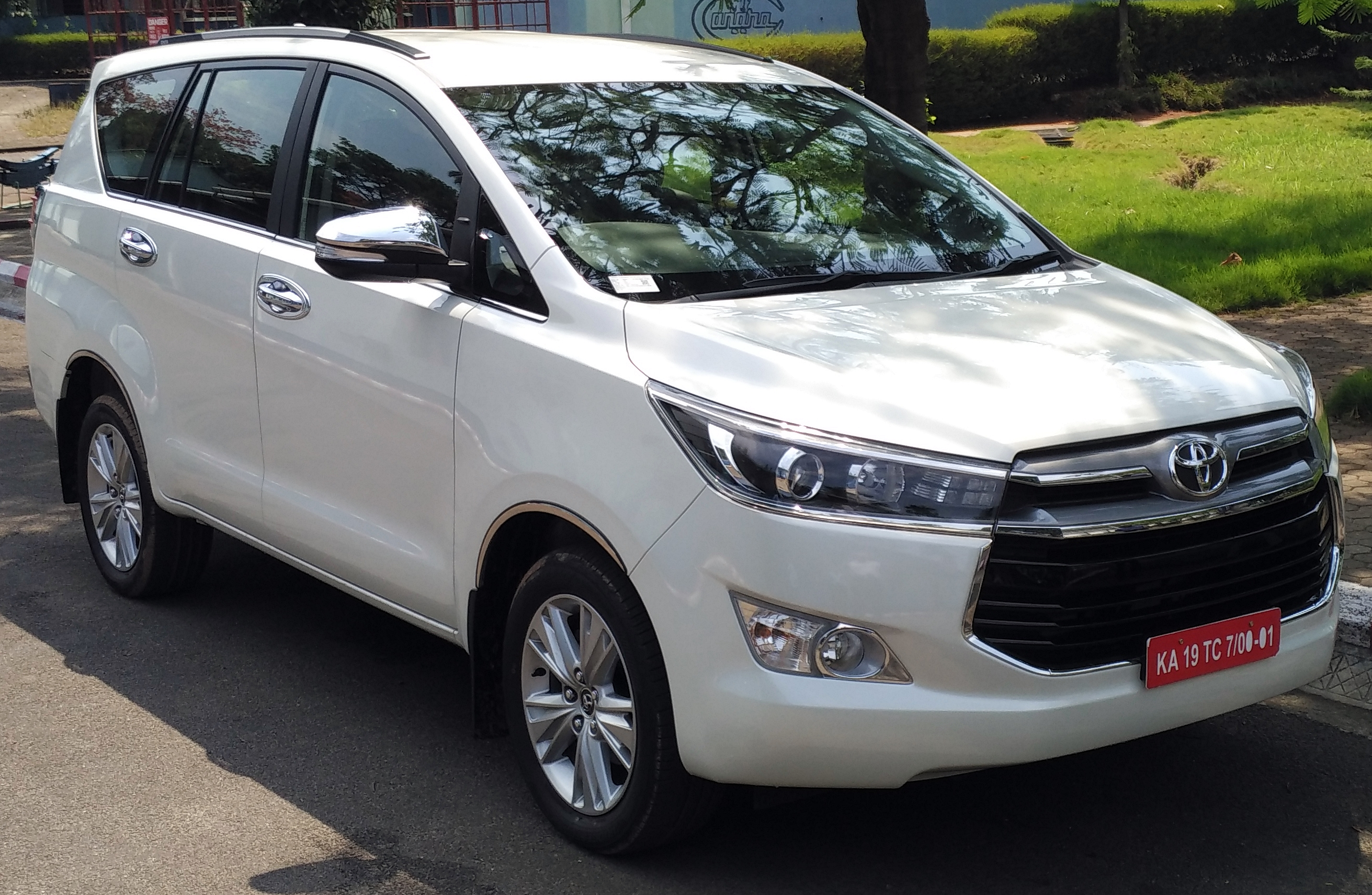
Innova

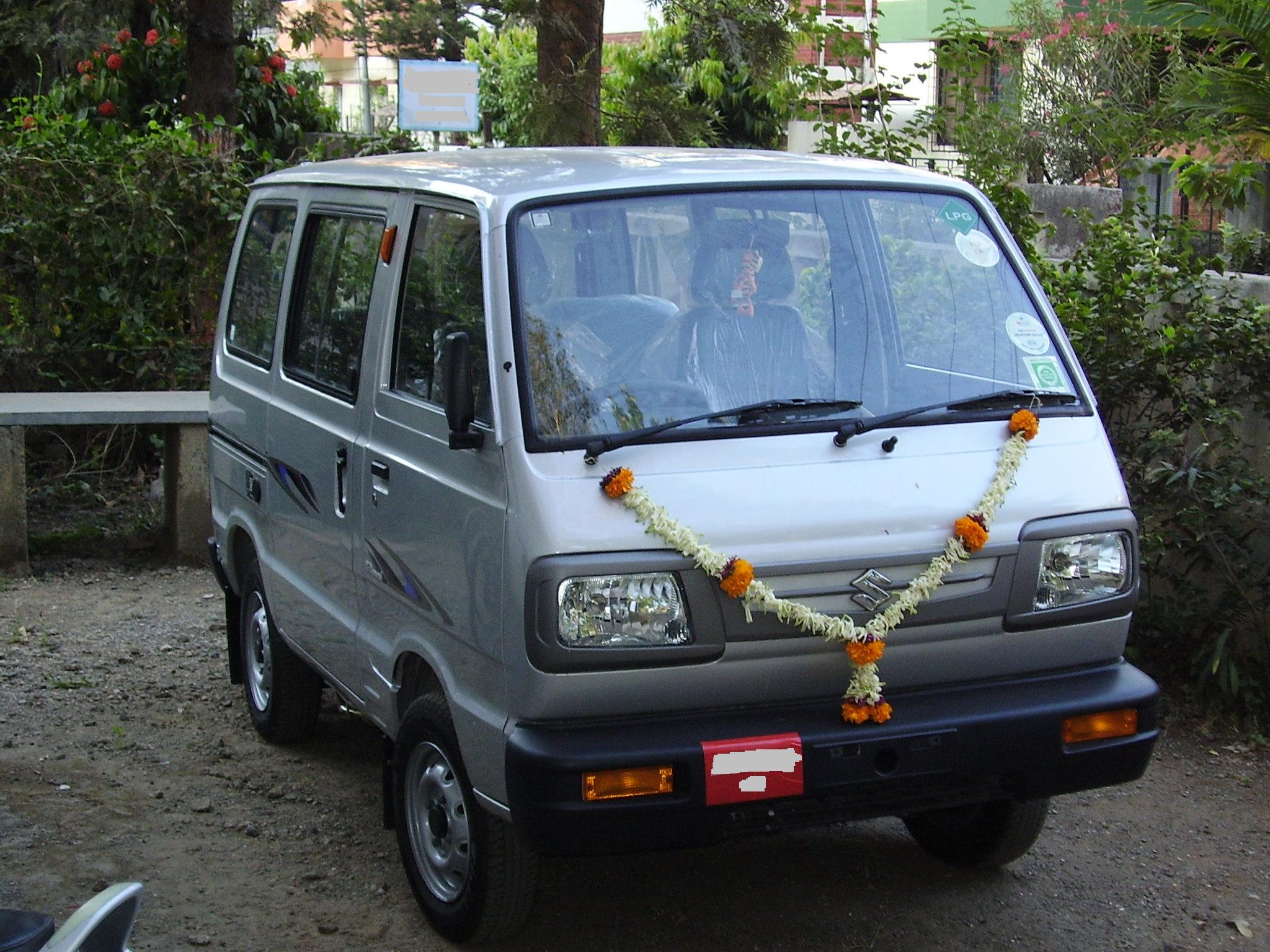

== Controversies ==
There are many allegations and court cases of police brutality, custodial death, human rights violations, fake encounter killing, extortion, filling fake cases to harass the general public, corruption filed against the Assam Police. Because of the corrupt politicians the police have always complained not being able to function properly. Different organizations and their open extortion are known to the public and the police also have been alleged to have a fair share on those. Another main acquisition of Assam police in the present is that they are the friends of thieves, kidnappers and murderers rather than the public and it is said that the police has a better share in those crime money. Corruption of the organization is at peak with people fearing to go to the police against a crime as they need to pay money to file an FIR or take actions. There have also been reported human rights abuses against the Naga people, which has incited and increased Naga nationalism.

=== Assam Police Fake Encounters ===
Starting May 2021 several fake police encounters took place in the state. National Human Rights Commission has been approached with human rights violation in the alleged fake encounters. On 21 December a Public Interest Litigation petition was filed by Arif Jwadder before the Gauhati High Court demanding independent investigation over the fake encounters killings. Till date 51 deaths and 139 injuries have occurred till date. The petitioner moved the Supreme Court after the Gauhati High Court refused to institute independent enquiry.

The deaths and injury have crossed more than 171 from May 2021 till August 2022.

On 28 May 2025 the Supreme Court of India in its judgement has ordered the Assam Human Rights Commission to inquire and investigate encounters in the petition case titled Arif Md Yeasin Jwadder vs state of assam & ors. filed by advocate Arif Jwadder against the judgement of the Gauhati High Court. The judgement was earlier reserved by the supreme court on 25 February 2025.
