= Bhaskar Jyoti Mahanta =

Indian police officer

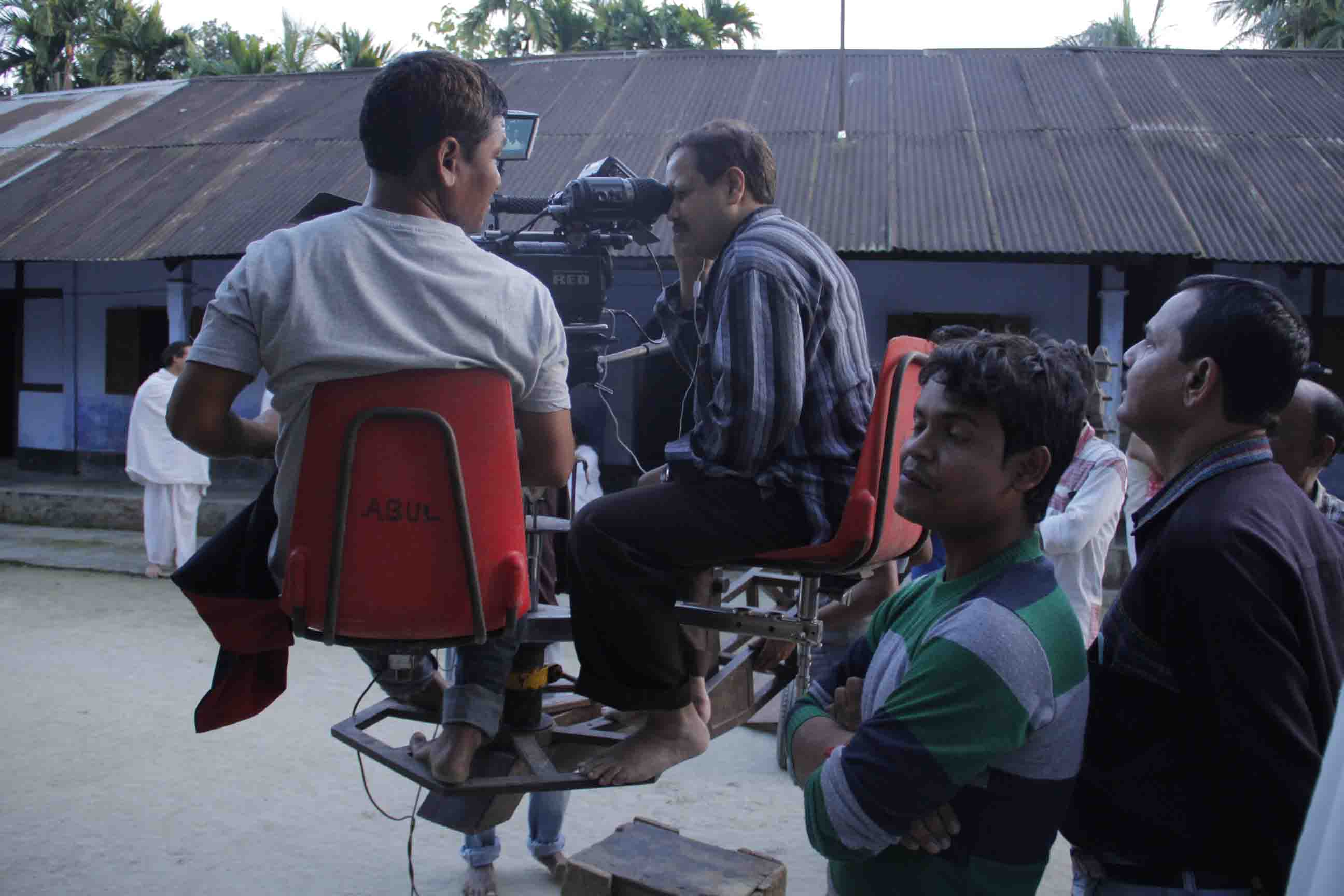
- Mahanta during a film shooting
- Born: 24 January 1963 (age 63); Sivasagar, Assam
- Education: Ramjas College; Delhi University
- Police career
- Department: Assam Police
- Rank: Director general of police

Bhaskar Jyoti Mahanta (born 24 January 1963) is a retired IPS officer of Assam-Meghalaya. He was the Director General of Assam Police from 2019 till 2023, and had previously served as the special Director General of Border & sdrf Assam. He retired on 31 January 2023. Post retirement, he served as Chief Information Commissioner of Assam Information Commission from August 2023 onwards till November 2025.

== Early life ==
Bhaskar Jyoti Mahanta was born on 24 January 1963 in Konwerpur Gohain Gaon, Sivasagar, Assam to Lilakanta Mahanta(1931-2023) and Nirupama Mahanta.

== Education ==
Mahanta did his matriculation from Govt. Higher Secondary School, Sivasagar in the year 1977 and achieved all Assam second rank in the higher secondary examination with highest mark in Economics from Vivekanda Vidyalaya, Digboi. He pursued Bachelor of Arts in Political Science from Ramjas College, Delhi and then Master of Arts in Social Works from Delhi School of Social Work. He was selected for Indian Information Service in the 1986 and for Indian Police Service in 1987.

== Police career ==
Mahanta, a 1988 batch Assam-Meghalaya cadre IPS, has worked in various departments in different capacity. Mahanta has served in below key positions for both Union and Assam Governments (Police)

- Director General of Police of Assam
- Joint secretary in the department of Ministry of Heavy Industries and Public Enterprises
- General of Training & Armed Police in Assam
- Additional director general of police of Administration
- Additional director general of police of Railway police
- Special Director General of Border
- Special Director General of Fire and Emergency services Assam
- Special Director General of Sdrf Assam
- SP in several districts of Assam

== Film career ==
Mahanta directed Yugadrashta, an Assamese language short film based on the life of Sentineler and freedom fighter Pitambar Deva Goswami.

== See also ==
- Kuladhar Saikia
