= APTF =

APTF may be:

- Advanced Placement Test Fee
- American Public Transportation Foundation or American Public Transit Foundation
- Assam Police Task Force
