= Mercedes-Benz T2 =

Transporter manufactured by Daimler-Benz

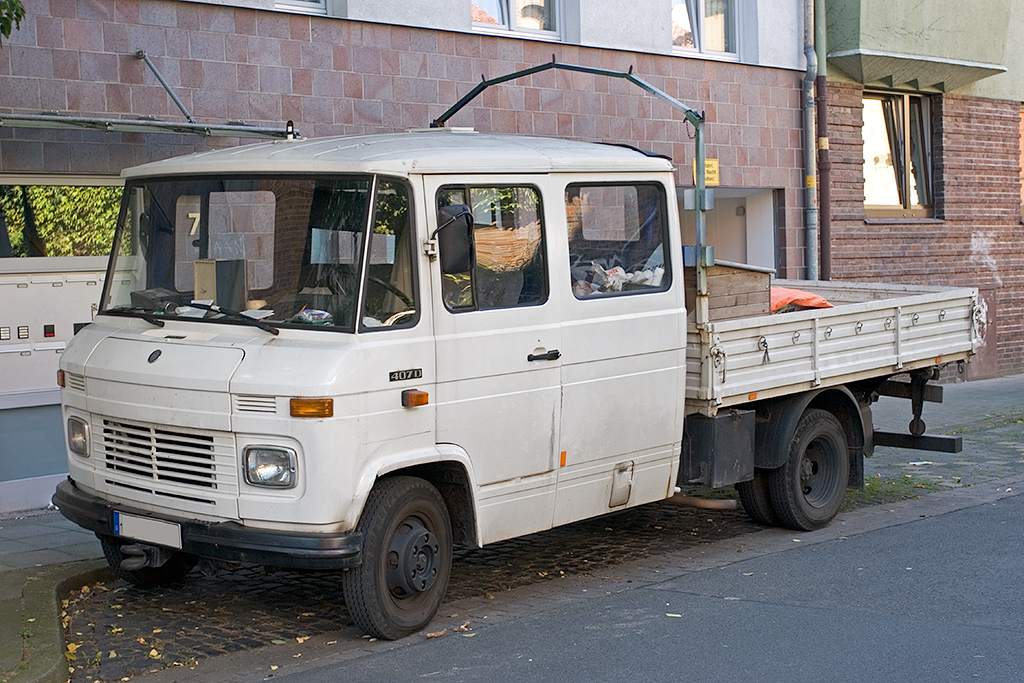
- Mercedes-Benz 407 D double-cab truck (1967–1981)

Overview
- Manufacturer: Daimler-Benz
- Production: 1967–1996
- Assembly: West Germany: Düsseldorf (1967–1991); Germany: Ludwigsfelde (1991–1996); Spain: Alcobendas (1971–1997); Iran: Tehran (IKCo: 1970–1995); Argentina: González Catán (1969–1997); Venezuela: Barcelona (CIF Diasa: 1968–1978); Egypt: 6th of October (1968–1995)

Body and chassis
- Class: Light commercial vehicle
- Body style: Van, Truck, Minibus, Chassis
- Layout: Front engine Rear wheel drive
- Related: Hanomag-Henschel F55; Tata 407 (India); Steyr 590/591/690/691 (Austria)

Dimensions
- Wheelbase: 2950–4100 mm
- Length: 5065–6996 mm
- Width: 2100–2450 mm
- Height: 2385–2750 mm

Chronology
- Predecessor: Mercedes-Benz L 319
- Successor: Mercedes-Benz Vario; Mercedes-Benz MB700/MB800; Mercedes-Benz Accelo

The Mercedes-Benz T2 is a semi-bonneted light commercial vehicle that was manufactured by Daimler-Benz. The T2 is also known as the "Düsseldorf Transporter", since it was built in Düsseldorf from 1967 to 1991. The third generation, built from 1996 at Ludwigsfelde, was branded the Mercedes-Benz Vario.

In Argentina assembly started with the first generation L 608 D in 1969 and ended in 1990. In 1989, the new products are the L 710, L 914 and 814 with the LO variant (chassis bus). The production ceased in 1996. The Venezuelan version of the T2 was manufactured in Barcelona by the Grupo Consorcio 1390 S.A. (currently MMC Automotriz S.A.) as the Mercedes-Benz Class L3. The L3 was built from 1969 up to 1978, when the company was bought by the Ford Motor Company.

== First generation (1967–1986) ==
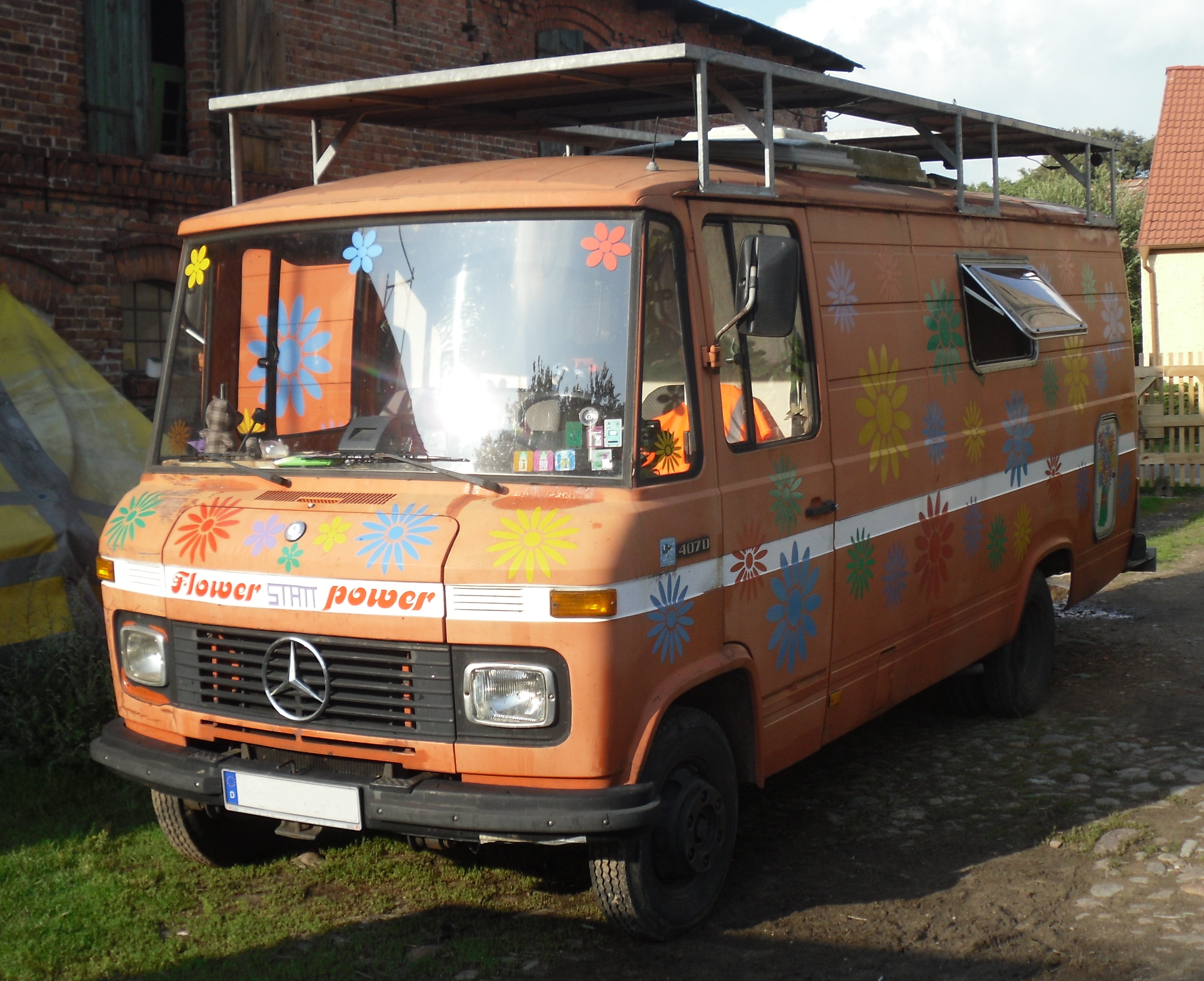
T2 407D pre-facelift

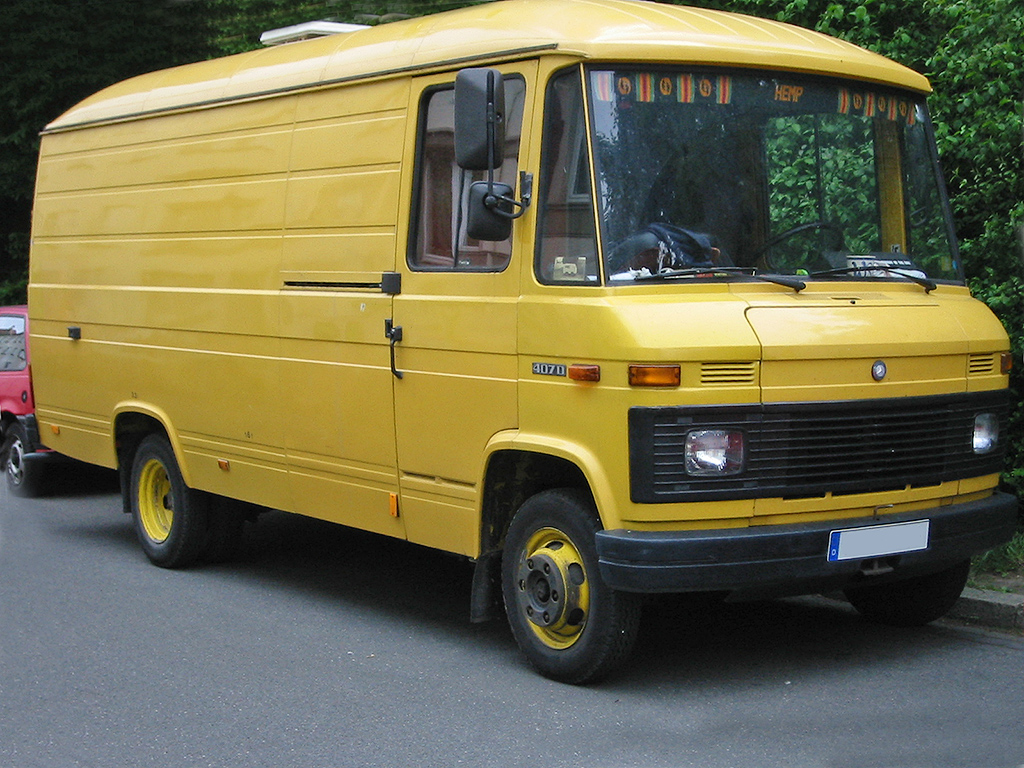
T2 407D post-facelift

In 1967, the T2 was introduced as a successor to the L 319 / L 406 series. Production began with gross weights ranging from 3.5 to 4.6 tons (only slightly heavier than its predecessor), narrow bodies and gasoline and diesel engines derived from the contemporary passenger cars. But soon the line-up was extended by chassis with or without standard or double/crew cabs, longer wheel bases, wider bodies, higher roofs and larger engines. As a result, the first generation T2 ended up with the OM314 engine as the most popular choice and the OM352 as the most powerful engine for the heaviest versions with up to 6.8 tons gross weight. Several CKD assemblies existed (see infobox). In Brazil and some other South American countries it was equipped with a turbo diesel engine.

The T2 was offered as a panelled or glazed van, a more upscale minibus or a light duty truck with single or double cab. Drop-side or dumper beds, standard or insulated box bodies with or without freezer units were supplied ex factory while chassis trucks were available to third-party body builders for individual bodies. The T2s were popular for a wide range of applications such as goods distribution, parcel services (widely used by the Deutsche Post with sliding front doors on both sides), fire brigade and emergency rescue, military, police, landscaping and construction companies.

After the take over of Hanomag-Henschel in 1970/1971 a short lived rebadged Hanomag-Henschel version existed, only differing in the front radiator grille and headlights. In 1981, the T2 received a facelift, the most obvious difference was the new grille made of black plastic. In 1986, after 19 years of production, van and truck bodies were replaced by the second generation T2, buses continued in production for a little extra while. The total number of first generation T2s summed up to 496,447 units.

== Second generation (1986–1996) ==
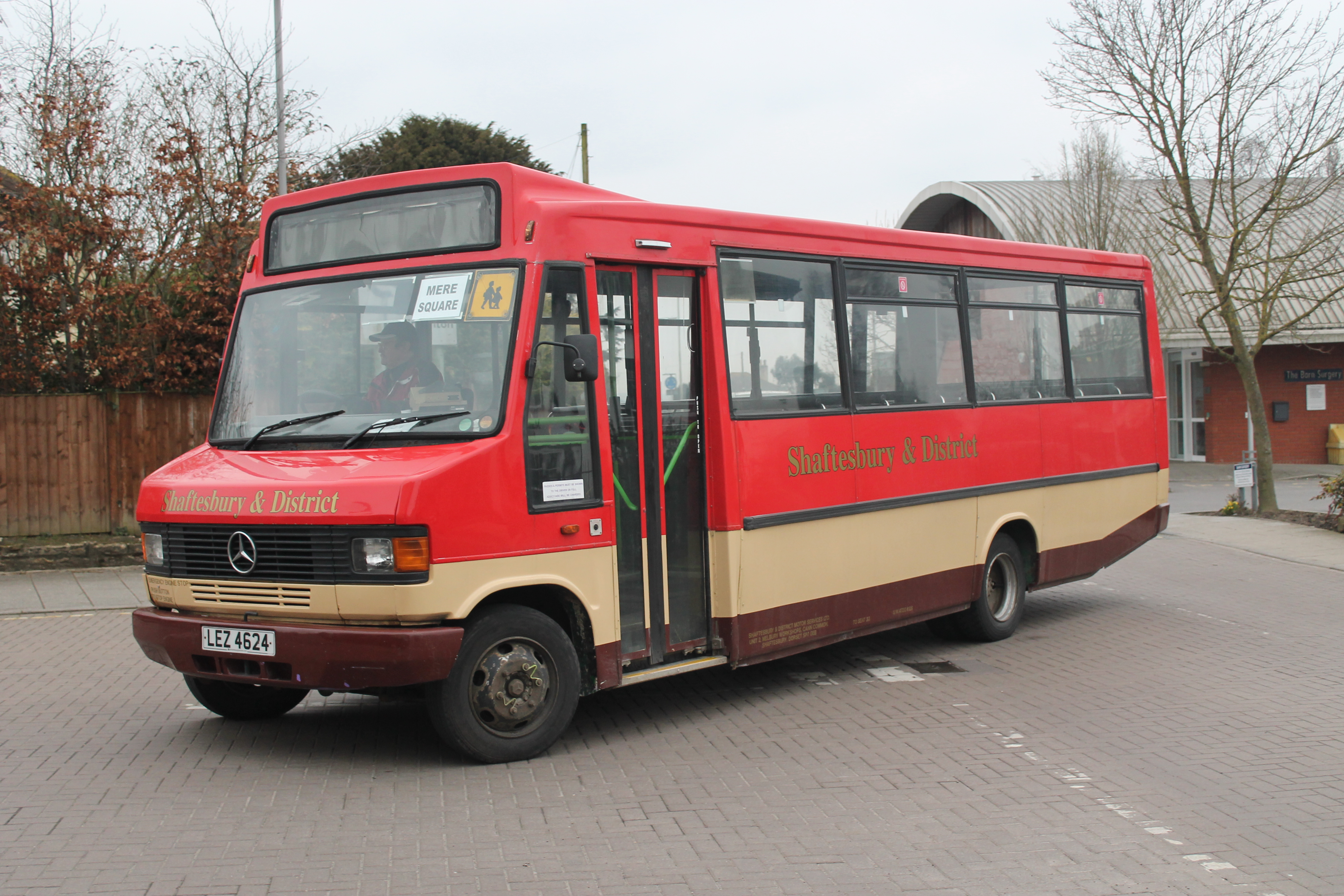
Shaftesbury & District Plaxton Beaver 1 bodied Mercedes-Benz 811D bus in Gillingham, Dorset

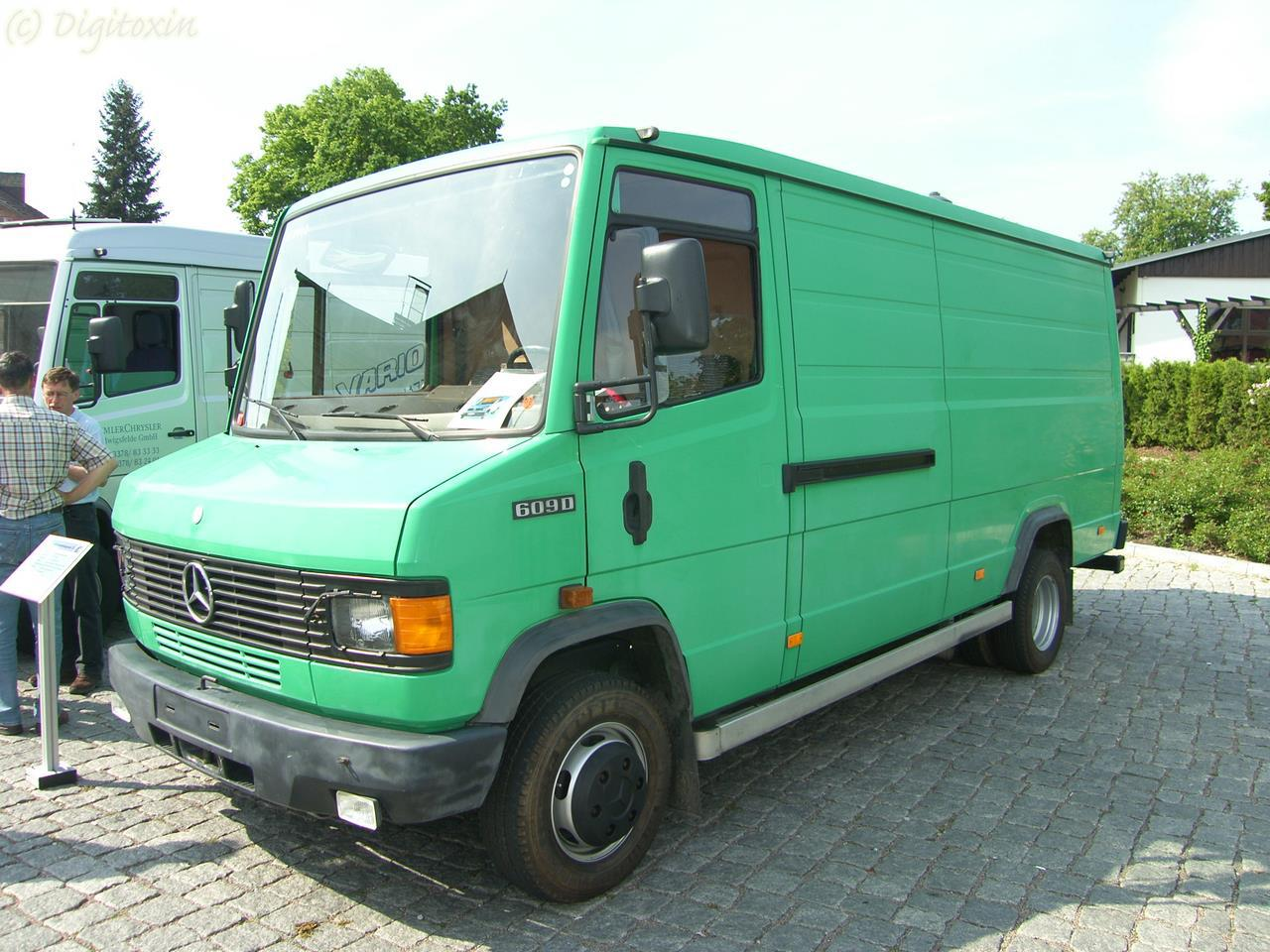
Mercedes-Benz 609D van

The second generation of the T2 was introduced in 1986, and was manufactured until 1996. It was significantly upgraded, the bonnet having become longer and the design altogether more sharp-edged. The chassis sold in large numbers in the United Kingdom and Ireland during the minibus revolution. Variations included the 609D, 614D, 709D, 711D, 811D, 814D and 510 (petrol).

The LO812 was sold in Australia from the early 1990s, Westbus purchasing 26 in 1992 and National Bus Company purchased 45 in 1994/95. Various other operators would purchase smaller fleets.

The T2 was manufactured in Argentina until 1997, as the L 710 and the LO 915 chassis for minibus applications.

== Replacement ==
In 1996, the T2 was replaced by the Mercedes-Benz Vario. Visual differences between the Vario and its predecessors were quite small, but included new headlights and radiator grille: at the same time the interior, engine and suspension were revised.

== Notes ==
=== Bibliography ===
- Röcke, Matthias (2008). Mercedes-Benz Transporter: Postwar to Present Day. Königswinter, Germany: Heel Verlag. ISBN 9783868520682.
