= Kuladhar =

Kuladhar is a given name of Indian origin. Notable people with the name include:

- Kuladhar Chaliha (1887–1963), Indian politician
- Kuladhar Saikia (born 1959), Indian police officer
