= Hanomag F-series =

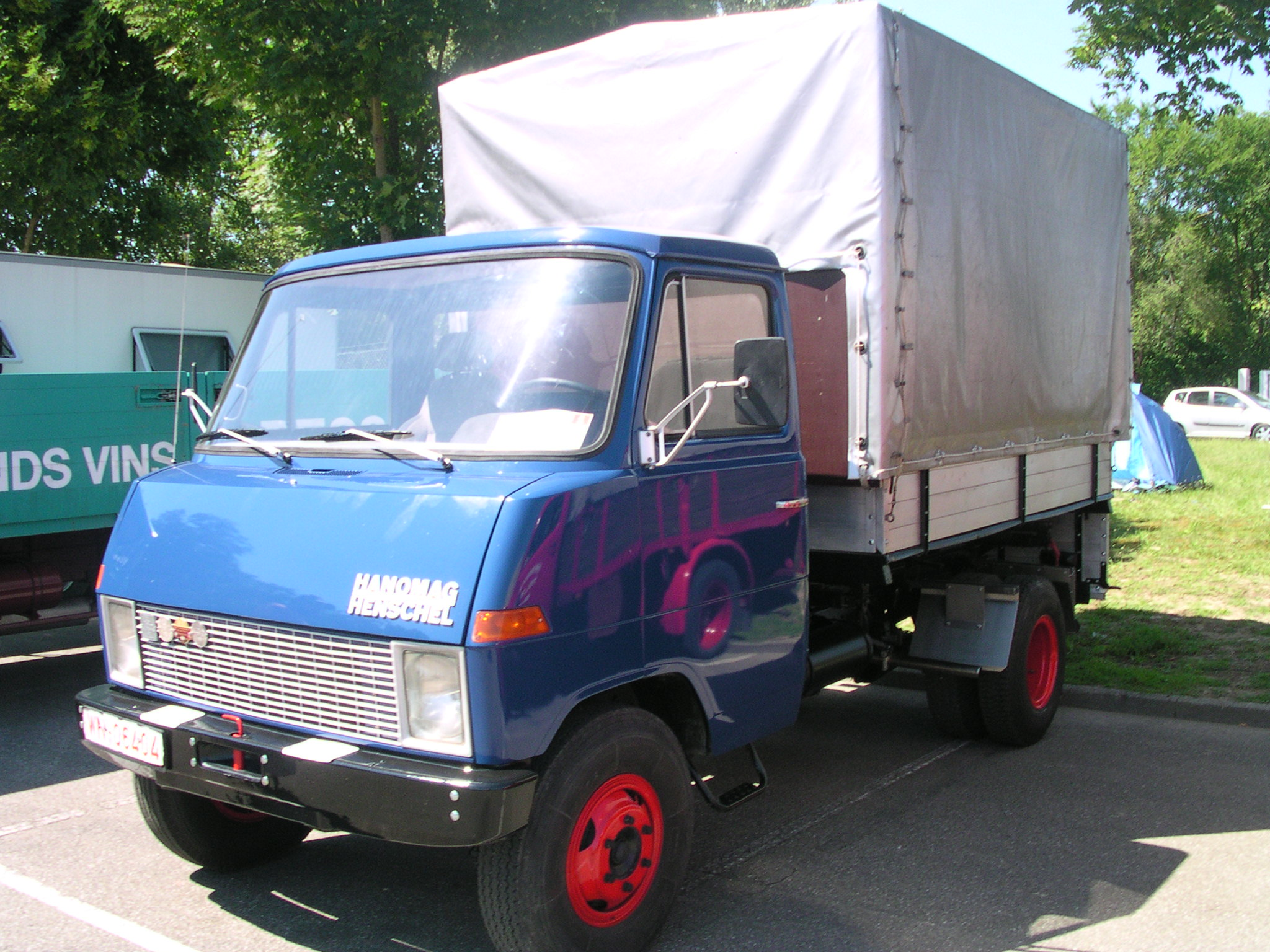
- Hanomag-Henschel F55

Overview
- Manufacturer: Hanomag; Hanomag-Henschel
- Production: 1967–1973
- Assembly: Sebaldsbrück, Bremen, Germany
- Designer: Louis L. Lepoix

Body and chassis
- Body style: Conventional
- Related: Steyr 590/591/690/691

Dimensions
- Wheelbase: 3,050–4,750 mm (120–187 in)

Chronology
- Predecessor: Hanomag Markant

The Hanomag F-series is a series of medium-duty trucks built by Hanomag, then Hanomag-Henschel after a 1969 merger with the Henschel company, in their Bremen Seebaldsbrück plant from 1967 until 1973. It was replaced in favor of the more conservative Mercedes-Benz T2 after that company took over Hanomag-Henschel. The F-series badge was also used on the smaller "Harburger Transporter" as well as on some rebadged Mercedes-Benz T2 models.

== Model History ==
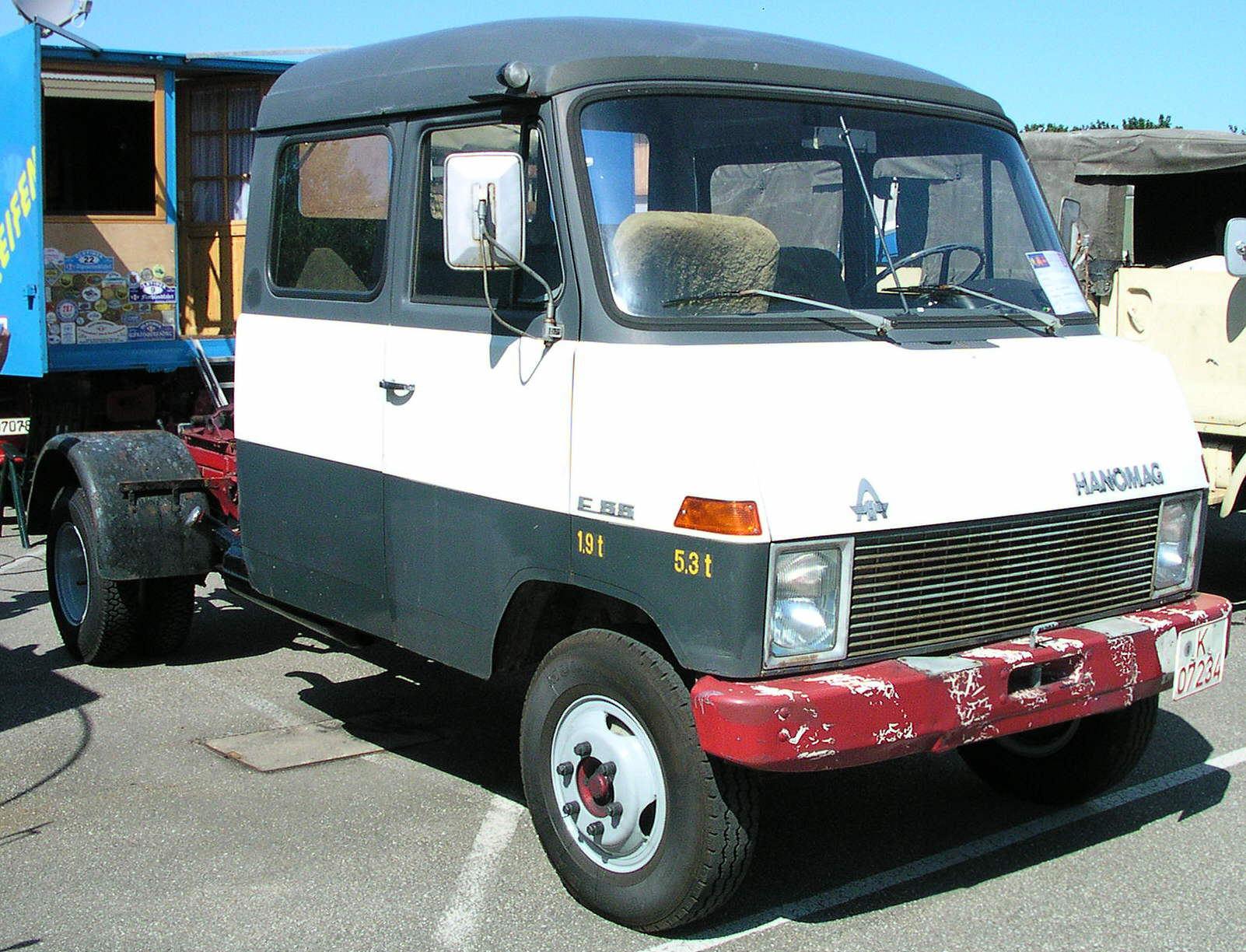
Hanomag F55 double-cab

Rheinstahl-Hanomag AG developed an entirely new range to replace the heavier models in the Hanomag Kurier/Garant/Markant range, and to fill the gap between the old Tempo products and the heavier Hanomag trucks. It was a simple ladder frame design. The designer, Frenchman Louis Lucien Lepoix, was also responsible for a number of designs for Magirus-Deutz and Büssing. The F-series was available in several weight capacities ranging from the 4.5-tonne (9,900 lb) F45 to the 7.5-tonne (16,500 lb) F76. The numbers ending in a "5" received the lesser engine option (usually the four-cylinder engines); those ending in a "6" the larger engine – usually with six cylinders.

The engines were all inline diesels from the all-new D-100 range which was simultaneously introduced in Hanomag's tractor lineup. The F66 and F76's D 161 L is a 4,253 cc (259.5 cu in) straight-six unit, producing 100 PS (74 kW) at 3400 rpm. The smallest F45 has a 2.8 L (2,835 cc), 65 PS (48 kW) four-cylinder engine called D 141 L. In addition to trucks, the F76 was also available as a tractor unit. In 1969 the air-sprung F76 LL was introduced, and the name was changed to Hanomag-Henschel subsequent to the amalgamation of the two branches. There was also a heavier yet F80-series introduced later, offering a 8.5-tonne (18,700 lb) payload. The F85 has the same 100 PS engine as does the F66/F76, while the F86 received the 4.7 L (4,713 cc), 115 PS (85 kW) D 162 L six-cylinder diesel.

Rheinstahl, the owners of both Hanomag and Henschel, merged the companies in 1969 and sold a controlling interest in the resulting Hanomag-Henschel company to Mercedes-Benz. Rheinstahl suffered further financial setbacks and sold the remainder of the company to Mercedes-Benz at the end of 1970. Mercedes-Benz kept building certain parts of the Hanomag-Henschel lineup, in areas where Mercedes-Benz themselves were weak, but the F-series was thus discontinued in 1973, after only six years on the market. The Bremen factory had begun producing the smaller "Harburger Transporter" (F20-F35) alongside the F-series trucks in 1969 and continued to do so after the larger trucks were discontinued. The plant went on to build Mercedes-Benz' "Bremer Transporter".

== Other F-series vehicles ==
While the original F-series was only offered as a truck, panel van and minibus versions of the Mercedes-Benz T2 (built in Düsseldorf) were also sold with Hanomag-Henschel F-series badging, beginning in 1970. These used the headlights from the F and a Hanomag-Henschel grille. This badge-engineered version continued to be available into the latter half of the 1970s. The smaller "Harburger Transporter", thus called because it was built in Harburg, Hamburg, was also sold with Hanomag (and Hanomag-Henschel) F-series badging, F20, F25, or F35 depending on the weight rating. Based on an older design by Tempo, it was built as a Hanomag-Henschel until 1975 and as a Mercedes-Benz until 1977.

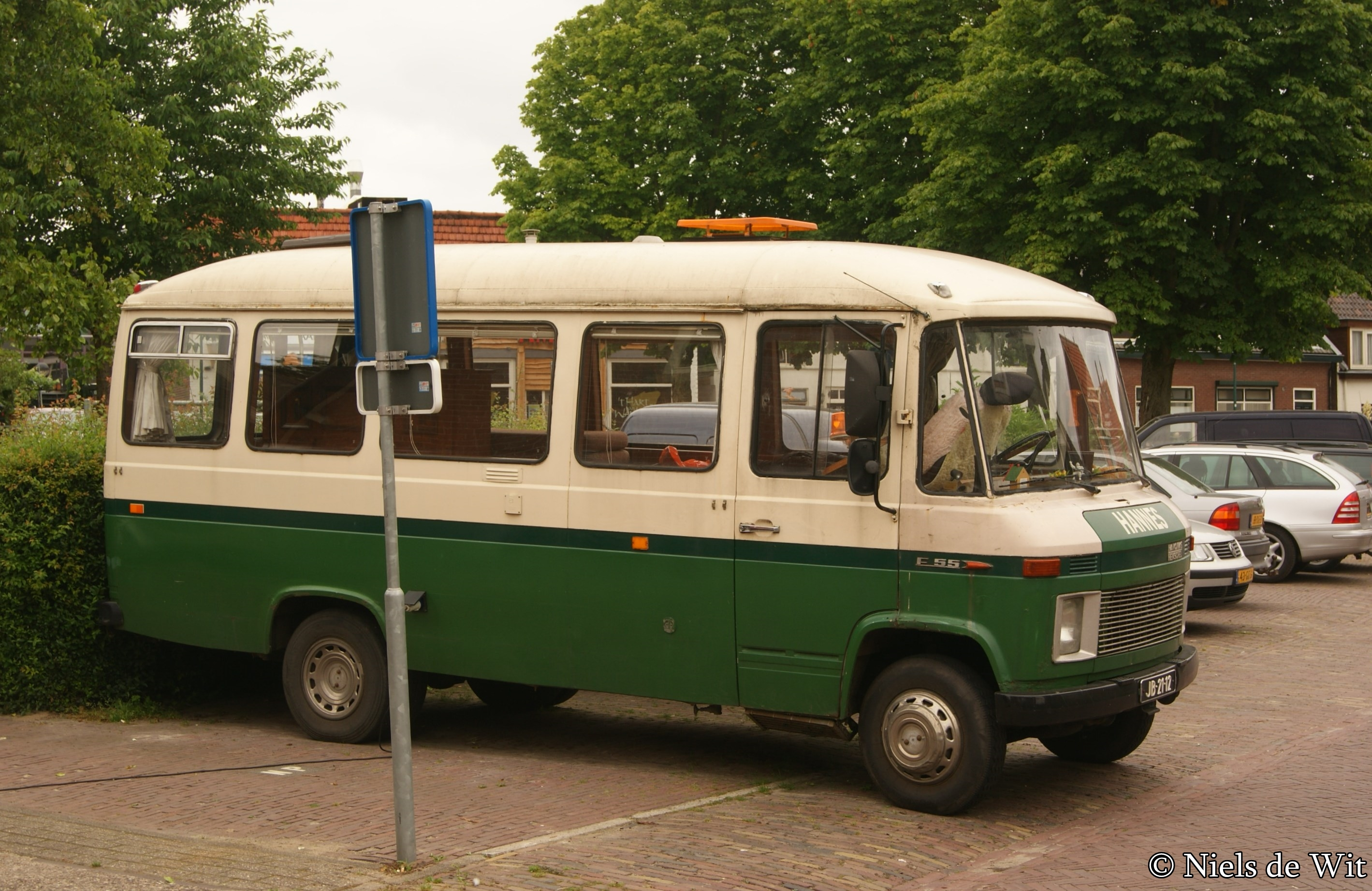
1974 Hanomag-Henschel F55 KA (Netherlands)

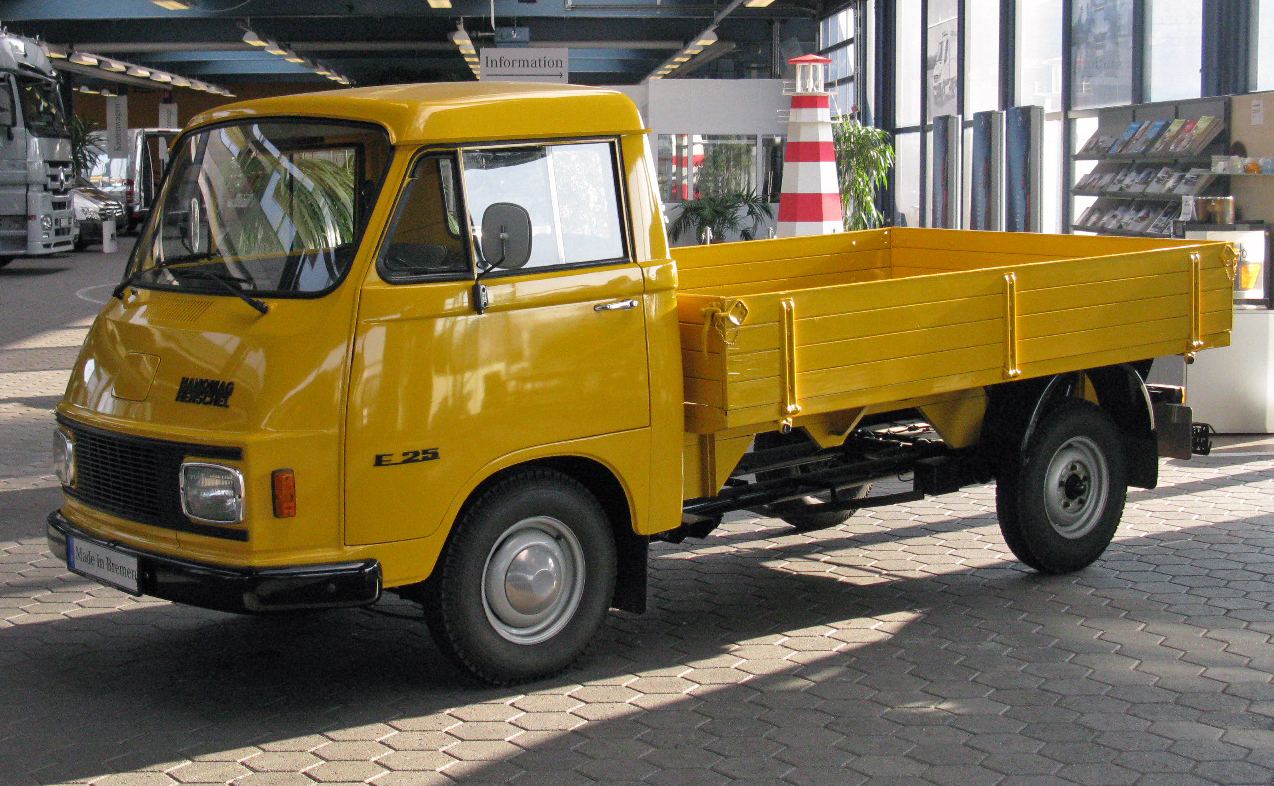
The smaller Hanomag-Henschel F25

== Steyr ==
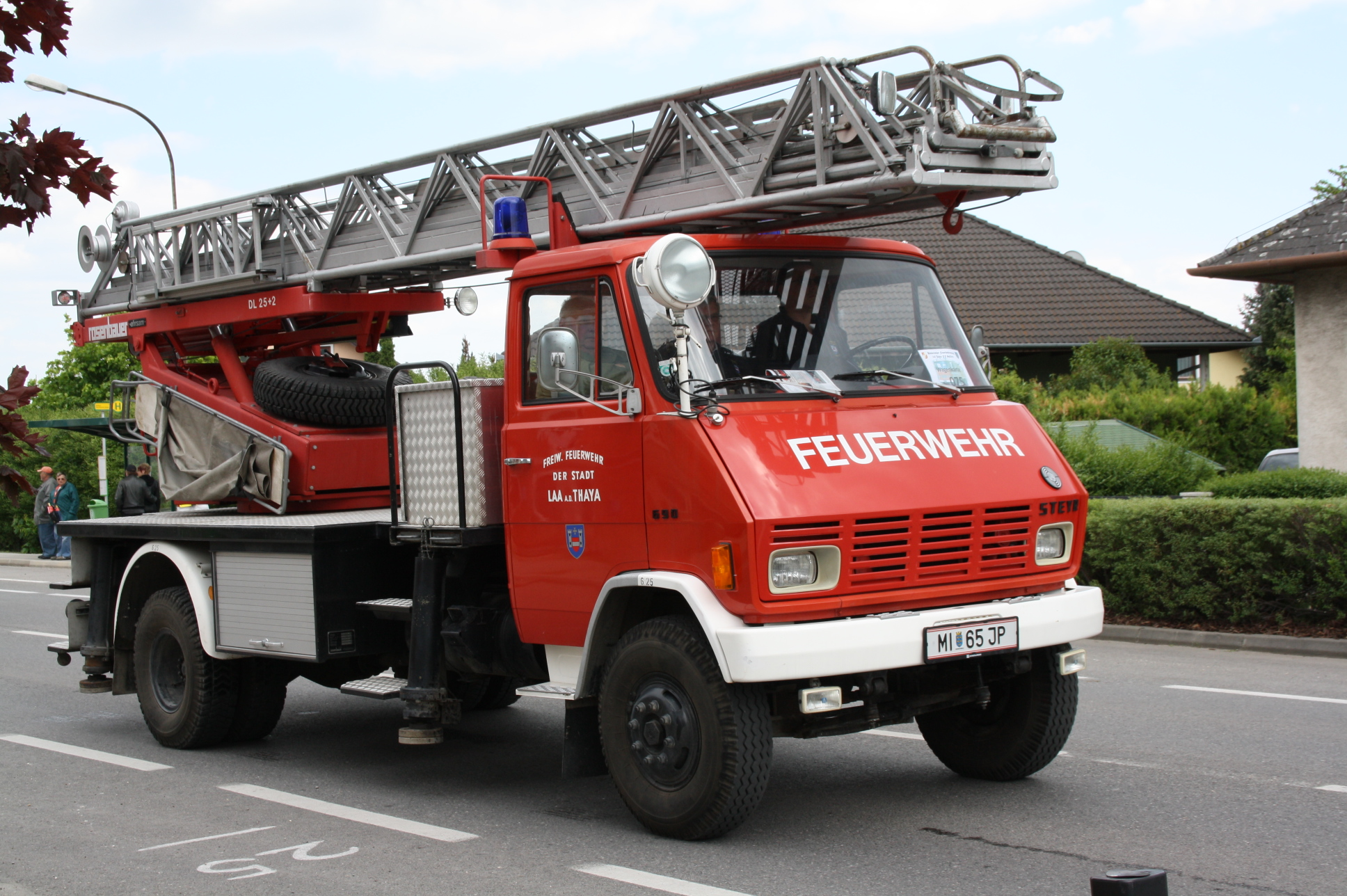
Steyr 690 fire engine (Austria)

The cabin was also used by Steyr of Austria for their 590 and 690 series of trucks, introduced in 1969. They did use Steyr's chassis and engines, however. While the bodies were originally sent to Austria to be installed on Steyr's chassis, the pressing tools were sent there after manufacture came to an end in Bremen. Steyr developed a thoroughly modernized model in 1982, called the 591/691. This had a short life, as the licensing and all of the manufacturing tools were transferred to India's Tata Motors in the mid-eighties. The resulting Tata 407/709 was built from 1986 until 2014.
