= Mercedes-Benz L 319 =

Mercedes-Benz L319
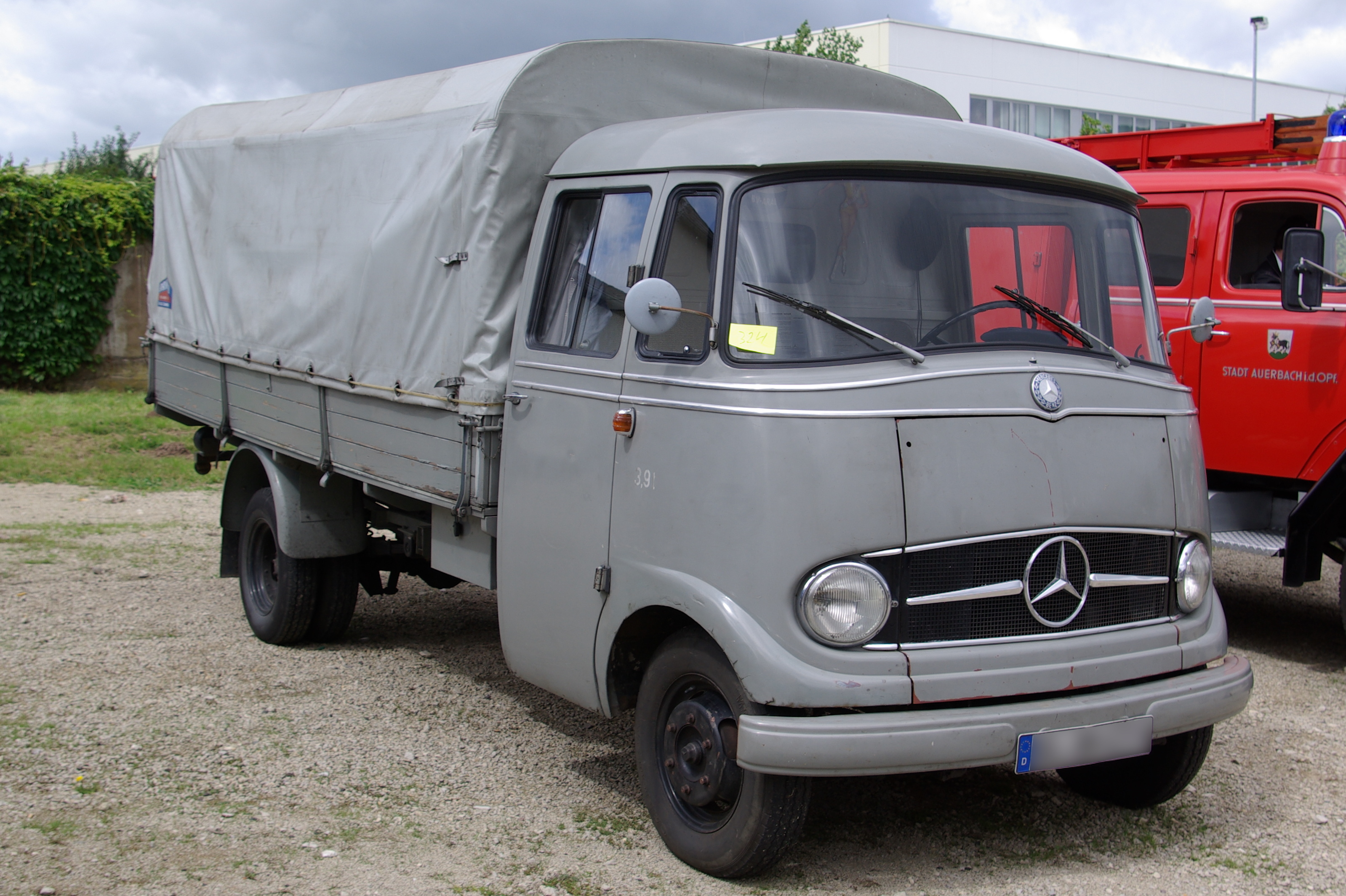
- Mercedes-Benz L 319 platform with tarpaulin

Overview
- Manufacturer: Daimler-Benz AG
- Production: 1955–1968
- Assembly: West Germany: Sindelfingen (load carriers, until 1961); West Germany: Mannheim (minibuses, until 1961); West Germany: Düsseldorf (after 1961); Iran: Tehran (Iran National, 1967–1968); Egypt: 6th October (1961–1969)

Body and chassis
- Class: Light commercial vehicle
- Body style: Cargo Van; Crew Van; Pickup (stand. and crew cab); Cab Chassis; Minibus
- Layout: Front engine, rear-wheel drive

Chronology
- Successor: Mercedes-Benz T2

The Mercedes-Benz L 319 is a light commercial vehicle built by Mercedes-Benz between 1955 and 1968. Larger than a standard delivery van, but smaller than a conventional light truck of the period, it was the manufacturer's first model in this class. The vehicle was offered with a range of van and truck bodies. Special application and minibus (O 319) variants were also available.

== Background ==
By 1955, Daimler-Benz was well represented in the passenger car market, and also offered commercial operators an extensive range of conventional trucks. The smallest of the trucks, offered in its then current form since 1945, was the Mercedes-Benz L 3500 range. As regards smaller commercial vehicles, during the war, Mercedes was compelled by government imposed rationalisation to manufacture the Opel Blitz truck of its leading competitor, but the company had featured no commercial vehicle of its own below the 3 tonne level since before the war. However, during the early 1950s the success of the Volkswagen panel van and rejuvenated Opel Blitz persuaded Mercedes-Benz that the category was too important to be ignored.

== Launch ==
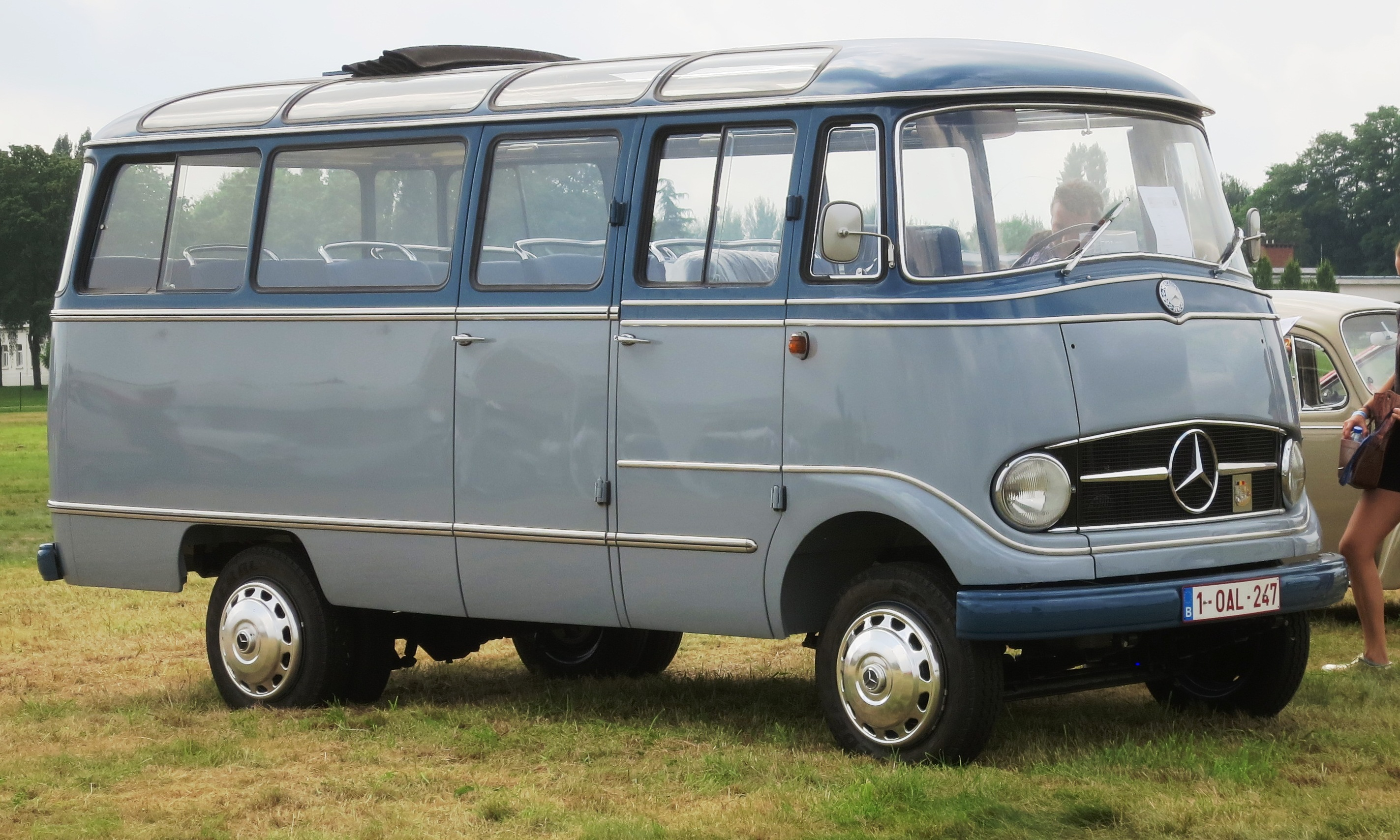
Mercedes-Benz O 319 Minibus with panoramic windows and hubcaps

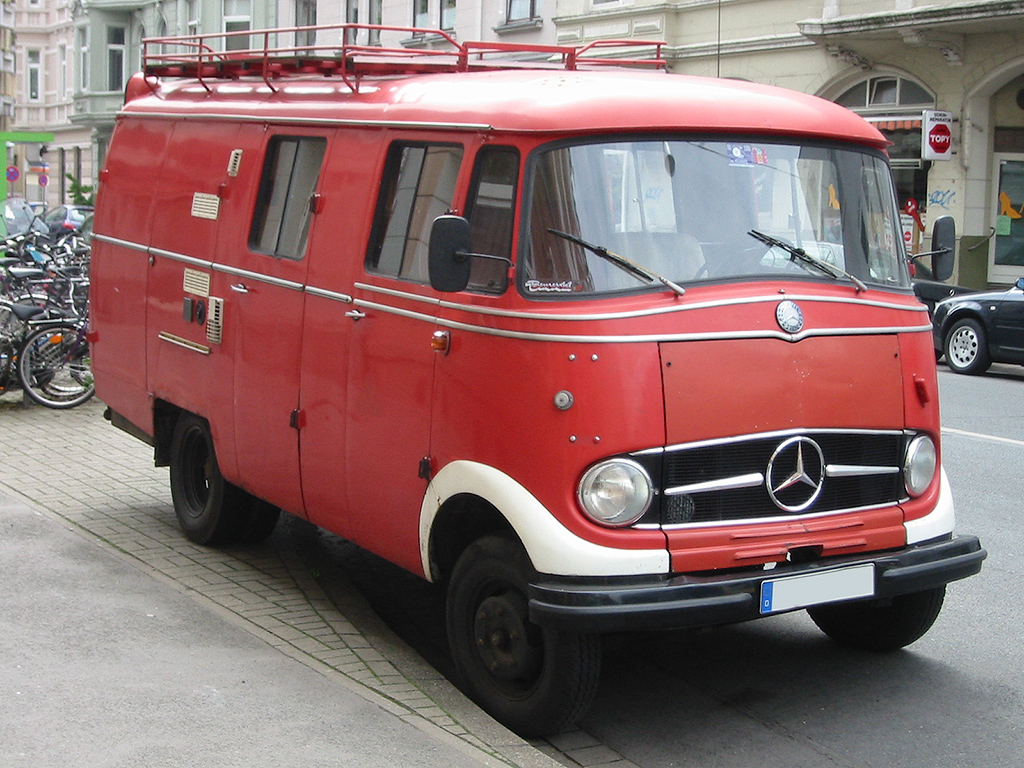
Mercedes-Benz L 319 Fire truck LF 8

The van that premiered at the Frankfurt Motor Show in September 1955 had a gross weight of 3.6 tonnes and a maximum load capacity of 1.6 or 1.8 tonnes according to version. A wide range of body permutations included a panel van, a standard level light truck, a low level light flat-bed truck and various increasingly diverse and elaborate types of minibus. Fire truck variants are particularly well represented among the surviving L319 to be seen in motor museums.

== Vehicle architecture ==
Mercedes did not follow the Volkswagen rear-engined configuration, but the van nevertheless featured a modern "cab over cabin", without the sort of protruding front bonnet/hood characteristic of the Opel Blitz and larger Mercedes commercial vehicles of the time. Placing the driver at the front of the vehicle ensured a good view out and gave the vehicle a contemporary look as well as maximising load space. But the retention of the forward mounted engine left the driver sharing his cabin with the engine which occupied the floor space between the driver and his passenger, and the body designers also had to take account of a drive-shaft which connected to the rear wheels. The vehicle has a turning radius of 11.5 Meters

== Running gear ==
Leaf springing and rigid axles had the merit of simplicity and development costs were also kept down by using engines directly from the company's passenger car range. The original L319s shared the 43 hp engine of the Mercedes-Benz 180D. Subsequently, slightly more powerful diesel alternatives were offered along with petrol engined variants.

== Assembly ==
Initially the vans were assembled at the company's Sindelfingen plant, not far from the Mercedes head office at Untertürkheim. However, in 1958 the company acquired Auto Union in a package of assets that included the Düsseldorf plant where that company had built cars following the loss of its original Zwickau plant to the Soviet occupation zone of Germany in 1945. Mercedes progressively transferred Auto Union car production to a new plant at Ingolstadt and the Düsseldorf facility became (and remains) a plant for Mercedes-Benz commercial vehicle production. Production of the L319 transferred to Düsseldorf in 1961.

The van was also assembled at Vitoria in Spain and in Port Melbourne Australia from CKD kits.

And the minibus version was assembled in Iran by Iran National Company.

== Name changes ==
In 1963 the L 319 designation was abandoned. The vehicles were now branded as the L 405 (diesel powered) and L 407 (petrol / gasoline powered). There was also an L 406 and L 408. This was part of a wider relabelling of the company's commercial vehicle range intended, for the initiated, to identify "weight and output data" in model names.

== Replacement ==
For the 1968 model year the L319 was replaced by the Mercedes-Benz T2. By this time between 120,000 and 140,000 had been produced.

== See also ==
- List of buses
