= Yugadrashta =

Yugadrashta: The Visionary
- Directed by: Bhaskar Jyoti Mahanta
- Written by: Bhaskar Jyoti Mahanta
- Story by: Bhaskar Jyoti Mahanta
- Based on: Pitambar Deva Goswami
- Produced by: Swapnali Mahanta
- Starring: Moon Borkotoky; Haridev Goswami; Guna Mahanta
- Cinematography: Suman Duwarah
- Music by: Anurag Saikia
- Release date: 26 October 2012
- Country: India
- Language: Assamese

Yugadrashta: The Visionary is an Assamese language short film based on the life of reformer and freedom fighter Pitambar Deva Goswami starring Moon Borkotoky, directed by DGP of Assam Police Bhaskar Jyoti Mahanta and produced by Swapnali Mahanta.

== Plot ==
The film begins with the return by boat of Goswami and his secretary-biographer, Gangadhar Hazarika, to his home in Majuli from EID Majlis in 1956. He was the only Satra leader to attend. They discuss the 1914 ordination ceremony of Pitambardev as Sattradhikar of the Garmur Satra, the monastery of a celibate order in Majuli. The ceremony and the heritage of the Satra tradition appear in flashback. They agree that society's rules are not ordained by God, and a person's worth should be judged by their sense of justice.

Goswami, who reformed his order's celibacy, is portrayed as a man fighting with himself. His most active period was during the 1920s, when he introduced several reforms and opposed the British colonial tax structure. Goswami's disagreement with H. W. Phriel, deputy commissioner of Sivasagar District, at a meeting where he appealed to the public not to pay taxes ended with the commissioner laying his gun at Goswami's feet as a gesture of respect. His attention to the Mishing people and Keot/Kaibarta is interspersed with his intolerance of racial discrimination. Although Goswami heads a conservative institution, he is undeterred by social castigation as a result of his views on the emancipation of women through education and widow remarriage. His activity in the Quit India Movement drives Harold Dennehy, Chief Secretary of Assam in 1943, ordering his arrest and detention outside the state.

The film flashes back to Goswami opening schools in the Mikir Hills of Karbi Anglong district, despite failing health, and his introduction of women's theatre and dance. It ends at daybreak, when Goswami spells out his dream of an Assam in which the Bodo, the Mishing, the Keot/Kaibarta, and the Muslims live in harmony.

== Cast ==
- Pitambar Deva Goswami - Moon Borkotoky
- Goswami as a child – Aashwas Rag Mahanta
- Sattradhikar, Auniati Sattra – Haridev Goswami
- Gongadhar - Guna Mahanta
- Aldhara - Pradip Bhuyan
- H. W. Phriel - Henry Cottee Jones (Eden)
- Chief Secretary - Rupert Grey
- Niru - Srijani Bhaswa Mahanta
- Ramai - Rubi Mahanta
- Mising Lady - Jyotsna Doley
- Niru's friend - Priyanka Baruah

== Awards ==
- 61st National Film Awards: Anurag Saikia (best music director, non-feature film)
- 2nd Mumbai Shorts International Film Festival-13: Best Music Award, music director (Amrit Pritam, Anurag Saikia)
- 2nd Delhi Shorts International Film Festival-13: Special Festival Mention (Direction), Bhaskar Jyoti Mahanta
- Noida International Film Festival 14: Special Honour, Best Actor (jury), Best Director (jury)
