= Arif Md Yeasin Jwadder =

Indian human rights lawyer and activist

Arif Md Yeasin Jwadder, commonly known as Arif Jwadder, is an Indian human rights lawyer and activist from the state of Assam. He is noted for his legal advocacy on issues of police accountability and civil liberties.

In December 2021, Jwadder filed a Public Interest Litigation (PIL) before the Gauhati High Court, seeking an independent investigation into alleged "fake encounters" by the Assam Police. Between May 2021 and August 2022, 171 police encounter cases were reported in the state, resulting in 56 deaths, according to government data. Although the High Court dismissed the PIL, Jwadder appealed to the Supreme Court of India, which overturned the ruling and directed the Assam Human Rights Commission to conduct an independent and time-bound investigation.

Jwadder has also filed PILs on other constitutional matters, including one challenging the mandatory registration of job seekers at government employment exchanges.

In addition to his legal work, he is an observer of regional security and humanitarian issues, including the impact of Myanmar’s 2021 military coup on synthetic drug production and trafficking networks in the region.
