= State Disaster Response Force (Assam) =

Indian specialized force

State Disaster Response Force Assam

Agency overview
- Formed: 2011; 14 years ago
- Jurisdiction: Assam, India
- Parent department: Assam Police

State Disaster Response Force (SDRF) Assam is the search and rescue division of the Assam Police department in north-eastern India.

== History ==
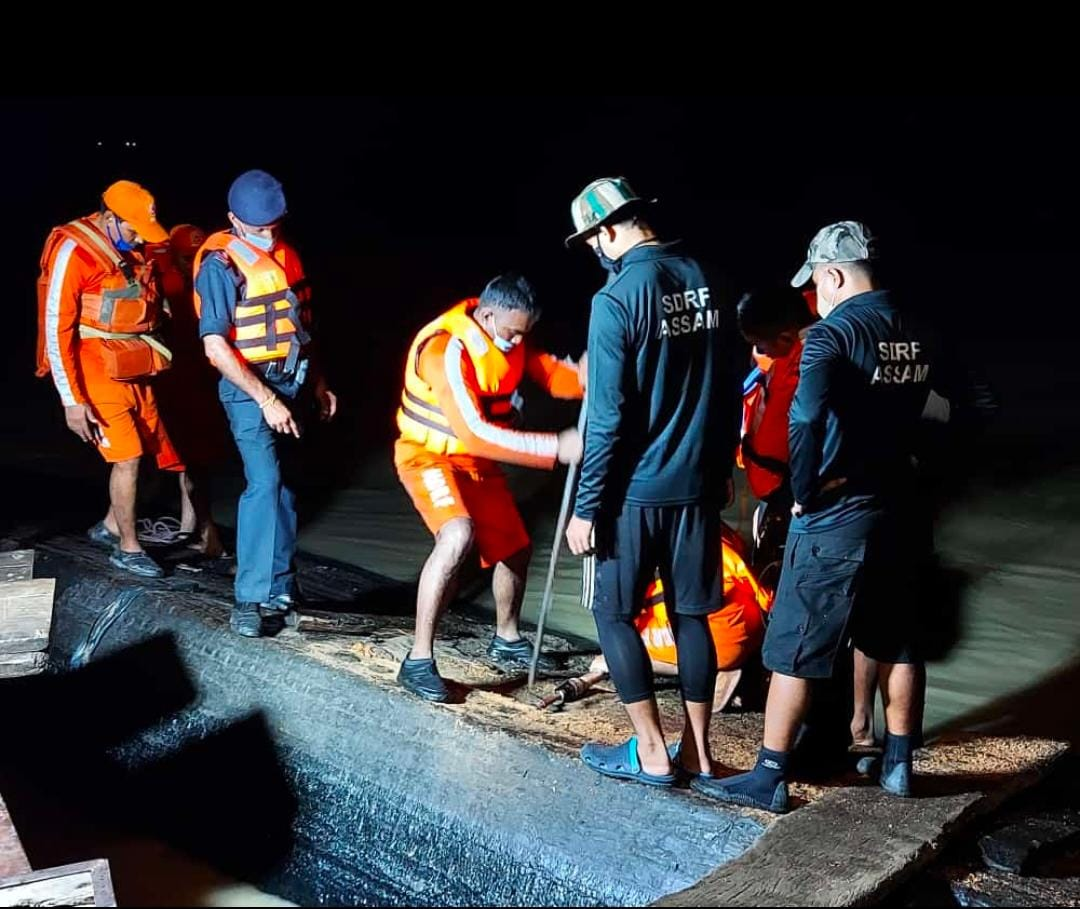
SDRF Assam personnel during search and rescue at a 2021 incident near Nimati ghat.

The National Policy on Disaster Management 2009 requires the state governments in India to raise their own forces for rapid disaster response. As a result, the Assam State Government made the decision to raise the SDRF in September 2010, in line with the National Disaster Response Force. This was enacted on 15 December 2011. The SDRF had a total strength of 3 companies with 337 active members, which is approximately 10 personnel per district.

In 2013, the SDRF was attached to the Assam Fire and Emergency Services, a branch of the Assam police department.

As of 2021, the SDRF had five companies: Lakhimpur, Cachar, Guwahati, Abhayapuri, and Dergaon.

== See also ==
- Odisha Disaster Rapid Action Force
- State Disaster Response Force Uttarakhand
