= Border outpost =

Outpost maintained by a sovereign state on its border

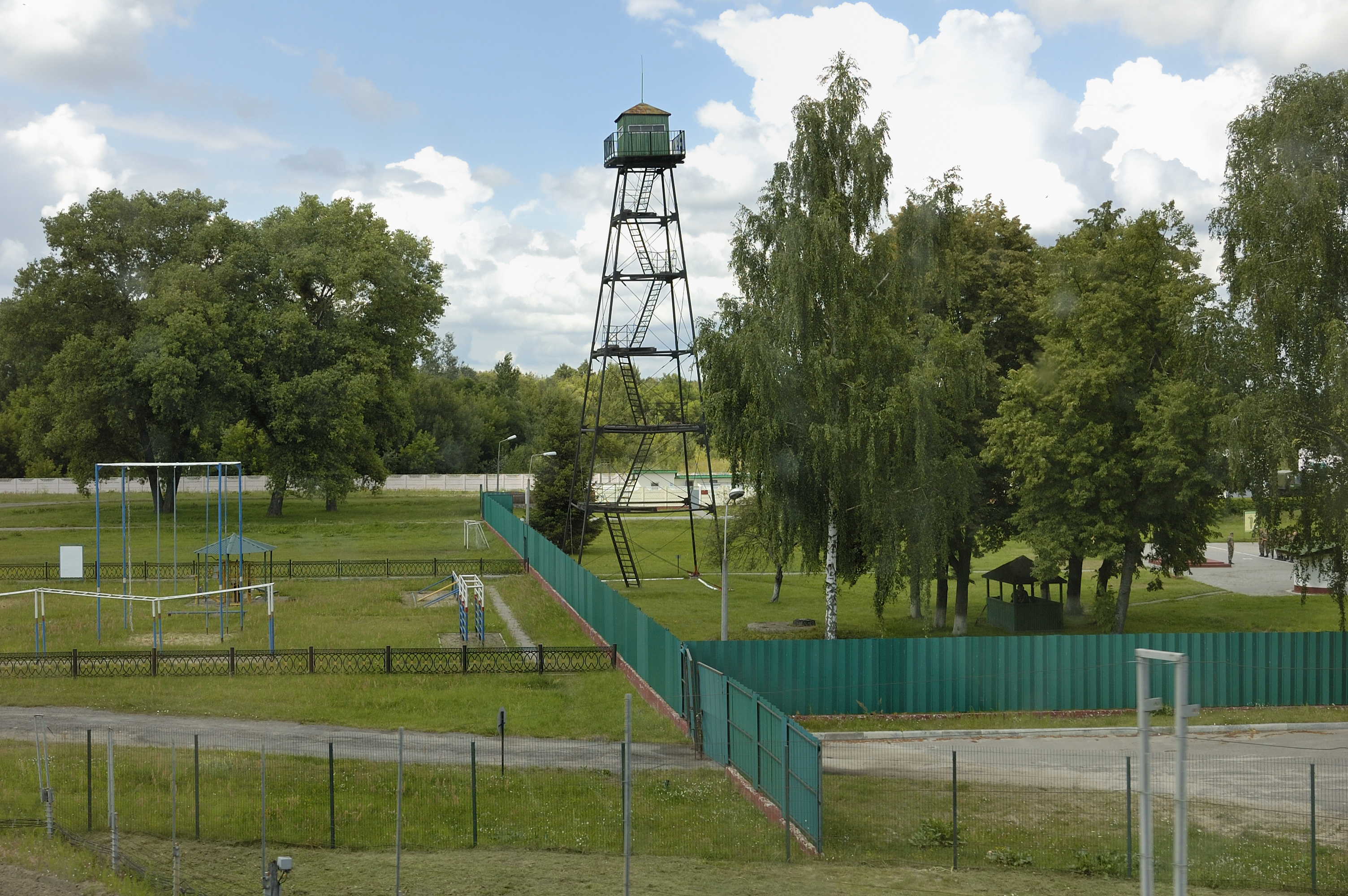
Border outpost in Brest, Belarus

A border outpost, border out post, border observation post or BOP is an outpost maintained by a sovereign state on its border, usually one of a series placed at regular intervals, to watch over and safeguard its border with a neighboring state with which it may or may not have friendly relations. Such posts are staffed by border guards and are at all times connected by radio communication with ongoing border patrols in their region and the force headquarters in the interior of the country for their day-to-day functioning, passing on intelligence and for requesting supplies and any needed reinforcements in emergencies.

Depending on the length and breadth of a country's borders and geography, they could be located in a wide variety of terrain, including the inhospitable areas that often mark political boundaries.

== Layout ==
Border outposts, where available, are built on strategic locations which are usually elevated at the highest points in the local terrain and where possible on hilltops along the border.

Depending upon international relations with the neighboring country and local strategic needs, BOPs are sometimes built with an assortment of a few administration and residential buildings or tents, an armory, trench, bunkers, wire obstacles, fortified machine gun posts and watchtowers.

A flagpole flying the country's national flag may be located on the premise along with a Wireless Communication Antenna and a designated clearing as a make-do helipad.

== Peacetime function ==
Border outposts are staffed in peacetime by the border guard to check smuggling, infiltration by spies of untrusted neighboring countries, insurgents bent on smuggling weapons and explosives for terrorist attacks and subversive activities, illegal immigration and human trafficking etc.. They usually have watchtowers where soldiers are posted day and night on sentry duty looking for intruders and illegal cross-border activity of any kind. Patrols go out regularly to patrol the international border to check illegal crossings and track any footprints of those who may have crossed over illegally or attempted to. In case intrusion by foreign elements is confirmed, it is the responsibility of the Border guard based on the BOP to trace the intruders by checking the nearby settlements, villages and towns and inform the law enforcement agencies, Customs and Police authorities.

== Wartime function ==
During wartime however the border guard, the special forces tasked with patrolling the border in peacetime, withdraw from the Border outposts and provide assistance in a limited capacity to the country's regular army which then comes and mans all the border outposts at the international border facing the enemy neighboring country. Wartime assistance of the border guard to the army is essential as they are familiar with the local terrain having patrolled it on a daily basis during peacetime. During wars these BOPs are reworked into well fortified dug-in positions from where regular army units can operate to defend the territorial integrity of the country.

== See also ==
- Border checkpoint
- Blockhouse
- Outpost (military)
- Observation post
- Border guard

Non-military:

- Human outpost (artificially created controlled human habitat)
