= Assamese Wikipedia =

Assamese-language edition of Wikipedia

- Assamese Wikipedia logo
- Website type: Internet encyclopedia project
- Available in: Assamese
- Owner: Wikimedia Foundation
- Creator: Assamese Wiki community
- Editor: Assamese Wiki community
- Website: as.wikipedia.org
- Commercial: No
- Registration: Optional
- Users: 9,957 (1 December 2014)
- Launched: 2 June 2002; 24 years ago
- Current status: Active
- Content license: Creative Commons Attribution/ Share-Alike 4.0 (most text also dual-licensed under GFDL); Media licensing varies

The Assamese Wikipedia (Assamese: অসমীয়া ৱিকিপিডিয়া, romanized: Axomiya Wikipidia) is the Assamese language edition of Wikipedia, the free encyclopedia. Its domain came into existence on 2 June 2002. In July 2015, it had reached 3,600 articles.

It now has 25,517 articles with 51,101 registered users.

The first Assamese Wikipedia workshop was organized in Guwahati University on 29 January 2012, and later another on 1 February 2012, at the Tezpur University in Tezpur to inform people how to edit and add to the wiki. Later on, many other workshops have been organized by community members in different places in Assam.
