= Pitambar Deva Goswami =

Hindu spiritual leader (1885–1962)

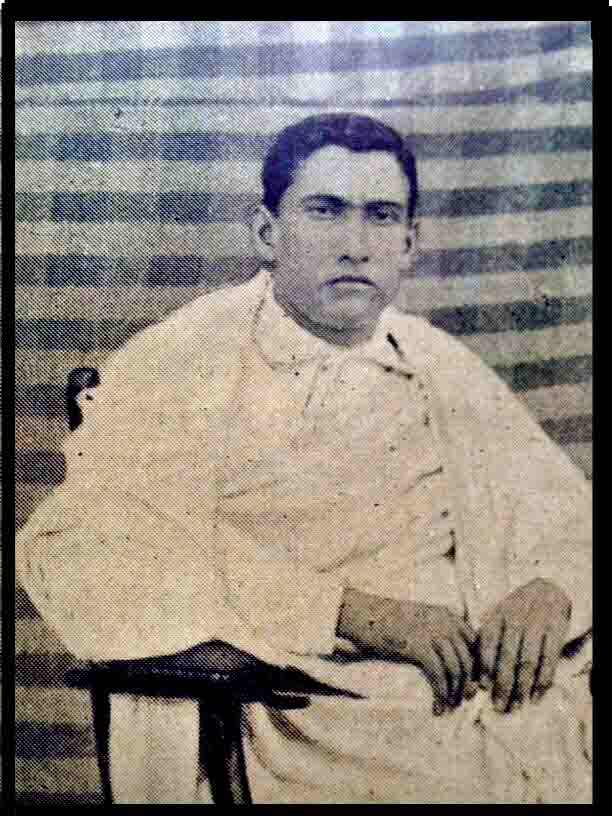

Personal life
- Born: 10 June 1885 Sri Sri Garamur Satra, Majuli
- Died: 20 October 1962 (aged 77)
- Occupation: Ekasarana Preceptor
- Honors: Satradhikar (chief) of Vaishnavite monastery Garamur Satra of Majuli

Religious life
- Religion: Hinduism
- Philosophy: Humanity

Pitambar Deva Goswami (10 June 1885 – 20 October 1962) was a spiritual leader and social reformer in the Indian state of Assam. At age six, he was accepted into the monastic order of the Garamur Satra. Goswami was schooled in Sanskrit by Nityanandadeva Bhagawati Vidyavagish in the satra. When he was 21, he was appointed Satradhikar (head priest) of the Garamur Satra after the death of Jogachandra Deva Satradhikar Goswami..

In addition to studying Sanskrit grammar, literature, philosophy, religion and theology, Goswami taught himself English and modern Assamese literature. He learned Ayurveda, took lessons in vocal and instrumental classical music (sitar, violin and harmonium) and invited experts from Calcutta to the satra.

== Work ==
Goswami pursued reforms which influenced the social life of Assam. He introduced martial arts and acrobatics for physical training, discipline and self-defense, and improved agriculture with the introduction of tractors. Goswami reformed taxation, laws and duties, advocating self-reliance through agriculture. He opened Kirtanghar to the public, provided famine assistance, freed monks from celibacy, advocated for tribal society like Kaibarta and Karbi and other marginalised communities, taught swaraj and performed satyagraha in 1941. Goswami was arrested in 1943, and imprisoned for two years.

He taught Vaishnavism and helped the Karbi people in the hilly interior of present-day Karbi Anglong district after his release from prison, opening 20 primary schools and walking to visit remote areas. In 1922 Goswami established a theatre, using casts of boys and girls instead of traditional all-male casts. Yugadrashta: The Visionary is a 2013 short film on the life of the reformer.

== Legacy ==
Though considered a reformer by his followers, Pitambar Deva Goswami headed the Garamur Satra which followed a rigid caste system, untouchability, performed idol worship and brahminical rituals deviating from the teaching of Sankardeva.

== Sources ==
- Shin, Jae-Eun (2017), "Transition of Satra from a Venue of Bhakti Movement to the Orthodox Brahmanical Institution", in Ota, Nobuhiro (ed.), Clustering and Connections in Pre-Modern South Asian Society, Tokyo: Tokyo University of Foreign Studies, pp. 237–257
- Kashyap, Samudra Gupta (10 July 2000). "More reconversion stories, this time from Assam". Express India. Archived from the original on 17 May 2008.
- Nagchoudhury, Subrata (28 February 1997). "Majuli: Island On The Ebb". India Today. Archived from the original on 9 July 2008.
- Nath, Dr Dambarudhar (2012). "Satra Society and culture – Pitambardeva Goswami and History of Garamur Satra". DVS Publisher. Archived from the original on 17 October 2013.
