= Mahindra Legend =

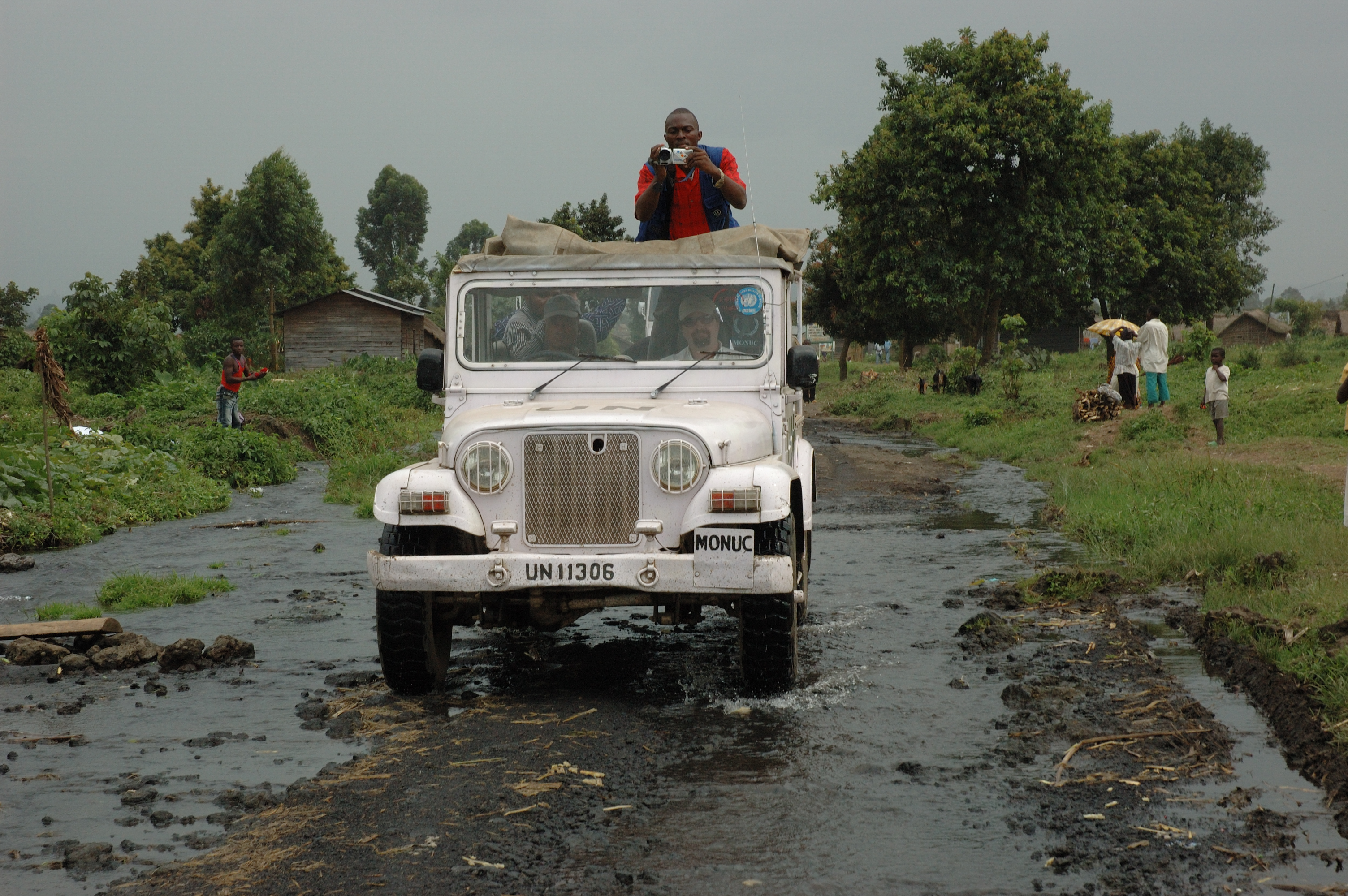
Mahindra Jeep used by MONUC in DR of Congo

The Mahindra Legend is a limited-edition, four-wheel-drive vehicle based on the Mahindra MM540 series jeeps built for the Indian Armed Forces. The Legend was manufactured to celebrate the 60th anniversary of the Indian automotive company, Mahindra & Mahindra. Only 60 examples were built and owners were chosen through invitation.

Mahindra Legend has a 2,523 cc (154.0 cu in) engine and seating for six occupants. The Legend is a copy of the Jeep CJ and has often been criticized for its poor handling and low fuel efficiency.
