= Tata 407 =

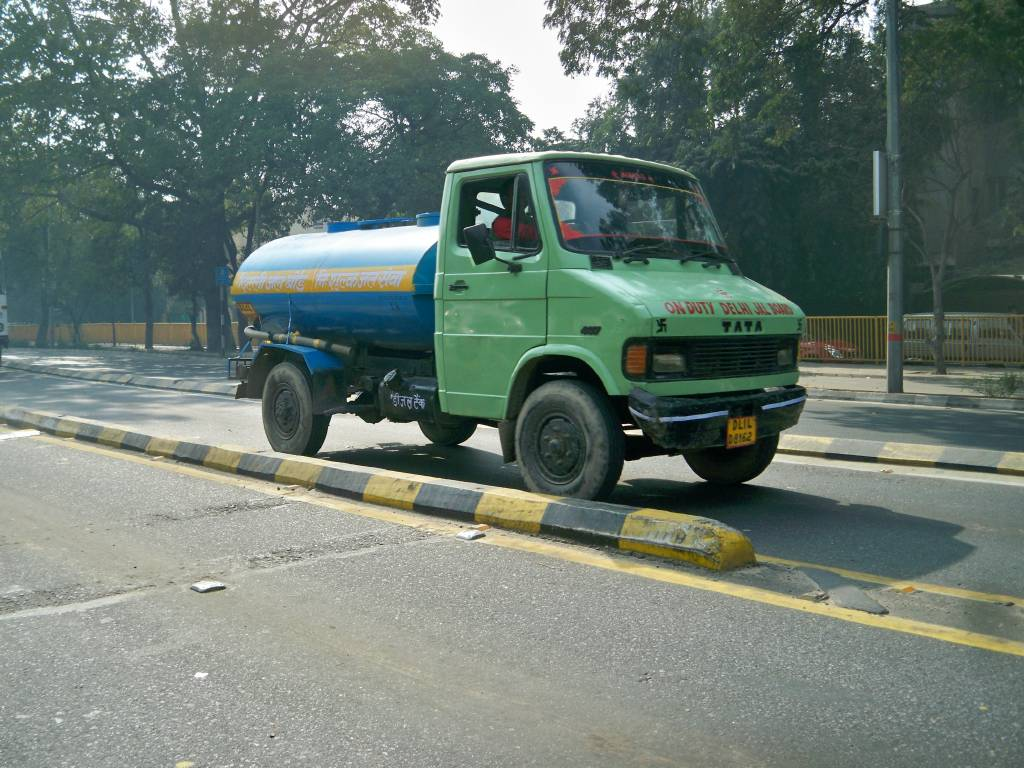
- Tata 407 water truck

Overview
- Manufacturer: Tata Motors
- Production: 1986–present

Body and chassis
- Class: Light commercial vehicle
- Body style: 2-door pickup truck
- Related: Hanomag F-series; Steyr 591/691

Powertrain
- Engine: 3.0L 4SP diesel I4; 3.0L Dicor diesel I4

The Tata 407 is a light commercial vehicle manufactured by Tata Motors. Launched in February 21, 1986, as of 2011 the 407 model sold more than 500,000 units. The 407 has a payload of 2.25 tonnes, an overall length of 4.7 metres, and a turning circle radius of 5.5 metres. Tata purchased all of the pressing tools for Steyr's 591/691-series of trucks in the mid-eighties, a truck which was itself derived from the 1967 Hanomag F-series. The shape of cab barely shares a close resemblance to the Mercedes-Benz Vario, however the only difference is the slope of the hood.

== Models ==
The 407 model range includes trucks, tippers, pick-ups and vehicles for agri/food products, construction, light mining and services.

Tata's Cityride buses are based on the 407 and are available in 12–24 seat variants and following the company's joint venture with Marcopolo S.A. of Brazil in 2006, the 407 platform is now included in the Starbus range in a 24-seat variant and 12–18 seat luxury variants.

The facelifted EX-2 Refresh series was launched in the latter half of the 2000s, and in 2009 it was joined by the 407 Pick-up. This new model had the shortest overall length, the smallest turning circle, the largest loading area, and the highest payload in the category at the time.

== Engines ==
TATA launched 407 compressed natural gas (CNG) engine option in 2009 and diesel engine option in 2010 due to the huge potential in both markets.
