= Kuladhar Saikia =

Indian Author and former Director General of Police of Assam

Director General of Police of Assam
- In office 1 May 2018 – 30 November 2019
- Preceded by: Mukesh Saha
- Succeeded by: Bhaskar Jyoti Mahanta

Personal details
- Born: 9 January 1959 (age 67) Rangia, Kamrup, Assam, India
- Education: (B.A.) Ramjas College (M.A.) Delhi School of Economics; Delhi University (PhD) IIT Guwahati; Pennsylvania State University (Fulbright scholar)
- Occupation: Author and former Indian Police Service officer
- Awards: President's Police Medal, Katha Award, Sahitya Akademi Award

Kuladhar Saikia (born 9 January 1959) is an Indian author and retired 1985 batch Indian Police Service officer who served as Director General of Police of Assam from 2018 to 2019. He has been involved in issues relating to Community Development and was awarded President's Police Medal twice for his outstanding contribution to policing. He was the initiator and Nodal officer of Assam Police community empowerment initiative called "Project Prahari" and one of the founders of Economic Policy Research group called Assam Prakalpa. He was awarded the prestigious Katha Award in 2000 and Sahitya Akademi Award in 2015 for his short stories. He was elected President of Asam Sahitya Sabha in January 2020.

== Early life and education ==
Kuladhar Saikia was born on 9 January 1959 in Rangia, Assam, India. He completed his Bachelor of Arts degree from Ramjas College and his Master of Arts degree from Delhi School of Economics both under Delhi University and his PhD in economics from IIT Guwahati. He was also a Fulbright scholar at Pennsylvania State University in the United States.

== Civil Service career ==
Saikia is a 1985 batch Indian Police Service officer from Assam and Meghalaya cadre. Before joining Indian Police Service, Saikia was an Indian Economic Service officer where he worked with the government in policy making. He has also served as a consultant to the World Bank at their headquarters in the Washington D.C. As an IPS officer he served as the Director General of Police of Assam from 2018 to 2019. He was awarded twice the President's Police Medal because of his contribution towards policing.

== Change agent ==
A three-part case series had been published by Harvard Business Review titled, "Being a Change Agent" set in a rural district of Assam in India. It describes the efforts made by Kuladhar Saikia, then Deputy Inspector General of Police in the early 2000s, to tackle witchcraft-related crimes that were prevalent in this isolated and economically backward part of the country. Determined to end the social evil that still haunts rural and backward areas of Assam, Saikia's initiative and perseverance has resulted in raising awareness about the scourge of witchcraft that is often used bizarrely to settle personal scores and land disputes in villages.

Kuladhar Saikia initiated the project in 2001 by running campaigns involving village chiefs and elders, said the involvement of entire communities and the lack of evidence due to the fear of being ostracised had made the task of apprehending the culprits quite challenging. Project Prahari has brought together different stakeholders – student groups, science clubs, mahila samitis and other social activists on a common platform.

== Awards and recognition ==
- Munin Borkotoky Award (1998) for Akhorot Moi Aru Anyanya (আখৰাত মই আৰু অন্যান্য), a collection of short stories
- Kotha Award (2000)
- Rashtrapati Arakhyi Award received twice
- Sahitya Academy Award (2015) for Akashar Chhabi Aru Anyanya Galpa

== Asam Sahitya Sabha ==
Saikia is the president of Asam Sahitya Sabha and he has appealed on social media to contribute to the field of Assamese Wikipedia as well as various methods for the preservation of the Assamese language on digital platforms. This has helped many people to learn about the Assamese Wikipedia and many interested people to create accounts on Wikipedia.
