= Sonowal Khel =

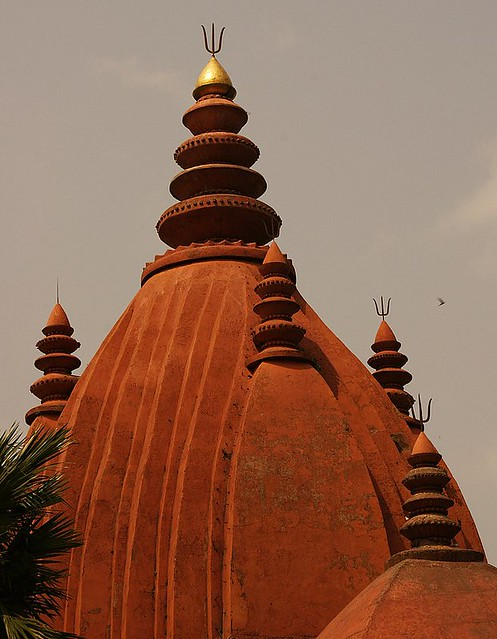
A 8-foot-high golden-dome crowned on Sivadol in Sivasagar, Assam

Sonowal is a designation of the gold-washers of Assam. They were previously addressed as Xunia Thakur.

== Etymology ==
The name Sonowal comes from the word 'Son' (Assamese: সোন/Xün) which means gold in Assamese. (Note: "Sarbananda Sonowal, ‘national hero’ who struck gold for BJP in Assam", Hindustan Times)

== History ==
Sonowal was a multicaste 'khel' (guild) of the many khels that existed in the Ahom Kingdom of the late medieval period. This khel was involved in the gold-washing business and it consisted of paiks from different communities viz, Kacharis, Bihiyas (Chutias), Koch, and Keot. However, the Kachari and Bihiya Sonowals were most numerous. Most of these Sonowals migrated from Sadiya and Sisi-Dhemaji regions respectively and resided in the forested area between the Buri Dihing and Dibru rivers (Matak territories) during the early 19th century. Gold-washing was the occupation of Sonowal paiks but other paiks sometimes used to join them and receives their share.

Although the designation of these paiks was Sonowal, they were generally known only by the names of their 'khel' or tribe or chief under whom they resided. They were placed in different parts of the country (Assam) under the authority of Phukans, Baruahs and other chiefs.

However, the Kachari Sonowal was a distinct class from rest of the Sonowals. And unlike others, they were entirely under the orders of the King himself, and they supplied him with gold when called upon to do so. They formerly resided at Sadiya and its vicinity.

== Surnames ==
The paiks in a khel were organized under a gradation of officials who commanded a set number of them. They were Bora (20 paiks), Saikia (100), Hazarika (1000), Baruah and Phukan (6000).

The designations Thengal Baruah and Sonowal Baruah were introduced only in the reign of the Ahom King Purandar Singha (1818–19, 1833–1838). These officers remained in overall charges of these guilds and had to take a note of the total output of such washings conducted under the state initiative.

== Notable Sonowals ==
- Sarbananda Sonowal, Indian politician, former chief minister of Assam.
- Jogendra Nath Hazarika, Indian politician, former chief minister of Assam.
- Pradan Baruah, Indian politician, former member of Assam Legislative assembly, MP of Lakhimpur Lok Sabha.
- Jogesh Das, prominent writer, recipient of Sahitya Academi Award
- Lohit Sonowal, inspector of Commando Battalion of Assam Police, awarded the Kirti Chakra military decoration

== See also ==
- Sonowal Kacharis
- Thengal Kacharis
- Rupowal Khel
