= Saikia =

Saikia was a Paik officer of the Ahom militia who led a hundred paiks. The Koch kingdom had a similar system in place. As it was a purely administrative position, the title holder could belong to diverse ethnic groups or religions. Today, this title is used as a surname by Assamese people of various ethnic origins. The post of Saikia in the Paik system was higher in rank to the Bora (in charge of 20 paiks) but lower in rank to the Hazarika (in charge of a thousand paiks).

== Etymology ==
The word Saikia is a derivative of the Assamese word - Xô, meaning 'one hundred - 100'. The original Tai-Ahom name of the position was ru-pāk which later was translated as 'Saikia' in Assamese.

== Historical usage ==
Among other ethnic groups, there is mention of Chutia Saikias in several instances of Buranjis. For instance, during the revolt of 1775, ten Chutia Saikias were involved along with a Nara chief of Khamjang (Kachin state of Myanmar). After the fall of the Chutia kingdom, Saikias were also appointed among Chutia blacksmiths and other guilds to look after the works. Apart from these, during the Moamoria rebellion, the rebels also appointed Saikias among themselves.

== Current usage ==
Over the years, the usage of this title has ceased to be a professional or military title. The Ahom paik titles were conferred by the king regardless of the ethnicity, caste or religion of the officer. Hence, the descendents of these officers now use it as a surname. Some communities which use this title are- Sutiya, Koch, Sonowal Kacharis, Thengal Kacharis and Kalitas etc.

== Notable people ==
- Anjana Saikia - sportwomen
- Ankush Saikia - novelist, editor, and former journalist
- Anupam Saikia - mathematician
- Baneswar Saikia - politician of Revolutionary Communist Party of India
- Bhabendra Nath Saikia - physicist, novelist, film director.
- Binoy Kumar Saikia - scientist
- Debabrata Saikia - politician
- Devajit Saikia- Indian advocate, former first class cricketer, cricket administrator.
- Dilip Saikia - politician
- Hemoprova Saikia - politician
- Hiteswar Saikia - politician, Chief Minister of Assam from 1983 to 1985 and 1991–1996.
- Kuladhar Saikia-
- Mrinal Saikia - Indian politician
- Nagen Saikia - author
- Nayanmoni Saikia- athlete
- Sarat Saikia, politician
- Yasmin Saikia - author
