= Sonowal =

Sonowal may refer to:

- Sonowal Kacharis, an ethnic group in Assam
- Sonowal Khel, an artisan class of medieval Assam
- Jyotsna Sonowal, Indian politician
- Lohit Sonowal, Commando Battalion of Assam Police
- Naren Sonowal, Indian politician
- Sarbananda Sonowal, Indian politician
