= Pritam =

Pritam is a given name of Indian origin. Notable people with the name include:

- Pritam Chakraborty, Indian composer
- Pritom Hasan, Bangladeshi singer
- Pritam Singh, Singaporean politician
- Pritam Singh Panwar, Indian politician
- Pritam Singh Safir, Indian poet
- Pritam Singh (gymnast), Indian gymnast
- Pritam Singh Kasad, Indian poet
- Pritam Singh (politician, born 1958), Indian politician
- Pritam Singh (educationist), Indian educationist
- Pritam Singh (soldier), Indian soldier
- Pritam Singh Sandhu, Indian hockey player
- Pritam Munde, Indian politician
- Pritam Bhartwan, Indian singer
- Pritam Kagne, Indian actress
- Pritam Kotal,,Indian footballer
- Pritam Gandhe, Indian cricketer
- Pritam Chakraborty (cricketer), Indian cricketer
- Pritam Das (Udasi), Indian saint
- Pritam Rani Siwach, Indian hockey player
- Pritam Pal, Indian judge
- Pritam Saini, Indian journalist
- Pritam Patil, Indian cricketer
- Pritam Deb, Indian physicist
- Pritam Hazarika, Indian cricketer
- Pritam Ram, Indian politician
