= Bora (surname) =

Bora, also spelled Borah or Barah, is an Indian surname used commonly throughout Assam. It's also used among Kumaoni Rajputs of Uttarakhand.

== Historical usage ==
Originally, the Bora surname was used as a high military position/title in the Chutia Kingdom held by individuals from the Buruk clan. The officials were collectively termed as Bora-Buruk. The officials Barua and Borpatra also formed a part of this system. There were originally two classes of Bora officials - one involved in administration (Sashanar Bora) and the other involved in temple security (Thanar Bora). Some examples of that era include Dhela Bora and Harisingh Bora who were Chutia officials.

Later, after the introduction of the Paik system in the Ahom Kingdom of medieval Assam, the title was re-introduced. A Bora was the commanding officer of 20 such paiks. The appointment of a Bora was the responsibility of his Phukan or Rajkhowa (governor of a territory). The paiks had the right to reject a Saikia and request another officer of their choice. Appointments were made irrespective of the paik's religion or ethnicity.

There is mention of Chutia Boras and Matak Boras in Buranjis at several instances. For example, during the revolt of 1775, Phukans and Baruas were appointed from Barechiringias and Chutia Boras. The Lecham Chetia family descended from Tekela Bora, who was a prisoner of Chutia origin. Chandrakanta Singha appointed his friend Satram, who was the son of a Kukurachuwa Bora of Chutia origin, as Charingia Phukan. During the first Burmese invasion, the king sent Lapi Dadhara Bora of Chutia Gharphalia family, along with other officers to fight with the Burmese. Other‌ examples of Chutia Bora include Hao Bora, Nokh Bora and Langi Deka Bora (of Langi Deka origin) who fought against the Burmese. Apart from these, during the Moamoria rebellion, the Matak rebels also appointed Boras among themselves. As per the historical account Ahomar Din, Boras were at one point appointed from Sonowal Kacharis and Thengal Kacharis as well.

== Notable people ==
Notable people with the surname include:

- Atul Bora (born 1960), president of the political party Asom Gana Parishad
- Bhupen Kumar Borah, politician
- Bimal Bora, politician
- Biswajeet Bora, filmmaker
- Dhrubajyoti Bora (born 1955), Indian novelist from Assam
- Dipankar Borah, botanist
- Gautam Bora, politician
- Jatin Bora (born 1970), Indian film actor from Assam
- Kiran Bala Bora, freedom fighter
- Kopil Bora (born 1977), Indian film actor from Assam
- Lakshmi Nandan Bora (1932–2021), Indian novelist and short story writer
- Mahim Bora (1924–2019), Indian writer and educationist from Assam
- Mayur Bora, academic
- Neha Bora, political activist
- Nomal Chandra Borah (born 1950), Indian neurologist from Assam
- Panchi Bora, Indian television actress and model from Assam
- Pankaj Bora, politician
- Prodyut Bora (born 1974), Indian politician and social activist from Assam
- Rajesh Borah, cricketer
- Ripun Bora (born 1955), Indian politician from Assam
- Sibamoni Bora, politician
- Utpal Borah, politician

== See also ==
- Yoon Bo-ra, a South Korean idol singer
- Bora (disambiguation)
