= Sanwal =

Sanwal is a given name and a surname originlating in the Indian subcontinent. Notable people with the name include:

- Aditi Sanwal, Indian actress
- Sanwal Esakhelvi, British-Pakistani visual effects supervisor, sound designer, singer, musician and songwriter

== See also ==
- Sanval (disambiguation)
- Sanwali
- Sunwal
- Sonowal
