= Pritam Singh (disambiguation) =

Pritam Singh (born 1976) is a Singaporean politician.

Pritam Singh may also refer to:

== Military ==
- Giani Pritam Singh Dhillon (died 1942), Indian freedom fighter and Sikh missionary
- Pritam Singh (soldier) (fl. 1942–1951), Indian Army officer

== Politics ==
- Pritam Singh (politician, born 1958) (born 1958), Indian politician in Uttarakhand
- Pritam Singh Panwar (born 1966), Indian politician in Uttarakhand

== Sports ==
- Pritam Singh (gymnast) (1924–1996), Indian Olympic gymnast
- Ningthoujam Pritam Singh (born 1993), Indian footballer
- Pritam Kumar Singh (born 1995), Indian footballer

== Other ==
- Pritam Singh Safir, (1916–1999), Indian poet
- Pritam Singh (educationist) (1941–2020), Indian academic, educationist, and management professor
