= Haiwaan (film) =

2026 Indian film by Priyadarshan

- Theatrical release poster
- Directed by: Priyadarshan
- Screenplay by: Rohan Shankar; Abilash Nair; Priyadarshan
- Dialogues by: Rohan Shankar
- Based on: Oppam by Priyadarshan
- Produced by: Venkat K. Narayana; Shailaja Desai Fenn
- Starring: Saif Ali Khan; Akshay Kumar; Boman Irani; Shriya Pilgaonkar; Saiyami Kher
- Cinematography: Divakar Mani
- Edited by: M. S. Aiyyappan Nair
- Music by: Songs: Pritam; Score: Ronnie Raphael
- Production companies: KVN Productions; Thespian Films
- Distributed by: Pen Marudhar
- Release date: 11 September 2026
- Running time: 164 minutes
- Country: India
- Language: Hindi
- Budget: est. ₹100–115 crore (Note: Mayapuri reported that the production budget is estimated to be around ₹100–115 crore.)
- Box office: ₹4.29 crore

Haiwaan (transl. Beast; lit. 'Animal') is a 2026 Indian Hindi-language crime comedy thriller film co-written and directed by Priyadarshan. Produced by KVN Productions and Thespian Films, it is a remake of Priyadarshan's own 2016 Malayalam film Oppam, and stars Saif Ali Khan, Akshay Kumar, Boman Irani, Shriya Pilgaonkar and Saiyami Kher while Mohanlal makes a cameo appearance. It marks the final film appearance of Asrani, who died in October 2025.

The film was released theatrically on 11 September 2026.

== Plot ==
Shyam Rane (Saif Ali Khan) is a visually impaired caretaker working at a high-rise apartment complex in Mumbai. Despite his blindness, Shyam possesses extraordinary auditory acuity, spatial awareness, and training in martial arts. Over the years, he builds a close, loyal friendship with retired Judge Pradhan (Boman Irani), one of the building's residents.

Years earlier, Judge Pradhan had presided over a high-profile court case and wrongfully convicted an innocent man, Parshuram Gokhale (Akshay Kumar), based on fabricated evidence. During Parshuram's imprisonment, his entire family committed suicide due to social stigma and financial distress. Consumed by grief and hatred, Parshuram spends his years in prison planning a meticulous vendetta to eliminate everyone involved in his conviction, along with their family members.

Upon his release, Parshuram initiates a series of targeted killings. Fearing for his own life, Judge Pradhan confides in Shyam about his past error. He reveals the existence of his secret young daughter, Nandini (Pahal Ashok Chaudhary), who lives at a secluded convent school. Pradhan entrusts Shyam with securing funds for Nandini's education and protecting her if anything happens to him.

Parshuram infiltrates the residential complex disguised as a service worker and assassinates Judge Pradhan in his apartment. Shyam enters the apartment shortly after and engages in a brief physical struggle with the intruder, but Parshuram manages to escape. Arriving shortly after, the police find Shyam covered in blood beside the body. Due to circumstantial evidence and initial skepticism regarding his blindness, the investigating officers designate Shyam as the prime suspect and place him under arrest.

While in custody, Shyam overhears police conversations and realizes Parshuram has discovered Nandini’s identity and location. Recognizing that the girl is in immediate danger, Shyam escapes from police custody. He becomes a wanted fugitive, pursued by the authorities while simultaneously tracking Parshuram to protect Nandini.

Shyam reaches the convent school, retrieves Nandini, and takes her to a secluded estate. Parshuram tracks them to the location and cuts the main power grid during a thunderstorm, plunging the building into complete darkness. Although Parshuram intends to use the darkness to isolate his targets, the environment removes his visual advantage and benefits Shyam, who relies entirely on sound, touch, and spatial memory.

In the ensuing confrontation, Shyam uses his heightened senses to counter Parshuram’s attacks, eventually disabling the killer. Police forces arrive at the scene shortly after, capturing Parshuram and clearing Shyam of all charges. Nandini is safely placed under the care of Pradhan's trusted associates, fulfilling Shyam's promise to his late friend.

== Cast ==
- Akshay Kumar as Parshuram Gokhale, the main antagonist
- Saif Ali Khan as Shyam Rane, the main protagonist
- Shriya Pilgaonkar as Naina
- Saiyami Kher as Inspector Varsha Joshi
- Boman Irani as Judge Pradhan
- Asrani as Hussein, a security guard
- Sharib Hashmi as Senior Inspector Ashok Shinde
- Rajpal Yadav as Chandu, an auto driver
- Rajesh Sharma as SP Rohit Vardhan
- Manoj Joshi as Pandurang
- Pahal Chaudhary as Nandini
- Naira Shah as Simran
- Kiran Dange as Manya
- Abeer Meherish as Nagesh
- Kalpana Rao as Saithabma
- Kanchan Pagare as Sudhir, a security guard
- Ashish Gokhale as SI Pandey
- Suchitra Pillai as Principal
- Ashok Kelkar as Pillai
- Yamini Joshi as Shraddha
- Zeeshan Ali as Joy
- Krishna Kotian as Mr. Bareeto
- Naresh Asija as Mr. Gulati
- Donny Kapoor as Mrs. Gulati
- Bhavna Pani as Zeba Ahmed
- Radhika Chavan as Mary
- Mohit Raj as Albert
- Mohanlal as Jayaraman (cameo appearance)

== Production ==
=== Development ===
Pre-production began in May 2025. The film's title was revealed as Haiwaan. The film was announced in July 2025, a remake of the 2016 Malayalam film Oppam, starring Akshay Kumar and Saif Ali Khan.

=== Casting ===
In April 2025, it was reported that Saif Ali Khan would appear in the film. Initially, Bobby Deol was considered for the antagonist's role, but declined as he was not happy with the part. Akshaye Khanna was then approached before Akshay Kumar was cast in the film. In August 2025, Asrani, Shriya Pilgaonkar and Saiyami Kher joined the cast. Mohanlal, who played the lead in the original film, was confirmed to make a cameo appearance. In December 2025, Jisshu Sengupta was confirmed to have joined the cast.

=== Filming ===
Principal photography began in August 2025 in Kochi, Kerala, with scenes filmed in the Panampilly Nagar area. Production subsequently moved to Vagamon and Ooty, which was completed within the same month.

In mid-October, the unit returned to Mumbai for the final schedule. Portions of the film were shot at several locations, including Churchgate railway station, Chhatrapati Shivaji Maharaj Terminus, Bandra Kurla Complex and Alibaug.

Asrani completed filming before his death. Mohanlal filmed a cameo appearance, while Shriya Pilgaonkar announced that she had completed filming her portions.

Filming wrapped in December 2025 at St. Xavier's College, Mumbai. The film was shot extensively in multiple locations including Kochi, Vagamon, Ooty and Mumbai. Post-production was completed in July 2026.

== Music ==
The soundtrack has been composed by Pritam, with lyrics written by Javed Akhtar. The film score was composed by Ronnie Raphael.

The first single "Mera Hero Hai Woh" was released on 19 August 2026. The second single "Rangiyara" was released on 31 August 2026. The third single "Main Toh Nahi Haiwaan" was released on 7 September 2026.

Track listing
No.	Title	Lyrics	Singer(s)	Length
1.	"Mera Hero Hai Woh"	Javed Akhtar	Shaan, Vanika Nayak	3:34
2.	"Rangiyara"	Yatindra Mishra, Thomson Andrews	Shaan, Sukhwinder Singh, Romy	3:26
3.	"Main Toh Nahi Haiwaan"	Kumaar	Raghav Chaitanya	2:56

== Marketing ==
The first look posters were unveiled on 15 July 2026. The teaser was revealed on 12 August 2026. The official trailer was revealed on 25 August 2026.

== Release ==
=== Theatrical ===
The film was theatrically released on 11 September 2026.

=== Home media ===
In a pre-release deal, Sony Pictures Networks acquired the post-theatrical digital and satellite rights of the film for ₹80 crore.

=== Certification ===
The film received a U/A 16+ certificate on 8 September 2026 by the Central Board of Film Certification (CBFC) after certain cuts. The CBFC's Examining Committee asked the makers to suitably modify a visual in the first half of the film, delete a derogatory sentence and replace the same with, "Dimaag ki vaat laga ke rakh di," (loosely translated: "Messed up my mind,") around the intermission in the film and delete a word and replace the same with 'kamina' (meaning 'scoundrel') in the second half of the film. There were no visual cuts enforced by the CBFC. The runtime of the film is 164.07 minutes.

== Reception ==
=== Critical response ===
On the review aggregator website Rotten Tomatoes, 30% of 10 critics' reviews are positive, with an average rating of 5/10.

Saibal Chatterjee of NDTV gave the film 3 stars out of 5, noting, "Textually similar, texturally different and tonally entirely its own beast, Haiwaan, starring Akshay Kumar and Saif Ali Khan, struggles to shrug off the shadow of Mohanlal and Oppam (2016)."

Rishabh Suri of Hindustan Times also gave the film 3 stars out of 5. He had some praise for Priyadarshan's direction, writing, "Priyadarshan is good at building worlds and creating a sense of atmosphere, and Haiwaan has a few sequences where he does that rather convincingly." However, he criticised the plot and Saif Ali Khan being unconvincing as a visually impaired man, writing, "The film leading up to the climax, however, is riddled with plot holes. Saif Ali Khan is not convincing as a visually impaired man from the very beginning." Being critical of the film's soundtrack, he wrote, "Pritam's music is one of the film's weakest links." He also observed that Akshay Kumar's acting potential was held back and wasted by the poor writing of the film, writing, "Akshay Kumar could have done so much more with Parshuram had the writing given him more to work with."

Shweta Keshri of India Today gave the film 2.5 stars out of 5 and pointed out, "Here is the central issue. Haiwaan's villain needed to be genuinely frightening — the kind of threat that makes you understand why an entire film has been built around stopping him. Akshay Kumar has played antagonists before and done it well. But the Haiwaan on screen is not haiwaaning enough. This Haiwaan is not beast enough. The performance leans into over-the-top in a way that tips occasionally into unintentional comedy rather than dread. The final sequence, in particular, which should have been the film's most tense passage, lands differently than intended."

Renuka Vyavahare of The Times of India also gave the film 2.5 stars out of 5 and concluded in her review, "Barring a few effective hide-and-seek action sequences between the two leads, Haiwaan struggles to grip. It picks up somewhat after the interval, but with a runtime of 2 hours and 44 minutes, the film ultimately stretches a thin premise far beyond its limits leaving little impact by the time it ends. The Conjuring-style finale takes the tension out of the climax, veering into unintentional humour."

A critic at Bollywood Hungama gave the film 2.5 stars out of 5 as well, concluding, "On the whole, HAIWAAN rests on Saif Ali Khan and Akshay Kumar's performances, a few engaging face-offs and strong technical values. However, the disjointed screenplay, excessive subplots, weak songs and an underwhelming climax limit its impact. With the hype around the film also being quite low, its box-office prospects appear dim.

Shubhra Gupta of The Indian Express gave the film 2 stars out of 5 and summed up in her review, "When Priyadarshan is on top of his game, all his madly-disparate moving parts somehow come together and give us a rumbustious climax. Sadly, Haiwaan is more miss than hit, more uff uff than ole ole."

Shachi Chaturvedi of News18 also gave the film 2 stars out of 5, concluding, "What makes Haiwaan particularly disappointing is the fact that it brings together Akshay Kumar and Saif Ali Khan after 17 years. Two stars of their stature and talent should have had far better material to work with. Instead, they spend much of the film trying to carry a sloppy screenplay on their shoulders, and even their combined presence isn't enough to rescue it. Haiwaan might just leave you hairaan and pareshan. You're better off waiting for its OTT release, because you might need a few breaks to make it through this one."

Nandini Ramnath of Scroll.in critiqued, "Every detail is spelt out, resulting not just in a very slow set-up but also enhanced awareness among viewers of how absurd the premise is. When a film refuses to get going, it's easier to spot the gaps in the writing, the convenient ruses created to give Shyam an upper hand over a supposedly maniacal, deadly adversary."

Rahul Desai of The Hollywood Reporter India, highly critical of the film, ended his review with, "The most constructive criticism I can offer is: Why? The kindest thing I can say about Haiwaan is that it ends."

Sukanya Verma of Rediff.com gave the film 1 star out of 5, writing, "Watching Haiwaan is such a tormenting exercise, I wonder whether everyone associated with this monstrosity made a secret pact to remain blindfolded at the time of script reading."

Aishani Biswas of Outlook also gave the film 1 star out of 5, writing, "At 2 hours and 44 minutes, Haiwaan has enough running time to build a genuinely absorbing psychological thriller. Instead, its length exposes how much of the screenplay is unnecessary. The editing and background score occasionally create the required tension, but neither can compensate for a story that keeps veering off course." She appreciated Saif Ali Khan's portrayal, writing, "Playing a blind character for the first time, he gives Shyam a physicality that doesn't rely on exaggerated gestures. His movements, listening and spatial awareness create a believable sense of how the character negotiates the world." She also appreciated Akshay Kumar's screen presence in spite of the writing, noting, "His presence is stronger than the writing behind him." Furthermore, she noted, "The film also touches on police brutality and the way institutional power can turn vulnerable people into convenient suspects. These ideas could have given Haiwaan a darker moral centre. Instead, the screenplay keeps looking for shortcuts."
