= Garikapati Narahari Sastry =

Indian chemist

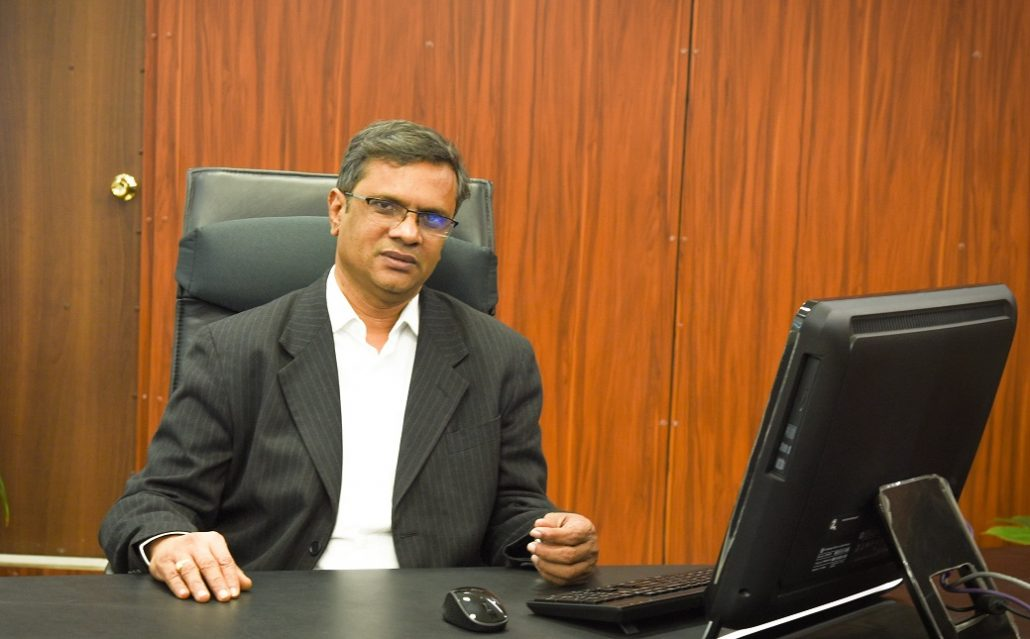
- Sastry in 2019
- Born: 1966 (age 59–60); Andhra Pradesh, India
- Education: Osmania University, University of Hyderabad
- Known for: Molecular Modeling and Computer-Aided Drug Design
- Scientific career
- Fields: Chemistry, theoretical chemistry, Computer Aided Drug Design
- Workplaces: IIT-Hyderabad; North East Institute of Science and Technology, Jorhat; Indian Institute of Chemical Technology; Pondicherry University
- Doctoral advisor: Eluvathingal Devassy Jemmis,
- Other academic advisors: Sason Shaik
- Website: https://iith.ac.in/bt/gnsastry/

Garikapati Narahari Sastry is an Indian Chemist and a Professor at the Department of Biotechnology at IIT-Hyderabad. He served as Director of CSIR- North East Institute of Science and Technology, Jorhat Jorhat, Assam from 19 February 2019 and served there till 10 January 2024. After taking charge as the Director, he has worked towards converting knowledge in the areas of computational modelling and Artificial intelligence from basic to translational research, by working closely with society and industry. Ultimately, revitalizing the strength of science and technology is essential in achieving the self-reliant and strong India. In the era of Industry 4.0 and 5.0, combining our traditional wisdom with modern science appear to be indispensable in the sectors such as Education, Health, Agriculture, Industrial and Societal development at large. Prior to joining as the Director, he headed the Molecular Modelling Division at the CSIR Indian Institute of Chemical Technology in Hyderabad, India. Sastry has made pioneering contributions in the areas of computational chemistry and computational biology.

He was awarded Shanti Swarup Bhatnagar Prize for Science and Technology in 2011, the highest science award in India, in the chemical sciences category.

== Early life and education ==
G. N. Sastry completed his BSc (1985) and MSc (1988) from Osmania University. He earned his PhD from University of Hyderabad in Theoretical and Computational Chemistry under the supervision of Prof. E. D. Jemmis in 1995. Subsequently, he moved to Israel to carry out his first postdoctoral studies (1994 – 1996) with Prof. Sason Shaik in Hebrew University where he majorly focused on valance bond modelling and electronic transfer reactions. In 1996, he moved to Switzerland and did his second postdoctoral studies with Prof. Thomas Bally in University of Fibourg, Switzerland. In Switzerland he worked in Molecular modelling and theoretical and physical organic chemistry.

== Career ==
After two postdoctoral stints, he moved to India and he has served as Assistant Professor in Pondicherry University for five years (1997 – 2002). There majorly focused on Molecular modelling and theoretical and physical organic chemistry. In 2002 he moved to CSIR – Indian Institute of Chemical Technology, Hyderabad where he served for almost two decades and made fundamental contributions in supramolecular chemistry which itself is a highly interdisciplinary areas. On 19 February 2019, he took charge as a Director in CSIR – North East Institute of Science and Technology, Jorhat, Assam and served their till 10 January 2024. He is currently a Professor in the Department of Biotechnology and a core faculty member of the Computational Engineering program at IIT Hyderabad. He also serves as the Dean (Sponsored Research and Consultancy).

== Scientific contributions ==
Sastry leads a highly interdisciplinary research group with expertise spanning chemistry, biology, materials science, and computer science. He has authored over 300 research papers, which have received approximately 11,000 citations, resulting in an h-index of 52. His work includes significant contributions to the study of noncovalent interactions, computer aided drug design, bucky bowl chemistry, and applications of machine learning in computational drug discovery. He is also interested to unravel ~5000 years of traditional knowledge with 100 years of modern science. DISHA (Development of Informatics for Societal Health Advancement) has been conceived by Dr. G.N. Sastry with the aim to leverage the activities of data driven approaches in healthcare.

In the last decade, his group is involved in developing an indigenous software, Molecular Property Diagnostic Suite (MPDS), which aims to strengthen the computational drug discovery, and thereby working towards Aatmanirbhar Bharat. Dr. Sastry is also involved in a number of outreach programs and widely traveled across the globe and has visited over 25 countries. His stays as a visiting professor (faculty) in Japan, USA, Germany and Switzerland, besides several short visits to attend and organize meetings abroad has established a strong relationship in building international collaborations across the disciplines.

== Fellowships and memberships ==
- Fellow of Indian National Science Academy (FNA)
- Fellow of Indian Academy of Sciences (FASc)
- Fellow of National Academy of Sciences India (FNASc)
- Fellow of Royal Society of Chemistry (FRSC)
- Fellow of Biotech Research Society, India (BRSI)
- Fellow of Telangana Academy of Sciences (Founder Fellow)
- Fellow of Andhra Pradesh Akademi of Sciences (FAPAS)
- Life member of World Association of Theoretically Oriented Chemists (WATOC)
- Life member of American Chemical Society (ACS)
- Life member of Asia-Pacific Conference of Theoretical and Computational Chemistry (APCTCC)
- Life member of Chemical Research Society of India (CRSI)
- Life member of Andhra Pradesh Akademi of Sciences
- Life member of Indian Biophysical Society
- Life member of Bioinformatics and Drug Discovery Society (BIDDS)

== Prizes and honours ==
- Recipient of J. C. Bose National Fellowship of the Department of Science and Technology, New Delhi – 2015
- Shanti Swarup Bhatnagar Prize for Science and Technology – 2011.
- B. M. Birla Scientist prize for chemistry – 2001
- The Alexander von Humboldt Fellowship
- The Swarnajayanti Fellowship – 2005
- National Bioscience Award for Career Development 2009
- The CRSI Medal – 2010
- B. C. Deb Memorial Award for Soil/ Physical Chemistry, Indian Science Congress, 2008
- Special Award for Promotion of Ethnopharmacology, International Congress for Society for Ethnopharmacology, 2022
- A species of begonia was named 'Begonia Narahari'.
- CRSI Silver Medal for the year 2024.
- Lifetime achievement award for excellence in teaching and research from BIOCLUES, 2024.
- Lifetime Achievement Award in Pharmacy by the Association of Biotechnology and Pharmacy (ABAP), 2025.

== Leadership activities ==
As the Director, Dr. Sastry led many major programs and creating facilities contributing to the northeast region as well as nation.

- CSIR Summer Research Training Programme 2020, 16 June – 22 Aug 2020
- Drug Discovery Hackathon 2020 Training programme, 13 July 2020 - 12 Sept 2020
- Drug Discovery Hackathon 2020 Mentorship and Training programme, 30 September 2021 - 31 March 2022
- Convenor of Hyderabad- Heidelberg Hub for Advanced Chemical Education (HHHACE) -Indo-German winter school on theoretical and computational chemistry-2024.
- Establishment of Covid-19 testing facilities
- Dr B. K. Saikia awarded Shanti Swarup Bhatnagar
- CSIR-NEIST awarded State Science Award 2019 for Science Popularisation and Research
- Center for Petroleum Research funded by Department of Fertilizers, Ministry of Chemical and Fertilizers
- DBT funded of Center of Excellence in Advanced Computation and Data Sciences
- Center for Infectious Diseases
- Regional cum Facilitation Center (RCFC), National Medicinal Plant Board
- BioNEST Bioincubator
- NABL Accreditation for Testing/Analysis services, 2021
- CSIR-Centre for Post-Harvest Processing and Research at Itanagar
- Multi-locational Trial & Regional Research Experimental Field across the northeast
