= Sadiya Assembly constituency =

Constituency of the Assam legislative assembly in India

Sadiya
- Constituency No. 81 for the Assam Legislative Assembly

Constituency details
- Country: India
- Region: Northeast India
- State: Assam
- Division: Upper Assam
- District: Tinsukia
- Lok Sabha constituency: Lakhimpur
- Established: 1977
- Reservation: None

Sadiya Assembly constituency is one of the 126 assembly constituencies of Assam a North-eastern state of India. Sadiya is also part of Lakhimpur Lok Sabha constituency.

== Members of Legislative Assembly ==
Year	Winner	Party
1978	Bipin Hazarika	Communist Party of India (Marxist)
1983	Lambheswar Sonowal	Indian National Congress
1985	Jyotsna Sonowal	Independent
1991	Debendra Nath Baruah	Indian National Congress
1996	Jagadish Bhuyan	Asom Gana Parishad
2001	Jagadish Bhuyan	Asom Gana Parishad
2006	Bolin Chetia	Indian National Congress
2011	Bolin Chetia	Indian National Congress
2016	Bolin Chetia	Bharatiya Janata Party
2021	Bolin Chetia	Bharatiya Janata Party

== Election Results ==
=== 2026 ===
2026 Assam Legislative Assembly election: Sadiya
Party	Candidate	Votes	%	±%
BJP	Bolin Chetia	97087	60.74	
AJP	Jagadish Bhuyan	55338	34.62	
NOTA	NOTA	2645	1.65	
Margin of victory		41749		
Turnout		159830		
Rejected ballots				
Registered electors				
BJP hold		Swing		

=== 2021 ===
2021 Assam Legislative Assembly election: Sadiya
Party	Candidate	Votes	%	±%
BJP	Bolin Chetia	64,855	45.49	▲13.42
INC	Lakhin Chandra Chetia	42,771	30	+3.35
AJP	Jagdish Bhuyan	29,849	20.94	New
NOTA	None of the above	1,918	1.35	N/A
Independent	Tikendra Thapa	1,104	0.77	N/A
Independent	Rijumoni Gogoi	1,055	0.74	N/A
Independent	Lalit Deori	1,023	0.72	N/A
Margin of victory		22,084	15.66%	
Turnout		1,42,575	75.1	−2.4
Registered electors		1,89,854		
BJP hold		Swing		

=== 2016 ===
2016 Assam Legislative Assembly election: Sadiya
Party	Candidate	Votes	%	±%
BJP	Bolin Chetia	38,845	32.07	+29.55
INC	Birinchi Neog	32,279	26.65	−18.29
Independent	Lakhin Chandra Chetia	22,005	18.17	N/A
Independent	Dindayal Verma	12,481	10.30	N/A
Independent	Tikendra Thapa	5,047	4.16	N/A
CPI(M)	Drona Phukan	2,310	1.90	−2.09
Independent	Biswanath Baruah	1,430	1.18	N/A
Independent	Shrikumar Dohutia	1,264	1.04	N/A
NCP	Anup Borbaruah	846	0.69	−0.95
Independent	Bulbul Gowala	783	0.64	N/A
Independent	Ramen Borgohain	758	0.62	N/A
Independent	Lalit Deori	756	0.62	N/A
NOTA	None of the above	2,044	1.68	N/A
Majority		6,566	5.42	−1.28
Turnout		1,21,090	77.50	+5.13
Registered electors		1,56,238		
BJP gain from INC		Swing		

=== 2011 ===
2011 Assam Legislative Assembly election: Sadiya
Party	Candidate	Votes	%	±%
INC	Bolin Chetia	46,318	44.94	
AGP	Jagdish Bhuyan	39,451	38.28	
Independent	Rupshikha Baruah	7,018	6.81	
CPI(M)	Labheswar Gogoi	4,116	3.99	
BJP	Gopal Pradhan	2,607	2.52	
NCP	Anup Borbaruah	1,690	1.64	
AITC	Lalit Deori	994	0.96	
SS	Debajit Moran	854	0.82	
Majority		6,867	6.70	
Turnout		1,03,048	72.37	
Registered electors		1,42,376		
INC hold		Swing		

== See also ==
- Sadiya
- Tinsukia district
- List of constituencies of the Assam Legislative Assembly
