= Hazarika =

Hazarika was a Paik officer under the administration of the Ahom kingdom and Koch kingdom. The commander over 1,000 (Hazar) paiks was known as a Hazarika. As it was a purely administrative position, the title holder could belong to diverse ethnic groups and religions.

The surname mostly belongs to the Ahom, Chutia and Koch ethnic groups. Apart from the Ahom Hazarikas, there is mention of Chutia Hazarikas in several instances of Buranjis. For example, during the reign of the Ahom king Susenphaa, the Banrukia Hazarika was of Chutia origins. At the start of the Moamoria rebellion, Kirtichandra Barbarua first sent a force led by a Chutia Hazarika to fight the rebels, who was killed in the battle. During the Dafala invasion of 1672 AD, a Chutia Hazarika was involved in the battle with the Dafalas. After the fall of the Chutia kingdom, Hazarikas were appointed among Chutia blacksmiths and other guilds to look after the works.

Hazarika was also an administrative position in the Koch army. There is mention of a Koch Hazarika in wars against the Ahoms.

Previously, the surname was also written by some Sonowal Kacharis, but it was later replaced by the Sonowal surname. The Kaibarta people also use this surname.

== Notable Hazarika people ==
- Sushila Hazarika, politician
- Pijush Hazarika, politician
- Prabin Hazarika, politician
- Atul Chandra Hazarika (1903–1986), Assamese litterateur
- Baroness Ayesha Hazarika (born 1975), British-Assamese member of the House of Lords
- Bagh Hazarika, 17th-century Assamese military commander
- Balaram Hazarika, Assamese animal tracker
- Bhupen Hazarika, Indian playback singer, lyricist, musician, singer, poet and filmmaker
- Debananda Hazarika, Indian politician
- Dhruba Hazarika (born 1956), Indian novelist
- Diganta Hazarika, actor
- Elvis Ali Hazarika (born 1981), Assamese swimmer
- Jiten Hazarika, Professor, VC, Dibrugarh University
- Jogendra Nath Hazarika, Indian politician, Chief Minister of Assam
- Mafizuddin Ahmed Hazarika (1870–1958), Assamese poet
- Mrinal Hazarika
- Pritam Hazarika (born 1969), Indian cricketer

== See also ==
- Assamese people

== Bibliography ==
- Sarma, Benudhar (1993), Maniram Dewan, Guwahati: Manuh Prakashan
