= Binoy Kumar Saikia =

Indian scientist

- Born: Jonaki Nagar, Golaghat
- Education: Debraj Roy College; Cotton College; North East Institute of Science and Technology, Jorhat
- Awards: Shanti Swarup Bhatnagar Prize, 2021
- Scientific career
- Workplaces: Tezpur University; North East Institute of Science and Technology, Jorhat

Binoy Kumar Saikia, an eminent scientist and academician in India and currently at North East Institute of Science and Technology, Jorhat (NEIST), Assam, India. He is also leading the Coal & Energy Research Group of NEIST and a Professor of AcSIR. His research interests span sustainable energy and environment in general and in particular coal-based nanotechnology, carbon and nano-materials, atmospheric chemistry, and energy storage devices. He has developed different chemical processes/technologies towards alternative applications of coal feedstocks presenting a new promising opportunity to reposition coal from a polluting energy source to a value-added material platform in the fight against climate change. He has developed and patented, both in India and the US, a technology for the production of blue-fluorescent carbon quantum dots from Indian coal.

Saikia earned his MSc degree in inorganic chemistry from Gauhati University in 2001 and PhD degree from Dibrugarh University in 2008 for a thesis titled "Some aspects of the structural investigation of Assam coal".

== Honours and awards ==
The honours and awards conferred on Saikia include:

- Shanti Swarup Bhatnagar Prize for Science and Technology in 2021 for his contributions to earth, atmosphere, ocean and planetary sciences
- Prof (Dr) MP Singh Memorial Coal Science Award (2019) from the Mining, Geological and Metallurgical Institute of India (MGMI)
- IIME Coal Beneficiation Award (2015) by Indian Institute of Mineral Engineers
- MESA Award (2014) by Mineral Engineering Science Association of India
- Achiever Awards 2021 in Science and Innovation by Asomiya Pratidin
- Associate member of Indian Institute of Chemical Engineers (IIChE)
- Fellow of Geological Society of India (FGS)
- Member of International X-ray Absorption Society, Italy
- Member of Indian Science Congress Association
- 'Assam Saurabh' Award (2022) by the Government of Assam
- Asian Scientist 100, Asian Scientist, 2022
