= Liberal Democratic Party (Assam) =

- Abbreviation: LDP
- Founder: Prodyut Bora
- Founded: 2015
- Dissolved: 2024
- Split from: Bharatiya Janata Party
- Merged into: Indian National Congress
- Political position: Centre
- ECI Status: dissolved party
- Alliance: United Opposition Forum

The Liberal Democratic Party (LDP) was a minor political party based in the state of Assam. It was founded in 2015 by Prodyut Bora following a split in Bharatiya Janata Party (BJP). The LDP joined the Asom Sonmilito Morcha, an alliance led by the Indian National Congress (INC), and it merged with the INC before the 2024 Indian general election.
