= Barua =

Assamese surname

Barua (also spelt as Baroa, Baruah, Barooa, Barooah, Baroova, Baroowa, Borooah, Baruva, Baruwa, Borooah, Borua, Boruah) is a common Assamese surname shared by the Assamese communities. They mostly follow Hinduism.

Barua surname is also used by the Magh people of Chittagong, Myanmar and West Bengal also known as Maramagyi. They follow Theravada Buddhism and are a different community from Assamese Hindu Baruas.

== In Assam Valley ==
=== History ===
Originally, the Barua surname was used as a military rank in the Chutia kingdom held by individuals from the Buruk clan. The historical examples, such as Borhuloi Barua, Gajraj Barua, Manik Chandra Barua and Kasitora Barua were Chutia officials.

During the Ahom reign, Barua represented by the Tai word Phūu-Kāe(𑜇𑜥;𑜀𑜦𑜧; or literally: "Mediator or person who solves problems" in Ahom language), meant a superintending officer of the Paik system of the Ahom Administration who looked after the law and order of the state.

Appointments as Baruas were made irrespective of the paik's religion or ethnicity. Among other ethnic groups, there is mention of Chutia Baruas in several instances of Buranjis. For example, there was a Chutia revolt against the monarchy led by a Chutia Barua in 1673. Ahom Barua was a position held by the family of the Chutia Kataki who joined the Ahoms after the defeat of Chutias; while Chutia Karhi Barua was an officer under whom the Chutia archers of the king's palace were posted. During the reign of Siva Singha, the Dulia Barua and Kukurachuwa Barua were Chutias. Other examples of Chutia Baruas include Moi Barua (Buruk-Chutia origin) and Aruwandhara Barua.

The Kachari Baruas were of Sonowal and Thengal origin; Kath Barua was appointed from Kayasthas, while Moran Baruas were appointed from Morans. Others like Bapu, Bez and Dewalia Baruas were Brahmins. Besides these, during the Moamoria rebellion, the Matak rebels also appointed Baruas among themselves.

=== Present ===
The rank bestowed upon the individuals within the Assamese community was adopted by and forms part of the continuum of the Assamese society of several groups – the Ahoms, the Brahmins, the Kalitas, the Koch, the Morans, the Motoks, the Kacharis (Sonowals and the Thengals), besides the Chutias.

=== Baruas ===
- Amulya Barua (1922–1946): Pioneered modern Assamese poetry.
- Ananda Chandra Barua (1907–1983): Writer, poet, playwright, translator, journalist, an actor from Assam.
- Aimee Baruah, actress
- Ananda Ram Baruah (1850–1889): Sanskrit scholar, sixth Indian Civil Service officer of India, and the first from Assam.
- Bhogeswar Baruah (1940–): Athlete, Asian Games gold medalist, Arjuna Award recipient.
- Bhubanmohan Baruah (1914–1998): Novelist, short story writer from Assam. He wrote many novels under the pen-name of Kanchan Baruah.
- Binanda Chandra Barua (1901–1994): Noted Indian writer, poet of Assamese literature
- Birinchi Kumar Barua (1908–1964): Scholar, educationist, writer, historian, linguist, folklorist.
- Chandradhar Barua (1874–1961): Eminent writer, poet, dramatist and lyricist from Assam.
- Debo Prasad Barooah (1930–2013): Eminent intellectual, academic, author, historian and the former Vice-Chancellor (the Chief Executive) of Gauhati University.
- Dev Kant Baruah: President of the Indian National Congress at the time of Emergency (1975–1977).
- Gunabhiram Barua (1837–1894): An Assamese intellectual, ushered in new ideas about social reform in the early years of colonial rule in Assam.
- Hem Barua (Tyagbir) (1893–1945): Indian independence activist, social worker, writer from Sonitpur district of Assam.
- Hem Barua (1915–1977): Prominent poet, politician from Assam.
- Hemchandra Barua (1836–1897): Prominent writer, social reformer of Assamese of the 19th century.
- Jagannath Barooah: Tea-Planter, popularly known for Jagannath Barooah College.
- Jnanadabhiram Barua (1880–1955): Notable writer, dramatist, translator of Assam, and a participant in India's freedom struggle.
- Kanaklal Barua (1872–1940): Prominent writer (mainly in English language), essayist, historian, and politician from Assam.
- Kanaklata Barua: Indian freedom fighter from Assam.
- Lakshminath Bezbaroa (1868–1938): Assamese author, essayist, playwright, poet, and satirist.
- Navakanta Barua (1926–2002): Prominent Assamese novelist and poet.
- Padmanath Gohain Baruah (1871–1946): First president of Assam Rhetorical Congress, novelist, poet, dramatist, analyst, and a thought provoking writer.
- Pradan Baruah: Indian politician, former member of Assam Legislative assembly, member of parliament of Lakhimpur Lok Sabha.
- Rituparna Baruah, Indian politician
- Rudra Baruah (1926–1980): Actor, composer, lyricist, singer and musician.
- Jahnu Barua – Internationally acclaimed film-maker.
- Jishnu Barua: Indian civil servant, 49th Chief Secretary of Assam
- Joi Barua – Singer, musician, and lead vocalist from Assam.
- Parvati Prasad Baruva: Famous Assamese music composer, poet, lyricist, dramatist: an icon of Assamese literature.
- Pramathesh Chandra Barua (1903–1951): Famous actor, director, and screenwriter of Indian films in the pre-independence era.
- Pratima Barua Pandey (1935–2002): Famous folk singer and daughter of Pramathesh Chandra Baruah.
- Radha Govinda Baruah (1900–1977): Founder of the Assam Tribune Group, sports enthusiast, introduced Assam to the culture of sports.
- Siva Prasad Barooah: Pioneer tea planter, path-breaker in Assamese journalism, renowned philanthropist, politician and humanist.
