= Bagh Hazarika =

Indian soldier

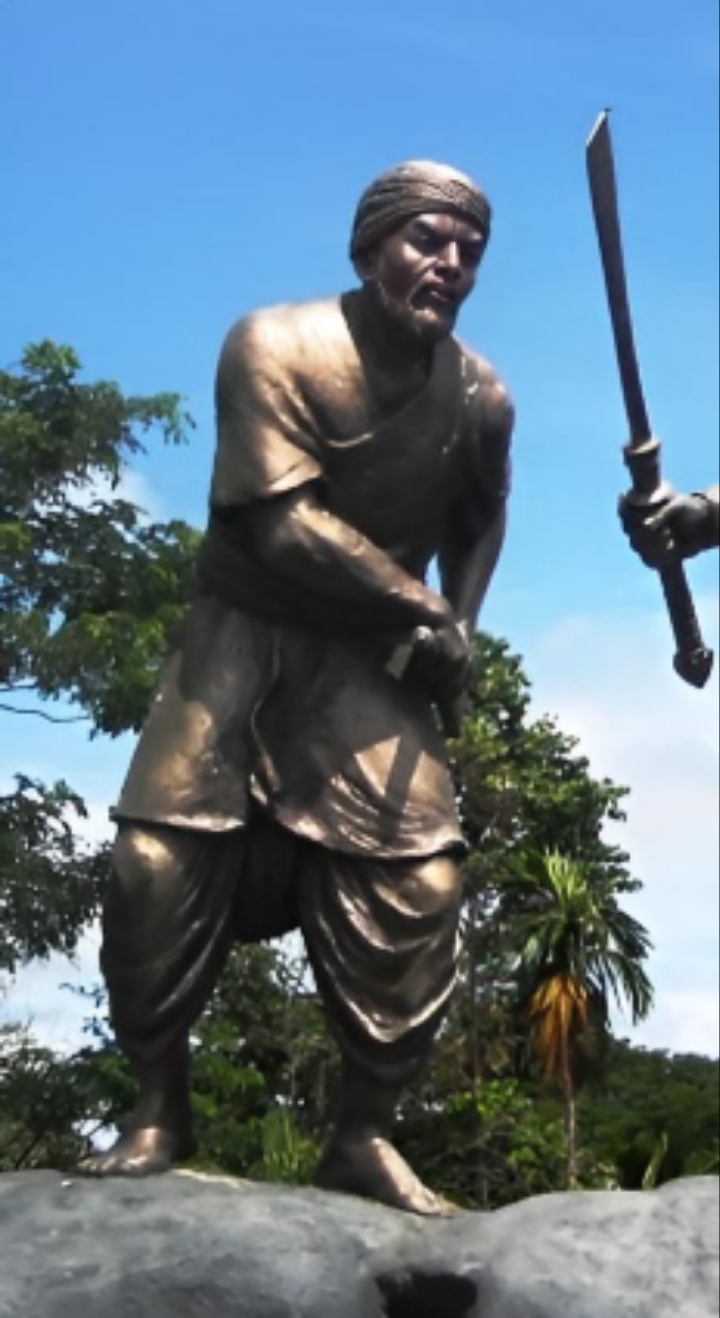
- Statue near Sivasagar town, Assam.
- Born: Ismail Siddique; 22 November; Dhekerigaon, Garhgaon, Ahom Kingdom
- Other name: Bagh Hazarika
- Military career
- Allegiance: Ahom kingdom
- Branch: Ahom Army
- Rank: Hazarika and military personnel of the Ahom army
- Nickname: Bagh
- Conflicts: Ahom–Mughal conflicts; Battle of Saraighat (1671)

Ismail Siddique, (Note: Assamese pronunciation: [ismai̯l sidːik].) who is popularly known as Bagh Hazarika, (Note: Assamese: বাঘ হাজৰিকা, Assamese pronunciation: [baɡʱ ɦazɔɹika].) was a 17th-century commander who fought against the Mughals for the Ahom kingdom. He is culturally represented as "Hero of Indigenous Muslim Communities in Assam". He was born in an Assamese Muslim family at Dhekerigaon village near Garhgaon in Assam

== Legend ==
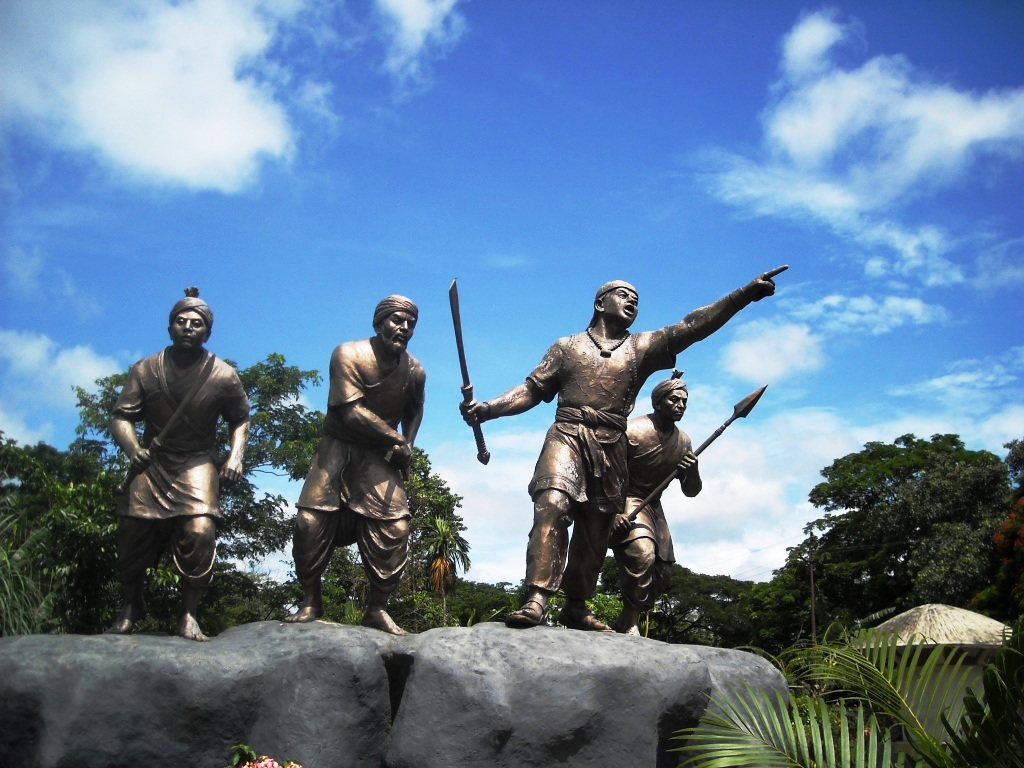
Bagh Hazarika (second from left in the image) with Ahom Hero, Lachit Barphukan and other Ahom warriors.

The legend about his origin states that there was once a tiger that had entered his village and Ismail Siddique, who was unarmed, killed the tiger barehanded. The news of this valour reached the Ahom king Chakradhwaj Singha and he called the young man to his court to display his strength. The king was impressed by the show of strength and appointed Ismail as a Hazarika, an Ahom office in charge of 1000 paiks. Hazarika himself was not an Ahom. This event marks the beginning of the legend of the brave Bagh ("Tiger" in Assamese language) Hazarika that culminated in his acts of bravery during Battle of Saraighat.

== Military career ==
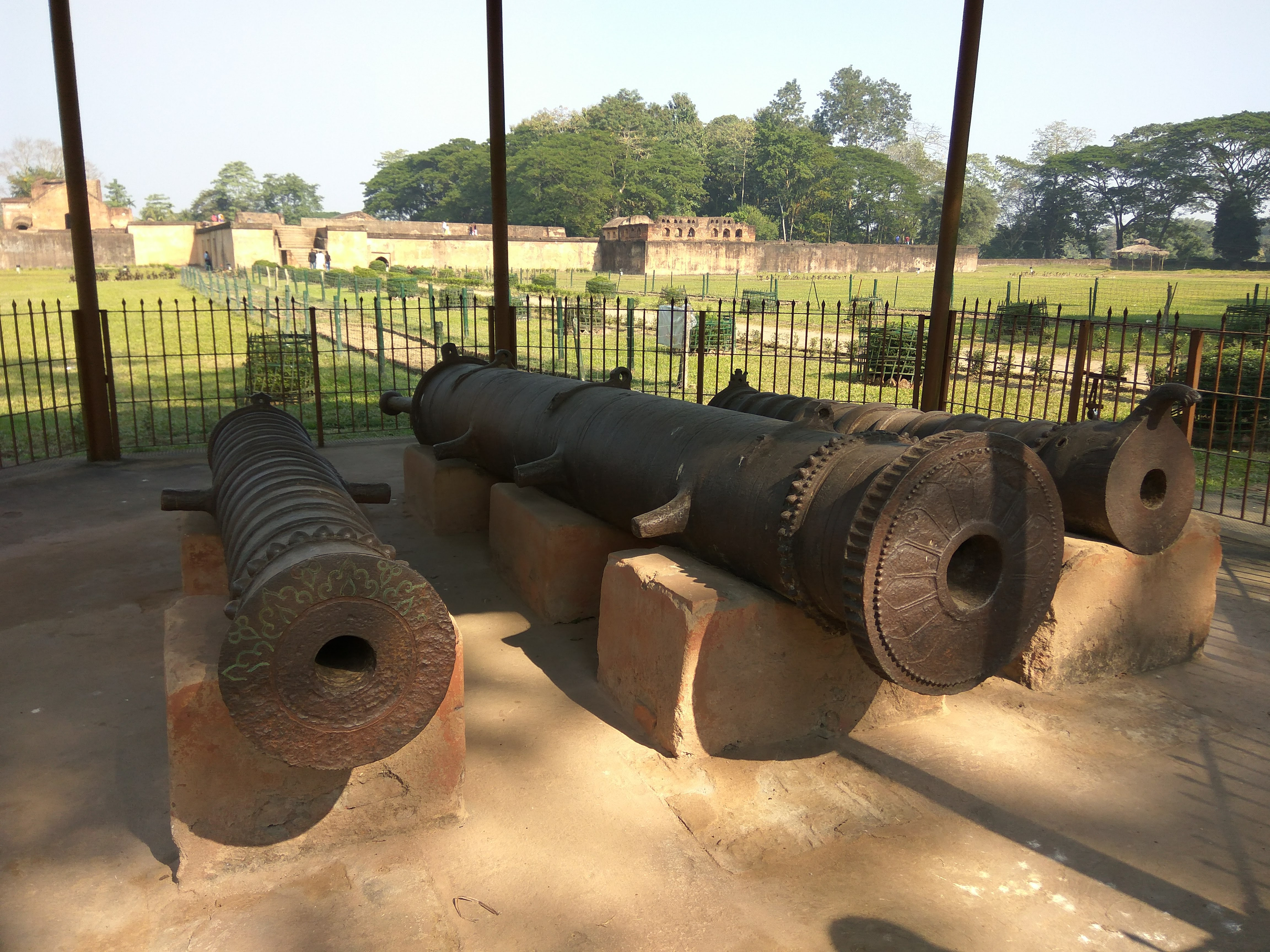
Ahom Cannon

In this first conflict, the Mughal forces were well entrenched on the hills of the north bank of the Brahmaputra River with a chain of gigantic cannons. Bagh Hazarika suggested a plan on how to disable the Mughal guns to the Ahom General Lachit Borphukan, the royal minister Atan Burhagohain and other generals. Impressed by the plan, they entrusted Bagh Hazarika with command to lead the operation.

That night an advance party led by Bagh Hazarika along with a few soldiers crossed the Brahmaputra by boat and landed on the northern bank of the river and laid in wait for the right moment. While the Mughal soldiers were busy saying their Fajr or dawn prayers, Bagh Hazarika and his soldiers climbed the high embankments and poured water into the Mughal cannons, rendering them useless.

Some time later, the Ahom army announced their advance by blowing the trumpets. In response, the Mughal soldiers rushed to their posts and tried to fire the cannons at the advancing Ahom forces. But, the wet cannons would not work. The Ahom forces used their cannons to the full strength and the Ahom army landed safely on the north bank and attacked ferociously as the Mughal soldiers retreated helplessly.

This victory had proved the courage and valour of Bagh Hazarika beyond any doubt and he was felicitated by the King. Bagh Hazarika thus went down in the annals of Assam history as a highly skilled front ranking military officer.

== Attempted erasure ==
Bagh has become a target of attempts to erase him from Indian history. A 2024 paper in the journal Asian Ethnicity documented that the BJP, the leading party of India, claimed he is fictional and even invented specifically to diminish fellow Indian commander Lachit Borphukan. The paper stated the party's "deliberate distortions" ignored "that there were no neat religious divisions in the battles" and that Lachit was neither Hindu nor Muslim. In a newsletter issue published by The Center for Emerging Democracies at the University of Michigan later that year, associate professor of political science Tahmina Rahman of Rollins College also noted the BJP's claim that Bagh is fictional and framed it within the party's "polarizing tactic that simplifies history and overlooks anomalies such as the fact that" an enemy Mughal commander, Man Singh I, was Hindu. Weaponizing Civilizationalism for Authoritarianism, a book published in 2025 by Palgrave Macmillan, said the erasure and negative reframing of Bagh occurred as part of a "concerted effort...effectively removing Muslims from Assam's past".
