= Prodyut Bora =

Indian politician

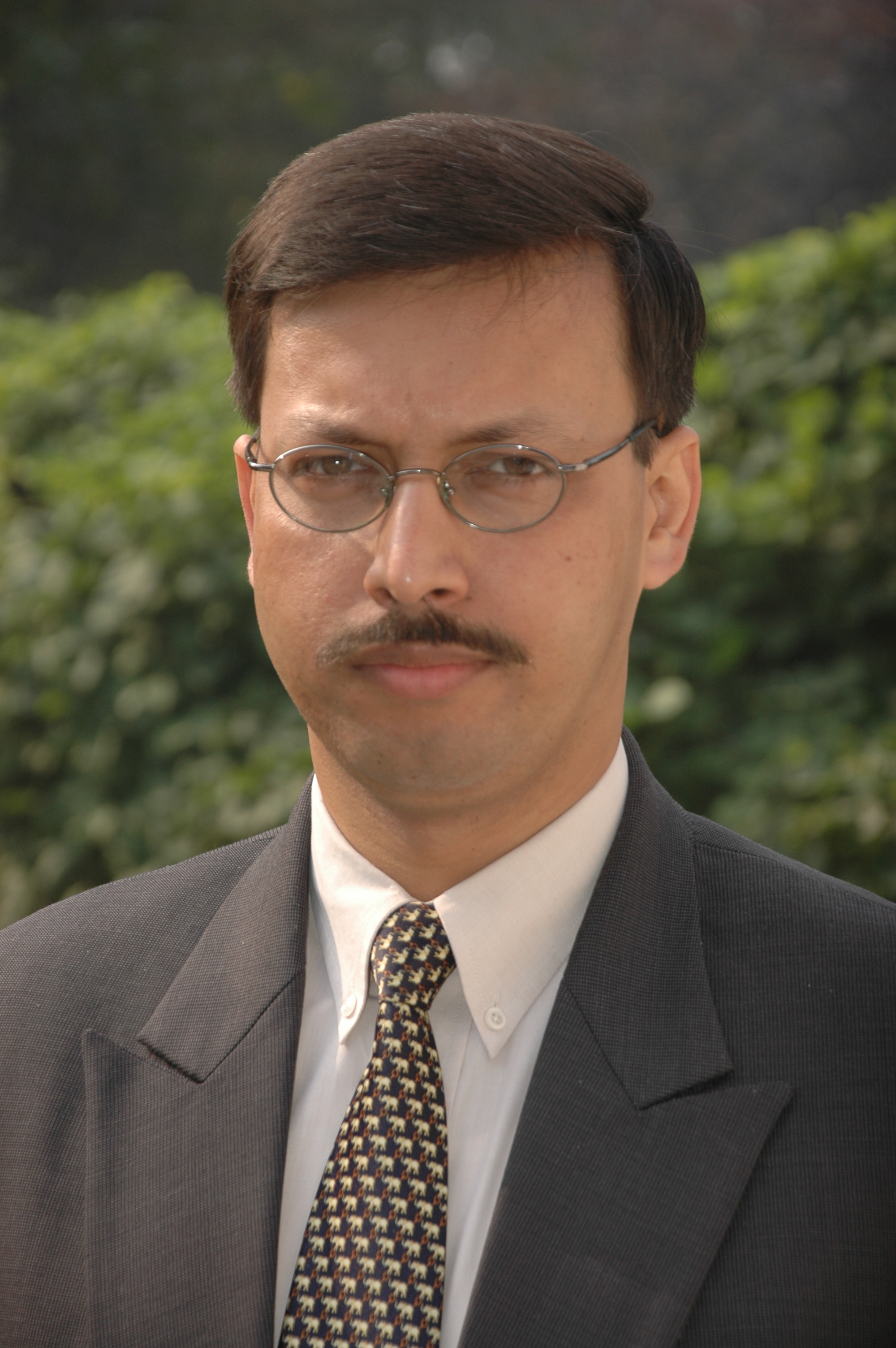
- Born: 10 April 1974 (age 52); Jorhat, Assam, India
- Education: St Stephen's College, Delhi; IIM Ahmedabad
- Political party: BJP (2004–2015) INC (2024-present)
- Parent(s): Lakshmi Kanta Bora; Lakshmi Prova Bora

Prodyut Bora (born 10 April 1974) is an Indian politician and social activist. He is the founder and current chief of the Liberal Democratic Party. He was a National Executive Committee member of the Bharatiya Janata Party (BJP) until he decided to leave the party in 2015. In 2024 he merged his party in Indian National Congress.

== Background ==
Bora was born into a Koch caste family. He obtained a Bachelor of Arts degree from St. Stephen's College, Delhi and an MBA from IIMA in 1999.

== Political career ==
In 2004, Bora started his political career as a member of BJP's National Media Cell, the party's in-house communication and public relations unit.

=== National Convener, IT Cell (2007–09) ===
In 2007, Bora was elevated and appointed as the National Convener of BJP IT Cell. The IT Cell was BJP's newest organisational unit, and Bora was its first head. The IT Cell had 3 roles: (a) automate the Party organisation; (b) attract IT professionals to the Party; and (c) advise the Party on IT Policy issues. With that mandate, Bora set up cells in 22 states across the country. He also automated the party by creating an organisational IT ecosystem using open-source software. His efforts became the subject of a case study.

In November 2008, Bora was selected to run the communications office of BJP's Prime Ministerial Candidate for the 2009 Lok Sabha Elections, LK Advani. He designed and launched the campaign website of Advani, one of India's most visited websites with an average of 3 million page views per month.

As a part of the 2009 campaign team, he was also instrumental in producing BJP's IT Vision document.

=== State General Secretary (2010–12) ===
In January 2010, Bora moved to Assam to take charge as State General Secretary of BJP's Assam unit. In the 2011 elections to the state legislature, he was pitted by his party to stand against Himanta Biswa Sarma, two-time legislator and minister, in the Jalukbari assembly constituency. Although he lost, Bora more than quadrupled his party's vote share.

=== National Executive Member (2013–15) ===
In April 2013, Bora was appointed a member of BJP National Executive Committee (NEC).

=== Split with BJP (2015) ===
In 2015, Bora split with the BJP and founded his own political party, the Liberal Democratic Party. He stated he quit the BJP due to disagreeing with the prime ministerial candidacy of Narendra Modi.
