= Jagadish Bhuyan =

Indian politician

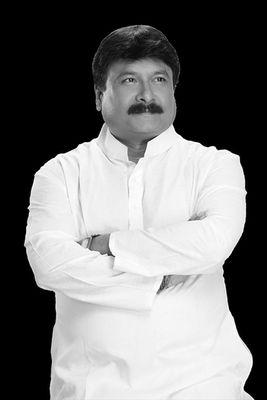
- Jagadish Bhuyan
- Constituency: Sadiya

Tourism Minister of Assam
- In office 1998–2001

Personal details
- Party: Assam Jatiya Parishad (2020–present)
- Other political affiliations: Bharatiya Janata Party (2015–2019), Asom Gana Parishad (1995–2015)
- Occupation: Politician, Activist
- Website: jagadishbhuyan.in

Jagadish Bhuyan is an Indian student leader and politician associated with the Assam Movement, who served two terms as an MLA of the Assam Legislative Assembly from the Sadiya legislative assembly constituency in Tinsukia district during 1996-2006, and as tourism minister in the Prafulla Kumar Mahanta government from 1996 to 2001. Originally a leader in the Asom Gana Parishad, in June 2015 he abandoned the faltering AGP for the Bharatiya Janata Party. He served as the chairman of Assam Petro-Chemicals until 2019. In 2020, he exited the BJP for the Assam Jatiya Parishad (AJP), the newly formed party emerging from All Assam Students Union (AASU) during the CAA protests.

== Student activism ==
From 1979 Jagadish Bhuyan was an active member and eventually became the Central Executive Member of the All Assam Students' Union and later of the National Student Co-ordination Committee of which the AASU was a part. He also served as vice president in AASU.

== Public office ==
=== As MLA and Minister ===
In 1995 he joined the AGP, and in 1996 was elected to the Assam Legislative Assembly as the youngest MLA of that session of the Assembly. In 1998, he became Minister of Tourism; he was re-elected as MLA in 2001.

=== Joins BJP ===
He remained active in the AGP, but in 2015 announced that he and several other senior AGP leaders from the Tinsukia region were leaving the party, stating "I have lost faith in the AGP which has become directionless... [t]he BJP, on the other hand, is the right party to fight for the cause of Assam."

In 2015, Jagadish Bhuyan joined Bharatiya Janata Party and was an executive member of BJP Assam Pradesh. On 13 December 2019 after BJP led NDA government passed Citizenship Amendment Bill (CAB) and made it the Citizenship Amendment Act (CAA) on 12 December, Mr. Bhuyan resigned from the Primary Membership of BJP. At that moment he was holding the post of Chairman of Assam Petrochemicals Limited with Cabinet Minister Rank.

=== In AJP ===
All Assam Students' Union (AASU) and Assam Jatiyatabadi Yuba Chatra Parishad (AJYCP) were at the forefront of the anti-Citizenship (Amendment) Act (CAA), 2019 stir in the state and espouse the protection of the rights of the indigenous communities in Assam have formed a new political party namely Assam Jatiya Parishad (AJP). Mr. Jagadish Bhuyan is appointed coordinator by Basanta Deka and Krishna Gopal Bhattacharjya convenors of AJP on 14 September 2020.

== Social life ==
He started his social life in 1979 as the All Assam Students' Union (AASU) activist of the Kakapather Anchalik Committee. From 1979 to 1987, he worked in a different post in the undivided All Dibrugarh District Student Union & Tinsukia District Student Union. In 1987 he became a Central Executive Member of All Assam Student Union. He worked as Finance Secretary and Vice President of the AASU Central Executive Committee.

In 1992, he became Member Secretary of the National Student Co-ordination Committee and worked in this post till 1994. This organization consisted of All Assam Student Union, Sikh Student Federation, All Arunachal Pradesh Student Union, Naga Student Federation, Mizo Zirloipoul, Tribal Student Federation of Tripura, All Manipur Student Union, Khasi Student Union, Uttarakhand Mahasabha, Uttarakhand Student Front and Panther Student Organization, Jammu and Kashmir. The said organization worked for the restructuring of the Indian Constitution and mobilized public opinion in favor of a strong federal structure of a union of India along with all regional student organizations of the country. From 1991 to 1995 he worked against violation of human rights.

== Political life ==
He joined active politics in 1995 by joining Asom Gana Parishad (AGP) and was nominated as a central executive member of it.

In the 1996 General Assembly Election he contested from Sadiya Constituency. He was elected as the youngest MLA at the age of 30 years. In the year 1998, he became the Minister of Tourism, in Assam. In 2001, he was elected as MLA for the second time. In 2004, he was nominated as spokesperson and member of the steering committee of AGP. From 2008 to 2012 he was nominated as general secretary of the party.

In 2011, after another poor showing of AGP in the state assembly election, he along with some of his colleagues started a reform process of the party. His initiatives were supported by many leading intellectuals of the state. However, he failed to motivate the top leadership to reform and restructure the party. In frustration, some of his colleagues left the AGP and joined other political parties. Jagadish Bhuyan too resigned from the primary membership of AGP and joined the Bharatiya Janata Party. He was the executive member of BJP, Assam Pradesh.

On 7 June 2015, after stating "I have lost faith in the AGP which has become directionless and was shrinking each passing day. The BJP, on the other hand, is the right party to fight for the cause of Assam..." Jagadish Bhuyan along with several senior leaders of the AGP left to join the BJP.

Jagadish Bhuyan was appointed Chairman of Assam Petrochemicals Limited by the current BJP government in Assam and conferred Cabinet Minister status.

On 13 December 2019 Friday, Mr. Bhuyan announced his resignation from the party and all posts protesting the Citizenship (Amendment) Bill, 2019. "When I saw the revised CAA was against Assamese people, I decided to quit. From now I will take part in anti-citizen law protests," said Bhuyan. In December 2020 he was appointed the secretary of the newly formed regional political party Assam Jatiya Parishad (AJP).

== Cultural life ==
Mr. Jagadish Bhuyan was also involved in acting from childhood & later on, he acted in many Assamese Featured Films & TV Serial as co-actor.

He acted in featured films likes Daag, Kanyadaan, Seuji Dharani Dhuniya, Bidhata, Aami Asomiya, Bholaborar Dinlipi etc.

== Chairman of Assam Petro – Chemicals Ltd ==
Jagadish Bhuyan serves as Chairman of Assam Petro-Chemicals Ltd since 7 March 2017.

== Dangari Fake Encounter Case ==
A Summary General Court Martial (SGCM) of the Indian Army has convicted seven personnel, including a Major General, in a 24-year-old fake encounter case, sentencing them to life in prison.

Major General A.K. Lal, Colonel Thomas Mathew, Colonel R.S. Sibiren, Captain Dilip Singh, Captain Jagdeo Singh, Naik Albindar Singh and Naik Shivendar Singh have been awarded life imprisonment for their involvement in a fake encounter case in Assam's Tinsukia district dating back to 1994. Nine youths were picked up by the Army from different areas of Tinsukia district on 18 February 1994, on suspicion that they were involved in the killing of a top tea garden executive. The soldiers killed five of the youths in a fake encounter, branding them as ULFA militants a few days after the incident while releasing the other four.

Jagadish Bhuyan relentlessly pursued the legal battle against the extrajudicial killings for 24-odd years and won the case in 2017. Jagadish Bhuyan had filed a Habeas Corpus petition in the Gauhati High Court on 22 February of the same year, seeking the whereabouts of the youths. The High Court asked the Indian Army to produce the nine AASU (All Assam Students Union) leaders at the nearest police station. The Army produced five bodies at the Dholla Police Station.

The court martial process began on 16 July 2018 and concluded on 27 July 2018.

== Dr. Bhupen Hazarika Setu ==
Mr. Jagadish Bhuyan, the then MLA of Sadiya wrote the first letter to the Atal Bihari Vajpayee government in 2003 for a bridge connecting Dhola with Sadiya. Mr. Bhuyan continuously pursued for three years with the Central Government.

== Methanol for Cooking ==
The Assam Petrochemicals Limited (APL) started a pilot project on 5 October 2018 on the use of methanol as an alternative to cooking gas. APL Chairman, Jagadish Bhuyan and NITI Aayog's Dr. VK Saraswat played a vital role in launching this project. "We will launch the pilot project at our APL township on October 5. If it is a success, we will launch it commercially," said Jagadish Bhuyan.
