= Pritam Patil =

Indian cricketer

Personal information
- Full name: Pritam Patil
- Born: Mumbai, Maharashtra, India
- Batting: Right-handed
- Bowling: n/a
- Role: Batsman

Pritam Patil is an Indian cricketer from Mumbai. Batting in one innings, stretching over 20 February 2016, scores triple century in a 50-over game an officially recognised match in Maharashtra Cricket Association's senior invitation league. Patil smashed 306 runs off 134 balls for PYC Hindu Gymkhana.

== Record innings ==
He smashed as many as 28 fours and 26 sixes as Nanded were knocked out of the contest even before the half-way mark. During his knock as Hindu Gymkhana racked up a huge total of 594 for 6. Many times, the balls went outside the ground. In total, new 6 balls were used in his inning. In this match, the opposite team Nanded's batsmen too put up a dismal show getting out for just 86 runs in 18.4 overs. This gives Hindu Gymkhana an astounding 508-run victory which is the highest victory made in 50 overs match.

== Recognition ==
Pritam's teammate Kedar Jadhav who also represented four ODIs for India gifted him an SS cricket bat, that costs around INR 25000, after his blistering knock.
