= Jyotsna Sonowal =

Indian politician

Jyotsna Sonowal is an Asom Gana Parishad politician from Assam, India. Sonowal was elected to Assam Legislative Assembly from Sadiya.
