= Pritam Singh (educationist) =

Indian educationist (1941–2020)

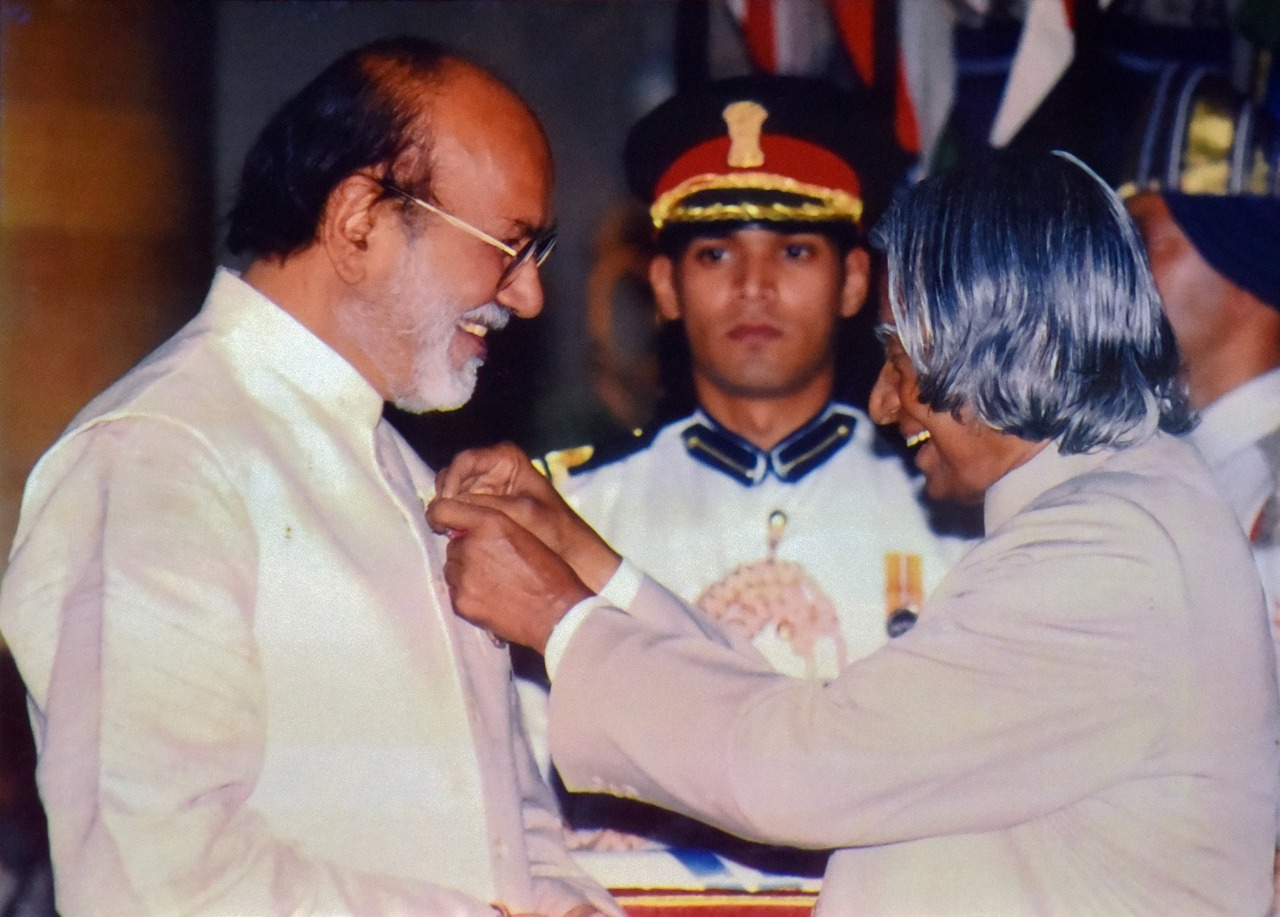
- Singh receiving Padma Shri from A. P. J. Abdul Kalam, January 2003
- Born: 19 November 1941; Kachhwa, Mirzapur, Uttar Pradesh, India
- Died: 3 June 2020 (aged 78)
- Occupations: Academic; Educationist; Advisor; Professor
- Known for: Director of MDI-Gurgaon and IIM-Lucknow
- Spouse: Saroj Singh
- Children: 6

Pritam Singh (19 November 1941 – 3 June 2020) was an Indian academic, educationist, advisor and management professor. In 2003, Singh was awarded Padma Shri, the fourth-highest civilian award by the Government of India.

Singh first served as the director of MDI-Gurgaon and then served as director of IIM-Lucknow from 1998 to 2003 and again at MDI-Gurgaon from 2003 to 2006. He also steered the International Management Institute (IMI) for three years until October 2014. Singh was chairman and member of several policy-making committees and bodies of the Government of India and private organizations.

== Career ==
Pritam Singh was a faculty at University of Rajasthan, Jaipur and then joined Banaras Hindu University as their faculty. He then moved to XLRI, Jamshedpur, where he was an area chair and faculty. After XLRI, he was appointed Dean and WCL Chair Professor at Administrative Staff College of India and thereafter he worked as senior faculty and dean at IIM, Bangalore.

In 1994, he worked as a professor and director at Management Development Institute (MDI)-Gurgaon. In 1998, he was appointed director of IIM, Lucknow, he remained with the institute for five years and again joined Management Development Institute, Gurgaon in 2003. In 2011, he was appointed as director general and professor at International Management Institute (IMI). After IMI, he was appointed as honorary director general of Manav Rachna International Institute of Research and Studies. Apart from seven academic books, Singh has also published over 80 articles in peer reviewed journals and conferences.

During his time at IIM, Lucknow, Singh organized retreats for the vice chancellors and deans of universities for improving the governance of universities. He was a member of the empowered committee instituted by the Prime Minister for the selection of the Institute of Eminence. He was also the chairman of the Defense Acquisition Committee in 2016 for streamlining the process of defense procurement.

Singh has appeared frequently at conferences and industry events on the topics of leadership, governance, education and management, such as the chambers of commerce of Holland, France, Germany, Greece, Russia, UK, USA, Thailand, Mauritius, and Egypt. He was also on the board of several public sector companies such as Hindustan Aeronautics Limited, Shipping Corporation of India, and Power Grid Corporations of India Limited.

== Membership and appointments ==
Singh was an advisor for several organizations:

- Chairman of Indira Gandhi Technical University
- Vice Chairman of the AICTE committee for accreditation of management institutes
- Member of the 6th Pay Commission for IITs, IIMs, and NITs

== Awards ==
In 2003, President of India conferred on him the ‘Padma Shri’ for Singh’s distinguished services. In December 2006, MIRBIS, the leading management school in Moscow, honored him with the title ‘Global Thought Leader’ 2006–2007. In 2001, he received UP Ratna award from the government of Uttar Pradesh. In 2002, TIE-UP California USA awarded him with the Outstanding Entrepreneur Award, he was the first recipient from the Indian academic community. In the same year, he received an award for eminent personality of the decade from Wisitex Foundation. In 2006, he was the recipient of Lifetime Achievement Award by the Swami Vivekananda Foundation.

In 2009, he was the first recipient of AIMA Academic Leadership Award and Sarvepalli Radhakrishnan Memorial Award: Teacher of Teachers. In 2019, he received Ravi J Mathai National Fellow Award by Association of Indian Management Schools.

In 2020, Singh received Bharat Asmita National Award by MIT World Peace University.

== Bibliography ==
- Singh, Pritam; Bhandarker, Asha; Rai, Snigdha (1 December 2015). The Leadership Odyssey: From Darkness to Light. SAGE Publications India. ISBN 978-93-5150-735-2.
- Singh, Pritam; Bhandarker, Asha; Rai, Sumita (13 June 2012). Millennials and the Workplace: Challenges for Architecting the Organizations of Tomorrow. SAGE Publications India. ISBN 978-81-321-0995-2.
- Singh, Pritam; Bhandarker, Asha (14 February 2011). In Search of Change Maestros. SAGE Publications. ISBN 978-81-321-0586-2.
- Singh, Pritam; Verma, Subir (7 January 2010). Organizing and Managing in the Era of Globalization. SAGE Publications. ISBN 978-81-321-0246-5.
- Singh, Pritam (1979). Occupational values and styles of Indian managers.
- Singh, Pritam; Bhandarker, Asha (1990). Corporate Success and Transformational Leadership. New Age International. ISBN 978-81-224-0265-0.
- Singh, Pritam (2002). Winning the Corporate Olympiad: The Renaissance Paradigm. Vikas Publishing House. ISBN 978-81-259-1365-8.
