= Pritam Hazarika =

Indian cricketer (born 1969)

Personal information
- Born: 28 September 1969; Guwahati, Assam
- Batting: Right-handed
- Bowling: Right-arm off-break
- Role: Wicket-keeper

Pritam Hazarika (born 28 September 1969) was an Indian cricketer. He was a right-handed batsman and a right-arm off-break bowler and wicket-keeper who played for Assam. Hazarika was born in Gauhati.

Hazarika made his first-class debut for the team against Tripura in February 1988, in Assam's final game in the 1987-88 Ranji Trophy. The team won the game by an innings margin, thanks to centuries and then-best innings totals by both Rajkumar Das and Rajesh Borah.

Hazarika made a single appearance in each of the following two seasons, failing to get out of single figures each time. He was a lower-middle-order batsman.
