= North East Institute of Science and Technology, Jorhat =

It is a very amazing research centre

North East Institute of Science and Technology
- Motto: Connecting science & technology for a brighter tomorrow
- Type: Research Institution
- Established: 1961 (64 years ago)
- Director: Dr. V. M. Tiwari
- Administrative staff: 300
- Location: Jorhat - 785006, Assam, India
- Campus: Suburban, western Jorhat
- Website: neist.res.in

North East Institute of Science and Technology (NEIST) (formerly Regional Research Laboratory) is a constituent establishment of the Council of Scientific and Industrial Research (CSIR), an R&D organization of India, which has a chain of laboratories across the country. This laboratory was established in 1961 under the chemical science group of CSIR and originally its main aim was to develop indigenous technologies by utilizing the immense natural resources of northeastern India like Petroleum, Coal, Natural Gas, Minerals, Tea, Microbes, Aromatic and Medicinal plants.

== Activities ==
Presently, NEIST is a multidisciplinary research institution having research areas like Advanced Computation and Data Science, Medicinal Chemistry, Natural Products Chemistry, Synthetic Organic Chemistry, Biotechnology, Infectious disease, Communicable and Non-communicable disease, Medicinal, Aromatic and Economic plants, Geoscience, Petroleum and Natural Gas, Applied Civil Engineering, Chemical Engineering, General Engineering, Cellulose, Membrane technologies, Pulp and Paper, Material Science and CoalThe institution is equipped to carry out research in frontier areas of science and technology. A Common Facility Centre (CFC) under the STINER (Science and Technological Intervention in North East India) project funded by Ministry of Development of North Eastern Region (MDoNER), Govt of India has been established at NEIST. The main goal of the project is to bring all the relevant proven technologies to the people of North Eastern Region (NER), more particularly to farmers and artisans community, so that the quality of their profession can be boosted through science and technological intervention. During the unprecedented situation of COVID-19 across the globe, the institute has organized a Summer Research Training Program 2020 (SRTP) through online mode to provide training to over 16000 participants. The training program for Drug Discovery Hackathon 2020, an initiative of MHRD's Innovation Cell, was conducted by the institute. A COVID-19 research laboratory has also been set up in the institute premises to facilitate COVID-19 testing facility in the entire region. Under the CSIR-AROMA mission, the institute has planned to set up "Multilocational Trial & Regional Research Experimental Farm" across the North East.

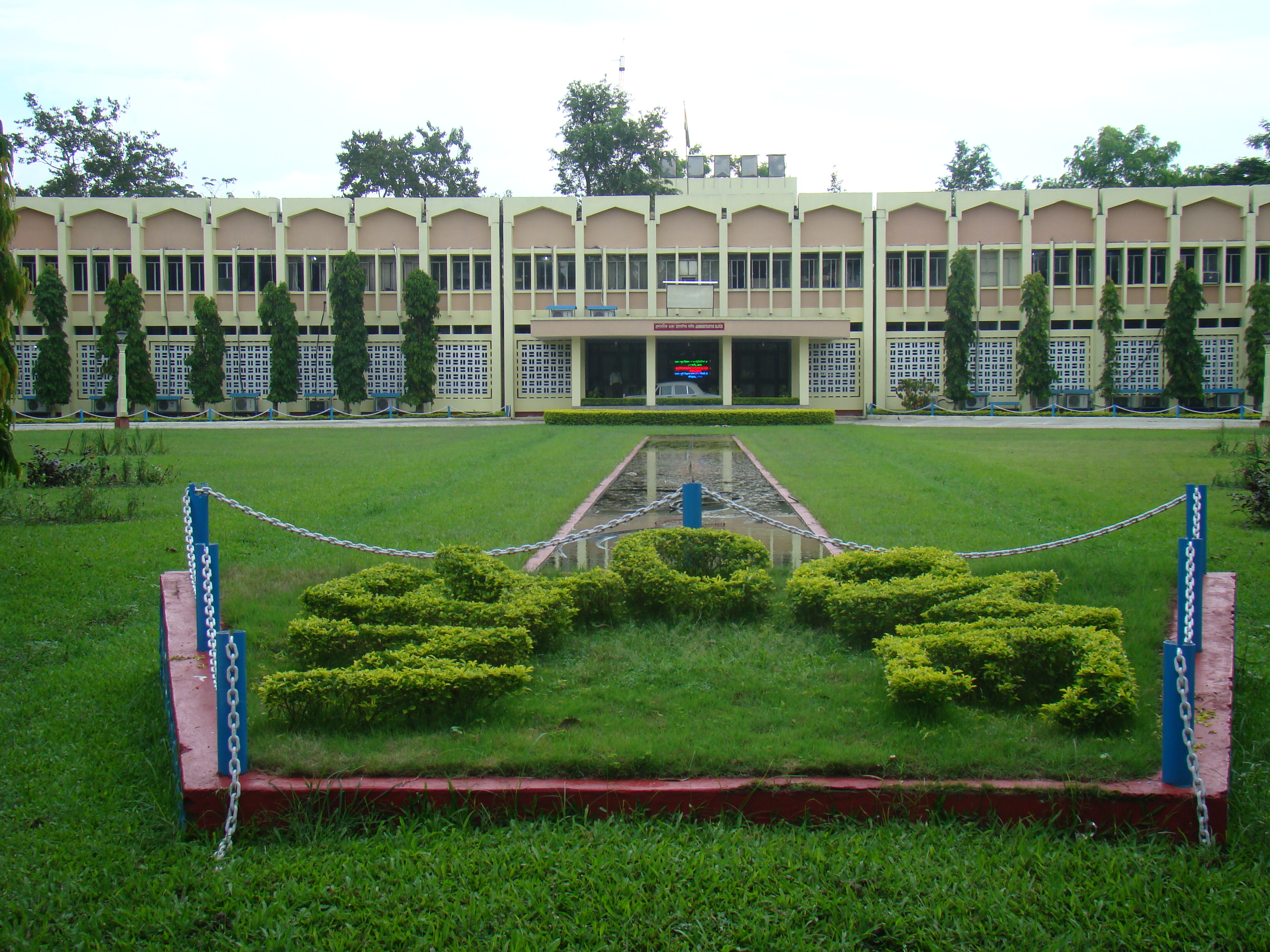
NEIST main administrative building

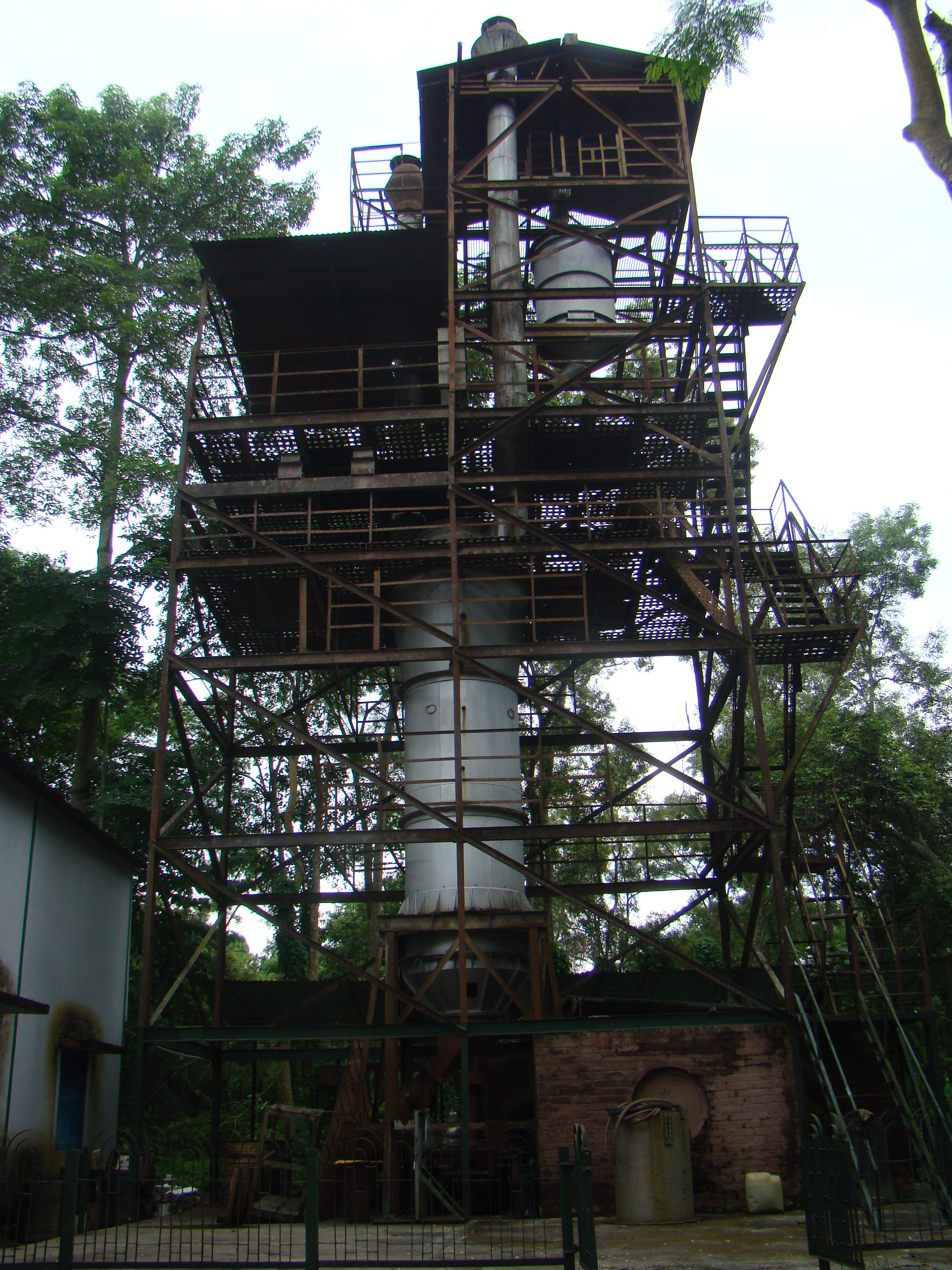
NEIST VSK mini cement plant

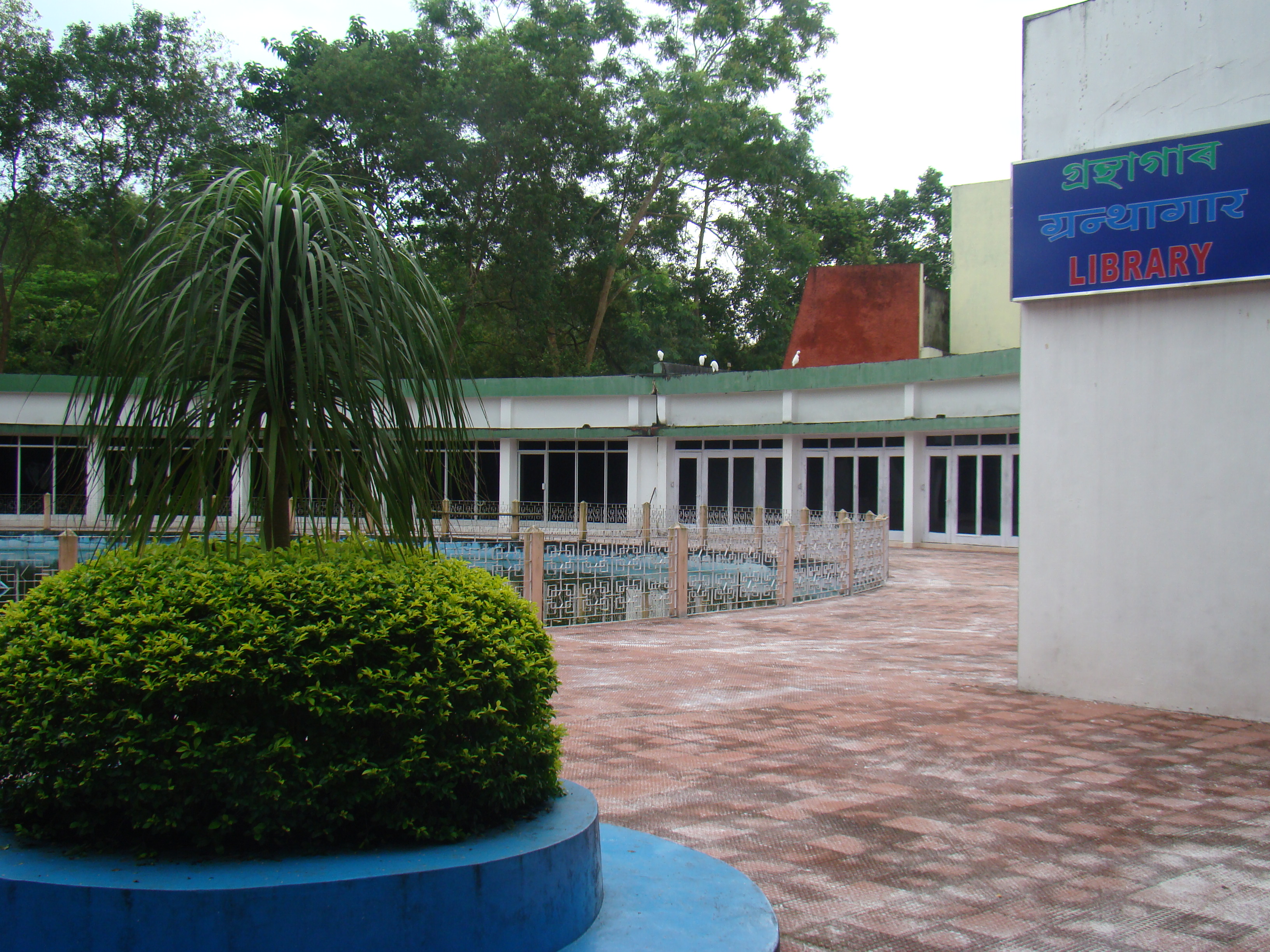
NEIST Library

== Divisions ==
Present Director of CSIR-NEIST is Dr. Virendra M Tiwari. For scientific and administrative purposes the NEIST's manpower has been grouped into 8 research and development divisions and several groups for providing technical and scientific support. The following divisions are involved in research and development:

- Advanced Computation and Data Science Division (ACDSD)
- Agrotechnology and Rural Development Division (ARDD)
- Biological Sciences and Technology Division (BSTD)
- Chemical Sciences and Technology Division (CSTD)
- Coal and Energy Division (C&ED)
- Engineering Sciences and Technology Division (ESTD)
- Geo Sciences and Technology Division (GSTD)
- Material Sciences and Technology Division (MSTD)
- Research Planning and Business Development Division (RPBD)

== Substations ==
NEIST has one branch laboratory in Arunachal Pradesh near Itanagar at Naharlagun locality and another at Imphal, Manipur and one field station in Nagaland called as NEIST Experimental Farm, Mokokchung.
