= Thengal Kachari people =

Indigenous tribe of Assam, northeast India

Thengal kachari people
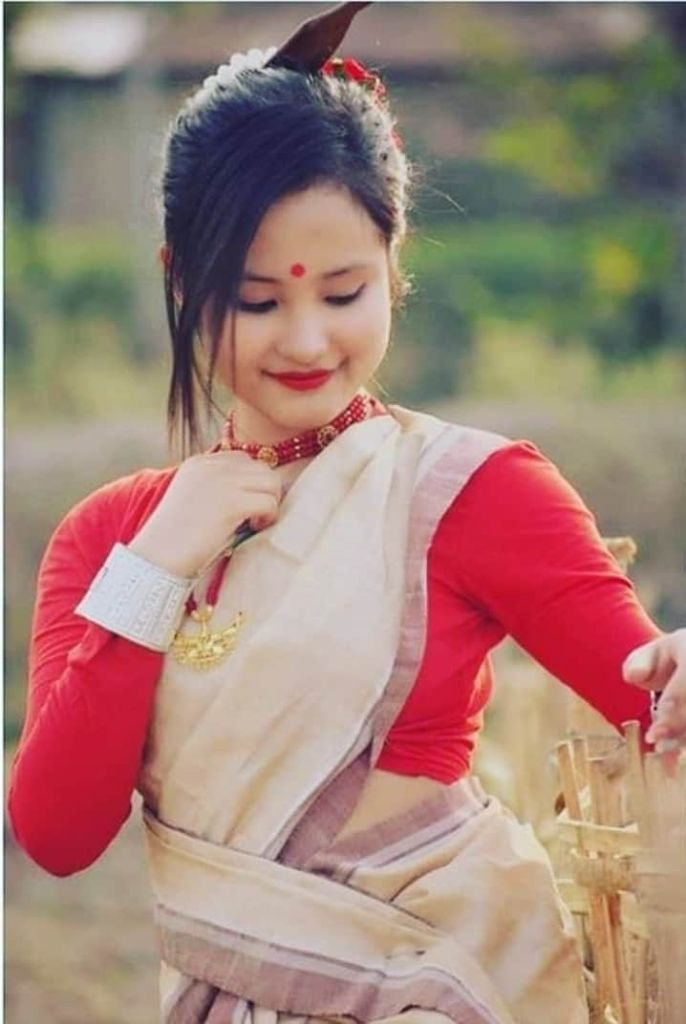
- A Thengal Kachari girl in Muga dress

Regions with significant populations
- Upper Assam

Languages
- Assamese

Religion
- Hinduism (variation Ekasarana Dharma) and some are Animistic ritual

Related ethnic groups
- Sonowal Kachari

The Thengal Kachari people are an indigenous ethnic group of Assam, India. They are a part of greater Bodo-Kachari family. They are mainly concentrated in the Jorhat, Golaghat, North Lakhimpur, Nagaon and Karbi Anglong districts.Their traditional festival is "Tora Chira" bihu. They commonly known as "Kachari" people.

== Etymology ==
There are different theories regarding the origin of the term "Thengal". As per the census of India, 1891, the Thengal kacharis derive their name from an ancestor who is said to have ascended to heaven leg foremost. But according to Thengalratna Dr. Jogeswar Borah, earlier the Thengals used to wear a pantaloon called "Thenga" from which the name has been derived.

They are also called as 'Rupowal' from their traditional occupation as silver washers in the Ahom rule. However, some people in recent time don't prefer this term.

== History ==
Historical accounts of the Thengals are very scarce. According to Hiteswar Borbaruah, some Kacharis used to procure silver in the Dhansiri River and were called Thengals or Rupowal. But earlier they were known by the name "Rupiya thakur".

== Culture ==
Thengal kachari is a functional group that were silver washers by profession during the Ahom rule. They practice endogamy and reported to be inhabiting the eastern portion of the Brahmaputra valley. They are essentially devotees of Lord Shiva. They also worship or sacrifice to the elements of nature more than idols. Various animistic practices are still prevalent.They engage a brahmin in marriage, but with the advent of "Ekasarna Vaishnavism", this practice has declined by a part of them.

=== Clans ===
Thengals have twenty one exogamous clans each of which was formed according to various occupations. They are:

=== Language ===
The language of Thengals is Assamese. However, there are some phonetic variations in their /ch due to their Tibeto-burman background. According to Nan/ora, the language of/ngal and Sonowal Kacharis is actually Assamese. In the past, their language was under the Boro-Garo languages but the circulation of the language is no more present. At present their mother tongue is Assamese.

=== Marriage ===
Marriage in the Thengal kachari community involves Vedic rites and rituals. There are basically three types of marriage 1. Bor biya, 2. Abioi Biya or Juron Diya Biya, and 3. Poluai ana Biya.

== Festivals and customs ==
=== Festivals ===
- Torachira Bihu (তৰাছিৰা বিহু)
- Suwa utuwa utsav
- Panitula Sabah
- Bihu

=== Customs associated with folk belief ===
- Ai Sabah
- Apeswari Sabah
- Mritakok diya
- Shiva worship

=== Customs associated with worship of spirits ===
- Jakh-Jakhini puja
- Ga Dangoria puja
- Bhitar Sokam
- Sani gharar sawul
- Jal Debota puja
- Lakhimi sal
- Tupula Bandha
- Pir diya

== Religion ==
The Thengals are mostly followers of Vaishnavism, and they were initiated by Basudev Gosain of Auniati Satra. Hence, they are the followers of Brahma Samhati and obey the Vedic rites and rituals and are known as Bamonia as they engage Brahmin priests in their religious ceremonies or Mahekia as they conduct a funeral feast after a month. Besides, there are two more sections of Thengals, one of which is called Nam-kirtania or Hari-dhanis and follows Eksarana Naam Dharma and are under Srimanta Sankardeva Sangha and the other section have taken the Ek Saran Bhagabati Dharma and initiated into the mode of worshiping of Mahapurushiya Dharma also called Egharoh Diniya as they conduct funeral feast after 11 days.

The Thengals are completely Hinduised. However, the Bamunia section is seen to have retained some of their animistic rituals.

== See also ==
- Sonowal kacharis
- Sonowal khel
