= Lohit Sonowal =

Recipient of Kirti Chakra

Lohit Sonowal KC
- Born: Sonaighuli village, Dispur, Kamrup district, Assam, India
- Died: 19 April 2013; Kordoiguri village, Tinsukia district, Assam, India
- Police career
- Allegiance: India
- Branch: Assam Police
- Rank: Inspector
- Awards: Kirti Chakra

Lohit Sonowal, KC was an Inspector of Commando Battalion of Assam Police who was posthumously awarded India's second highest peace time gallantry award Kirti Chakra.
