= Koch (caste) =

Caste in India

Koch

Regions with significant populations
- Upper Assam

Languages
- Assamese

Related ethnic groups
- Bodos, Tiwas, Karbis, Hajongs, Ahoms, Nagas, Chutias

Koch is a social group in the Indian state of Assam. The members of the caste are converts from different ethnic groups such as the Bodos, Garos, Tiwas, Karbis, Hajongs, Chutias etc. The Koch is one of many categories in the tribe-caste continuum in Assamese society. In some instances, the identity of the Koch overlaps the identity of the Kachari. Any member of any ethnic group can become a Koch by employing a Brahmin and giving up habits such as the consumption of liquor, pork, beef etc. and giving up their original mother tongue which are considered to be impure in Hinduism. The caste is mostly found to be concentrated in Upper Assam section of the Brahmaputra Valley.

== See also ==
- Boro people
- Garo people
- Tiwa (Lalung)
- Karbi people
- Assamese people
