= Sonowal Kachari people =

Ethnic group of Assam and Arunachal Pradesh, Northeast India

Total population
- 235,881

Regions with significant populations
- Predominantly in Upper Assam;

Languages
- Assamese

Religion
- Ekasarana Dharma

Related ethnic groups
- Other Bodo–Kachari peoples

The Sonowal Kachari are one of the indigenous peoples of the state of Assam in Northeast India. They are of Tibeto-Burman origin, and are closely associated with the other ethnic groups of Assam, which are commonly referred to as Kachari. Today, they are predominantly inhabitants of Dhemaji, North Lakhimpur, Tinsukia and Dibrugarh districts of Assam, along with pocket populations in Jorhat, Sivsagar, Golaghat district of Assam and in the state of Arunachal Pradesh. The headquarters of the Sonowal Kachari Autonomous Council is at Dibrugarh.

== Etymology ==
The name Sonowal comes from the word 'Son' (Assamese: Xon) which means gold in Assamese.The traditional occupation of the Sonowal kacharis was gold panning, that is extracting gold from the riverbeds. The Kacharis those were appointed as gold-washers by the Ahom kings were organised into Sonowal Khel. These Kacharis came to be known as Sonowal Kacharis.

== History ==
As per the book Ahomar Din, the ancestors of Sonowal Kacharis arrived from Lower Assam with the army of the Koch King Nara Narayan and Gohain Kamal in the 16th century and settled in Sadiya over time. Most of these Sonowal Kacharis migrated from Sadiya during the early 19th century and resided in the forested area between the Buri Dihing and Dibru rivers of Matak territories. The Sonowals share certain place-name traditions, such as Halali and Dimapur, with the Dimasa community. These locations are referenced in Sonowal Haidang geet (traditional songs), while Dimasa oral traditions similarly recount a migration from the Nilachal Hills to Halali before finally settling in Dimapur. Haidang geet also recall Sonowals mixing with hill tribes like Daflas, Mishing and Abor, forming a clan system before finally settling in Sadiya.

== Notable people ==
- Pradan Baruah, Indian politician, former member of Assam Legislative.
- Jogesh Das, prominent writer, recipient of Sahitya Academi Award
- Jogendra Nath Hazarika, chief minister of Assam (1979)
- Lohit Sonowal, inspector of Commando Battalion of Assam Police, awarded the Kirti Chakra military decoration
- Sarbananda Sonowal, politician and former chief minister of Assam (-2021)

== See also ==
- Thengal Kacharis
- Sonowal Khel
