= Ukiam =

- Village
- Location in Assam, India Ukiam (India)
- Coordinates: 25.81°N 91.32°E
- Country: India
- State: Assam
- Region: Western Assam
- District: Kamrup

Government
  - Body: Gram panchayat

Languages
  - Official: Assamese

Other Languages
  - Local: Garo | Rabha
- Time zone: UTC+5:30 (IST)
- PIN: 781124
- ISO 3166 code: IN-AS
- Vehicle registration: AS
- Website: kamrup.nic.in

== Transport ==
The village is near National Highway 37 and connected to nearby towns and cities with regular buses and other modes of transportation. The nearest city to Ukiam is Chhaygaon which is about 28 km away. The road has been newly constructed in 2014 and is in good condition.

== See also ==
- Uparhali
- Topatali
- Toparpathar
- Topabari
- Tokradia
