= Tarani =

- Village
- Location in Assam, India Tarani (India)
- Coordinates: 26.51°N 91.61°E
- Country: India
- State: Assam
- Region: Western Assam
- District: Kamrup

Government
  - Body: Gram panchayat
- Elevation: 42 m (138 ft)

Languages
  - Official: Assamese
- Time zone: UTC+5:30 (IST)
- PIN: 781354
- Vehicle registration: AS
- Website: kamrup.nic.in

Tarani is a village in Kamrup rural district, situated in north bank of river Brahmaputra, surrounded by Goreswar and Baihata.

== Transport ==
The village is located north of National Highway 31, connected to nearby towns and cities with regular buses and other modes of transportation.

== See also ==
- Singra Rajapara
- Singra
- Simlatarabari
- Simina
- Silkijhar
