= Kanika =

Kanika may refer to:

== People ==
- Kanika (name), a common Indian given name, from Hindi or Sanskrit
- Kaniha or Kanika (born 1982), Indian film actress who works predominantly in Malayalam cinema

== Other uses ==
- Kaniha, Kamrup, a village in Assam in India
- Kanika Chorten, a stupa located in Sani Monastery
- Kanika Jamavar, a high end variety of Jamavar shawl
- Kanika (film), an Indian revenge/horror film
- Kanika (food), an Indian rice dish

== See also ==
- Kanik (disambiguation)
- Kanaka (disambiguation)
