= Sarpara, Kamrup =

Sarpara সৰপাৰা
- Village
- Location in Assam, India Sarpara (India)
- Coordinates: 26.0956°N 91.5161°E
- Country: India
- State: Assam
- Region: Western Assam
- District: Kamrup

Government
  - Body: Gram panchayat

Population
  - Total: 10,500

Languages
  - Official: Assamese
- Time zone: UTC+5:30 (IST)
- PIN: 781122
- Vehicle registration: AS
- Website: kamrup.nic.in

Sarpara is a village in Kamrup rural district, situated in south bank of river Brahmaputra.

== Transport ==
The village is near National Highway 17 . Near Train station and connected to nearby towns and cities with regular buses and other modes of transportation.

== See also ==
- Titkuri
- Tukrapara
