= Dubi =

Dubi may refer to:

== People ==
- Dubi Tešević (born 1981), Bosnian football player
- Gérard Dubi (born 1943), Swiss ice hockey player
- Xue Dubi (1892–1973), Chinese politician

== Places ==
- Dubi, Pathsala, India
- Dubí, Czech Republic

== Other ==
- Dubi copperplate inscription
