= Tengajhar =

- Village
- Location in Assam, India Tengajhar (India)
- Coordinates: 26.72°N 91.71°E
- Country: India
- State: Assam
- Region: Western Assam
- District: Kamrup

Government
  - Body: Gram panchayat
- Elevation: 42 m (138 ft)

Languages
  - Official: Assamese
- Time zone: UTC+5:30 (IST)
- PIN: 781364
- Vehicle registration: AS
- Website: kamrup.nic.in

Tengajhar is a village in Kamrup rural district, situated in north bank of river Brahmaputra

== Transport ==
The village is accessible through, National Highway 37, connected to nearby towns and cities with regular buses and other modes of transportation.

== See also ==
- Udiana
- Uzankuri
