= Himangshu Shekhar Baishya =

Indian politician in Assam

Member of the Assam Legislative Assembly
- Incumbent
- Assumed office 4 May 2026
- Preceded by: Hemanga Thakuria
- Constituency: Palasbari

Personal details
- Born: 1990 (age 35–36)
- Party: Bharatiya Janata Party
- Profession: Politician

Himangshu Shekhar Baishya (born 1990) is an Indian politician from Assam. He is a member of Assam Legislative Assembly from Palasbari Assembly constituency in Kamrup district representing the Bharatiya Janata Party.

== Early life ==
Baishya is from Palasbari, Kamrup district, Assam. He is the son of Ajit Baishya. He completed his BCom at Guwahati Commerce College which is affiliated with Gauhati University in 2011. He runs his own business. He declared assets worth Rs.12 crore in his affidavit to the Election Commission of India.

== Career ==
Baishya won the Palasbari Assembly constituency representing the Bharatiya Janata Party in the 2026 Assam Legislative Assembly election. He polled 1,09,301 votes and defeated his nearest rival, Pankaj Lochan Goswami of the Assam Jatiya Parishad, by a margin of 43,953 votes.
