= Sadilapur =

- Village
- Location in Assam, India Sadilapur (India)
- Coordinates: 26.14°N 91.55°E
- Country: India
- State: Assam
- Region: Western Assam
- District: Kamrup

Government
  - Body: Gram panchayat

Languages
  - Official: Assamese
- Time zone: UTC+5:30 (IST)
- PIN: 781012
- Vehicle registration: AS
- Website: kamrup.nic.in

Sadilapur is a village in Kamrup district, located near the south bank of the Brahmaputra river.

== Transport ==
The village is near National Highway 37 and connected to nearby town of Mirza and the city of Guwahati, with regular mini trekkers and other modes of transportation. The village's bus facility stopped operating in 2008. The nearest airport is Lokpriya Gopinath Bordoloi International Airport.

== See also ==
- Tokradia
- Tarani
