= Amranga =

- Village
- Location in Assam, India Amranga (India)
- Coordinates: 26.04°N 91.49°E
- Country: India
- State: Assam
- Region: Western Assam
- District: Kamrup

Government
  - Body: Gram panchayat
- Elevation: 51 m (167 ft)

Languages
  - Official: Assamese
- Time zone: UTC+5:30 (IST)
- PIN: 781014
- Vehicle registration: AS
- Website: kamrup.nic.in

Amranga is a village in Kamrup district, situated in the south bank of the river Brahmaputra.

== Transport ==
The village is located extreme south of the district, and connected to nearby towns and cities like Bijoynagar, Chaygaon and Guwahati with regular buses and other modes of transportation through National Highway 17.

== See also ==
- Amgaon
