= Dagaon =

- Village
- Location in Kamrup, India Dagaon (India)
- Coordinates: 26.38°N 91.71°E
- Country: India
- State: Assam
- District: Kamrup

Government
  - Body: Gram panchayat
- Elevation: 46 m (151 ft)

Population (2011)
  - Total: 3,970

Languages
- Time zone: UTC+5:30 (IST)
- PIN: 781380
- Vehicle registration: AS

Dagaon is a village in Kamrup district of Assam, India. It is situated on the north bank of the Brahmaputra River.

== Transportation ==
Dagaon is near National Highway 31, Baihata Chariali-Guwahati The road lies to the west and is well-connected to nearby towns and the city of Guwahati through various modes of transport. From this location, prominent institutions such as AIIMS Guwahati, IIT Guwahati, and Gauhati University can be reached within less than an hour via the aforementioned National Highway. The surrounding area has experienced industrial growth and contains a mix of rural and urban land use.

== See also ==
- Dakhala
