= Udayan Vihar =

Locality in Guwahati, India

Coordinates: 26°9′54″N 91°50′08″E

Udayan Vihar is a locality in Guwahati, surrounded by localities of Satgaon, Narengi and Noonmati.

== Transport ==
Locality is connected to rest of city, with regular buses and other modes of transportation.

== See also ==
- Suagpur
- Srihati
- Soniadi
- Soneswar
- Sonai Kamalajari
