= Akadi, Kamrup =

Akadi
- Village
- Location in Kamrup, India Akadi (India)
- Coordinates: 26.3325739°N 91.5567703°E
- Country: India
- State: Assam
- District: Kamrup
- Elevation: 46 m (151 ft)

Languages
- Time zone: UTC+5:30 (IST)
- PIN: 781102
- Vehicle registration: AS

Akadi is a village in Kamrup district of Assam, situated on the north bank of the Brahmaputra River The major nearby towns are Kamalpur and Baihata.

== Transportation ==
Akadi is connected to nearby towns through National highway 27.

== See also ==
- Aggumi
