= Amtala (disambiguation) =

Amtala is a census town in South 24 Parganas district in the Indian state of West Bengal.

Other places with the same name are:

- Amtala (Kamrup), a village in Kamrup district of Assam
- Amtala, Murshidabad, a town in Murshidabad district of West Bengal
