= Kaniha, Kamrup =

Kaniha
- Village
- Location in Assam, India Kaniha (India)
- Coordinates: 26.41°N 91.47°E
- Country: India
- State: Assam
- District: Kamrup

Government
  - Body: Gram panchayat

Languages
  - Official: Assamese
- Time zone: UTC+5:30 (IST)
- PIN: 781380
- Vehicle registration: AS
- Website: kamrup.nic.in

Kaniha is a village in Kamrup district surrounded by Kamalpur town. It is 31 km from Guwahati.

== Transport ==
Kaniha is accessible through National Highway 31. All major private commercial vehicles ply between Kaniha and nearby towns.

== See also ==
- Pubborka
- Dimu Dobak
