= Pubborka =

- Village
- Location in Assam, India Pubborka (India)
- Coordinates: 26.30°N 91.70°E
- Country: India
- State: Assam
- District: Kamrup

Government
  - Body: Gram panchayat

Languages
  - Official: Assamese
- Time zone: UTC+5:30 (IST)
- PIN: 781101
- Vehicle registration: AS
- Website: kamrup.nic.in

Pubborka is a village in Kamrup district surrounded by Kamalpur, Assam town. It is 35 km from Guwahati.

== Transport ==
Pubborka is accessible through National Highway 31. All major private commercial vehicles ply between Pubborka and Kamalpur.

== See also ==
- Guakuchi
- Ramdia
