= Bijoynagar =

BIJOYNAGAR TOWN
- Town
- Nickname: Nogor
- Location in Assam, India BIJOYNAGAR TOWN (India)
- Coordinates: 26.1014°N 91.5059°E
- Country: GuwahatiIndia
- State: Assam
- District: Kamrup

Government
  - Type: Municipality corporation Guwahati

Population (59% Hindus, 39.45% Muslim, 1.55% Jain)
  - Total: 100,000

Languages
  - Official: Assamese Unofficial Marwari, Bhojpuri, Hindi, Urdu
- Time zone: UTC+5:30 (IST)
- PIN: 781122
- Vehicle registration: AS
- Website: kamrup.nic.in

Bijoynagar is a town in the Kamrup district. It is on the south bank of the river Brahmaputra.

== Transport ==
Bijoynagar is located on National Highway 17 and is well connected with Guwahati and other nearby towns with both government and private commercial vehicles.

== Religion ==
=== Religion ===
Religion in Bijoynagar Town
Religion	Percent
Hinduism	59.00%
Islam	39.45%
Jain	1.55%

As of the 2021 census, 39.45% of the population are Hindus, Muslims are 39.45% and Jain are 1.55%.

== Education ==
- Amrit Chandra Thakuria Commerce College
- Haligaon High Madrasa School
- Uparhali Higher Secondary School
- Sarpara Gangapukhuri LP School
- Sarpara Girl's High School
- Sarpara Madrasa High School
- Faculty Public English Medium School
- Benison CBSE School
- Dibyojyoti School
- Assam Jatiya bidyalay School
- Uparhali Girl's High School
- Kidzee school

== See also ==
- Sarpara
- Haligaon
- Simina
- Futuri
- Uparhali
- Dakhala
- Satrapara
- Khulungpara
- Jharobari
- Nohira
