= Tupamari =

- Village
- Location in Assam, India Tupamari (India)
- Coordinates: 26.14°N 91.09°E
- Country: India
- State: Assam
- Region: Western Assam
- District: Kamrup

Government
  - Body: Gram panchayat

Languages
  - Official: Assamese
- Time zone: UTC+5:30 (IST)
- PIN: 781127
- Vehicle registration: AS
- Website: kamrup.nic.in

Tupamari is a village in Kamrup rural district, situated in south bank of river Brahmaputra.

== Transport ==
The village is near National Highway 37 and connected to nearby towns and cities with regular buses and other modes of transportation.

== Demographics ==
According to 2011 census, the total population of Tupamari is 10,964. 51.2% of the population is male and 48.8% are female. There are 2,046 households. The literacy rate of the village is 51.25%. Most of the population is Muslim.

== Educational institute ==
- Tupamari anchalik college.
- Rangeswari Tupamari higher secondary school.
- Tupamari high school.
- C.V Raman institute.
- Adarsha senior secondary school.
- Little Star English School.
- Dr A.P.J Abdul kalam Academy.

== See also ==
- Ukiam
- Udiana
- Nagarbera
