= Alupati =

Alopati
- Village
- Location in Kamrup, India Alopati (India)
- Coordinates: 26.51465°N 91.50775°E
- Country: India
- State: Assam
- District: Kamrup
- Elevation: 46 m (151 ft)

Languages
- Time zone: UTC+5:30 (IST)
- PIN: 781127
- Vehicle registration: AS

Alupati is a village in the Kamrup district of Assam, India.

== See also ==
- Akadi
