= Sutargaon =

- Village
- Location in Assam, India Sutargaon (India)
- Coordinates: 26.45°N 91.73°E
- Country: India
- State: Assam
- Region: Western Assam
- District: Kamrup

Government
  - Body: Gram panchayat
- Elevation: 42 m (138 ft)

Languages
  - Official: Assamese
- Time zone: UTC+5:30 (IST)
- PIN: 781381
- Vehicle registration: AS
- Website: kamrup.nic.in

Sutargaon is a village in Kamrup rural district, situated in north bank of river Brahmaputra, surrounded by Baihata, Goreswar.

== Transport ==
The village is located north of National Highway 31, connected to nearby towns and cities with regular buses and other modes of transportation.

== See also ==
- Balikuchi
- Ukiam
