= Kanek =

Kanek may refer to:

- Kan Ek', the name of various kings of the Itza Maya
- Kanik, a village in Iran
