= Langpih =

Village in Meghalaya, India

- Village
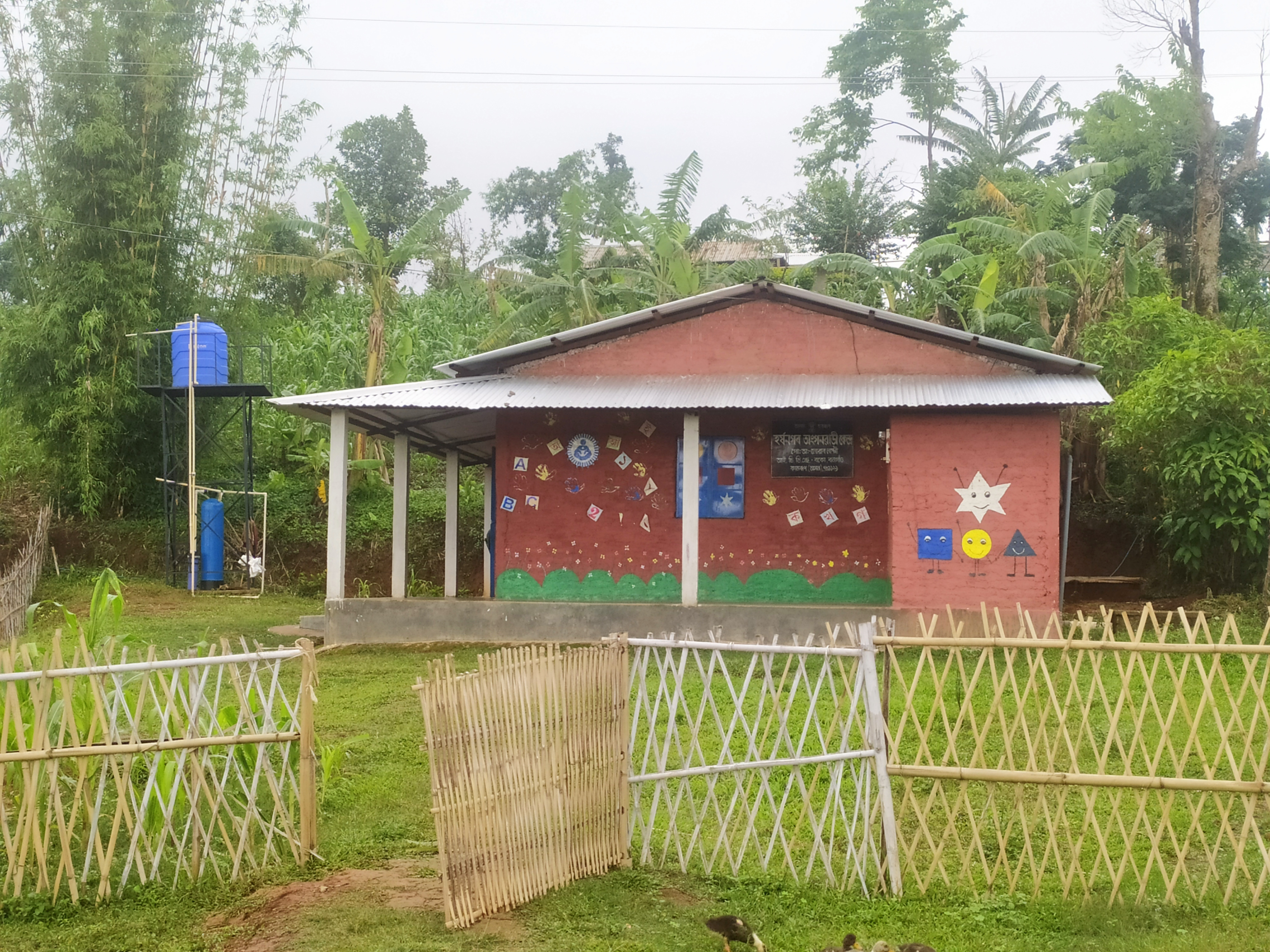
- Anganwadi center at Lampi

- Location within Assam Location within India
- Coordinates: 25°50′10.65″N 91°10′9.78″E

Langpih, also spelt Langpi, Lampi, or Lumpi is a village in northeast India. It is located near the border of West Khasi Hills district, Meghalaya and Kamrup district, Assam. In Meghalaya's administrative structure, it is under Kyrdum gram panchayat, Mawshynrut block, West Khasi Hills district, whereas Assam assigns it to No. 9 Dakhin Pub Boko gram panchayat, Boko-Bongaon block, Kamrup district, with the Postal Index Number 781129 (shared with Hahimbazar, Nalapara, and Samuka, which are all in No. 70 Dakhin Pub Luki gram panchayat).

== Facilities ==
The village is served by a government health sub-centre, but it is not staffed by doctors. Teachers rarely come to the village's two schools. The village is not electrified. The village is served by one road, in poor condition, connecting it to the Riangdo-Boko road which itself connects to National Highway 37 in Assam, at a junction just west of Boko. Another 5 kilometres (3.1 mi) road from neighbouring Kthiehthawiar to Meghalaya was under construction in 2008. That would connect Langpih through Kthiehthawiar to a junction with National Highway 44 just west of Nongstoin. It remained under construction by 2011.

In 2008, the Assam government began building a health centre and police outpost in the village, and Assam police reportedly detained Meghalaya journalists who came to cover the event. Meghalaya Deputy Chief Minister Hopingstone Lyngdoh stated that once the Kthiehthawiar–Meghalaya road was complete, the Meghalaya Police would move their temporary police outpost in the area from Lejadubi to Langpih. He stated that two platoons of police would be stationed in the village. Assam Chief Secretary P. C. Sharma rebutted that his state would not allow this.

== Territorial dispute ==
=== 1950s to 1990s ===
Langpih is the subject of a long-running dispute between the Meghalaya and Assam state governments, one of twelve such disputed territories. According to Meghalaya Chief Minister Donkapur Roy, the British annexed the village to Assam's Kamrup district, but then after Indian independence, it was assigned to the United Khasi and Jaintia Hills district, a district in today's Meghalaya state. The Meghalaya government claims that Assam's 1951 demarcation shows the area as part of a district in what would later become Meghalaya state. However, in 1972, Assam's new demarcation showed the area as part of its own Mikir Hills district (now Karbi Anglong District).

In 1974, government forces from the two states had a faceoff in the village after Meghalaya policemen allegedly expelled Nepalese grazers, leading Assam policemen to arrive and investigate. Link magazine described the situation as "explosive". Hopingstone Lyngdoh claims that Assam "encroached on the village in 1979" and since then encouraged further Assamese settlement there. In 1988, it was claimed in the Lok Sabha that the government of Meghalaya had proposed to set up an electoral constituency, 34-Nongstoin, which covered Kamphaduli, Hakumari, and Langpih.

=== 2010s ===
The Langpih Incident occurred on 14 May 2010, when clashes broke out between the Nepalese and tribal Khasi people, leading to shootings by police. National media reported that four Khasi villagers died of the gunshot wounds: Columbus Hujon, Charles Lyngkhoi, Dennis Nonsiej, and Ekros Rani. Reports of the total number of injured varied between twelve and twenty-six. The governments of Assam and Meghalaya have each reported the death toll as two; even this death toll has become an object of political controversy, with authorities of each state moving the corpses around across state borders to manipulate the number. A monument was constructed in memory of the dead villagers.

Repercussions of the 2010 incident continued to be felt in 2012, when Pynskhemlang Nongshlong of neighbouring Rambrai village planned to lead a hunger strike in memory of the four slain men. Nongshlong and thirteen fellow activists took to a stage constructed by local people specially for their fast. Two hours after the fast began, the Assistant District Commissioner of Kamrup and 150 police of Assam State arrived at the site. However, Langpih villagers formed a human chain to deny access to police. By the eighth day, eight of the fasters had been retired to Shillong Civil Hospital due to ill health; Nongshlong and five others remained, but were clearly suffering from the effects of dehydration. As the fast neared its second week, Meghalaya Chief Minister Mukul Sangma appealed to Delhi for assistance.

Nongshlong declared an end to the fast on 13 July, giving the government a deadline of two months to fulfill a list of demands which the villagers would later announce. However, on 16 July Nongshlong and four women resumed their fast at Nongstoin. Around the same time, the Meghalaya People’s Human Rights Council sent a delegation to the 20th Session of the United Nations Human Rights Council in Geneva, Switzerland. MPHRC General Secretary Dino Dympep met with UN Special Rapporteur James Anaya regarding the 2010 killings, following which Anaya sent a communique to the Government of India. However, by the following month the GOI had failed to respond.
