= Agchia =

- Town
- Location in Kamrup, India Agchia (India)
- Coordinates: 26.0005347°N 91.2653402°E
- Country: India
- State: Assam
- District: Kamrup
- Elevation: 46 m (151 ft)

Languages
- Time zone: UTC+5:30 (IST)
- PIN: 781128
- Vehicle registration: AS

Agchia is a town in Kamrup district of Assam, situated on the south bank of the Brahmaputra River between Boko and Chaygaon towns.

== Transportation ==
Agchia is connected to nearby towns through National highway 17.

== See also ==
- Aggumi
