= Halogaon =

Village in Assam, India

Halogaon is a village in Kamrup district of Assam state of India.
