= Kochpara =

- city
- Location in Assam, India Kochpara (India)
- Coordinates: 26°25′00″N 91°21′51″E
- Country: India
- State: Assam
- District: Kamrup

Population (2001)
  - Total: 6,028

Languages
  - Official: Assamese
- Time zone: UTC+5:30 (IST)
- Vehicle registration: AS

Kochpara is a census town in Kamrup district in the Indian state of Assam.

== Demographics ==
As of 2001 India census, Kochpara had a population of 6028. Males constitute 51% of the population and females 49%. Kochpara has an average literacy rate of 85%, higher than the national average of 59.5%: male literacy is 89%, and female literacy is 81%. In Kochpara, 9% of the population is under 6 years of age.
