= Baghdoba =

- Village
- Location in Assam, India Baghdoba (India)
- Coordinates: 26.53°N 91.69°E
- Country: India
- State: Assam
- Region: Western Assam
- District: Kamrup

Government
  - Body: Gram panchayat

Languages
  - Official: Assamese
- Time zone: UTC+5:30 (IST)
- PIN: 781366
- Vehicle registration: AS
- Website: kamrup.nic.in

Baghdoba is a village in Kamrup rural district, in the state of Assam, India, situated on the north bank of river Brahmaputra.

== Transport ==
The village is connected through National Highway 27 to nearby towns and cities.

== See also ==
- Bagmarachar
- Badlabazar
