= Langpih Incident =

2010 ethnic clashes in Nepal

- Part of the Assam-Meghalaya Border Conflict
- Location: Langpih, Meghalaya state, India
- Date: 14 May 2010; 16 years ago
- Target: Khasi Civilians
- Attack type: Police brutality
- Deaths: 4 killed
- Injuries: 12-26 injured
- Perpetrator: Assam Police
- Motive: Land Dispute

The Langpih Incident occurred on 14 May 2010, when clashes broke out between Nepalese Ghorka and Khasi people, leading to shootings by Assam Police.

== Background ==
For decades prior, Nepali migration into Meghalaya greatly alarmed the native Khasi and Garo peoples, setting off an insurgency and later ethnic cleansing. In November 2008, amidst the larger Assam-Meghalaya Border Conflict, a dispute over the ownership of the Langpih area (known as Rimuliang to the Khasi) intensified when the Meghalayan Government stated their intention to set up a police outpost on the outskirts of that region.

== Event ==
On May 14, 2010, a dispute between the migrant Nepali people and the local Khasi and Garo peoples began after the Nepali people claimed the local "hat" (weekly) market in the area. The Assam Police were called in, firing on the Khasi, killing 4 and injuring 12 to 26.

== Victims and Casualties ==
National media reported that four Khasi villagers died of gunshot wounds as a result of the firing:

- Columbus Hujon
- Charles Lyngkhoi
- Dennis Nonsiej
- Ekros Rani

Reports of the total number of injured varied between twelve and twenty-six.
The governments of Assam and Meghalaya each reported the death toll as two, with even the death toll becoming an object of political controversy, with authorities of each state moving the corpses around across state borders to manipulate the number of dead.

== Aftermath ==
=== 2012 Hunger Strike ===
Repercussions of the 2010 incident continued to be felt in 2012, when Pynskhemlang Nongshlong of neighbouring Rambrai village planned to lead a hunger strike in memory of the four slain men. Nongshlong and thirteen fellow activists took to a stage constructed by local people specially for their fast. Two hours after the fast began, the Assistant District Commissioner of Kamrup and 150 police of Assam State arrived at the site. However, Langpih villagers formed a human chain to deny access to police.

After that, According to the directives issued by the Deputy Commissioner of Kamrup District in Assam, convoys of villagers belonging to the Rabha tribe and the Nepali community from Assam, escorted by Assam Police, arrived at the village and vandalized the Durbar Hall of Hima Raid Mynsaw. After this, the hall was forcibly seized by Assamese authorities and converted into quarters for Assam Police personnel, who still occupy the premises. After this, another conflict erupted when the locals tried to create a new community hall in the area. Mr. Swingly Samakha, the chief of Hima Raid Mynsaw, emphasized that there was no need to inform the Assam Government about the hall's construction as it was funded entirely by the villagers' generosity, without any government involvement.

The incident was brought to the attention of the Union Minister by the then Chief Minister of Meghalaya, Dr. Mukul Sangma, who expressed concern over the demolition of the Durbar hall by the Kamrup Administration.

By the eighth day of the fast, eight of the fasters had been retired to Shillong Civil Hospital due to ill health; Nongshlong and five others remained, but were clearly suffering from the effects of dehydration. As the fast neared its second week, Meghalaya Chief Minister Mukul Sangma appealed to Delhi for assistance.

Nongshlong declared an end to the fast on 13 July, giving the government a deadline of two months to fulfill a list of demands which the villagers would later announce. However, on 16 July Nongshlong and four women resumed their fast at Nongstoin. Around the same time, the Meghalaya People’s Human Rights Council sent a delegation to the 20th Session of the United Nations Human Rights Council in Geneva, Switzerland. MPHRC General Secretary Dino Dympep met with UN Special Rapporteur James Anaya regarding the 2010 killings, following which Anaya sent a communique to the Government of India. However, by the following month the GOI had failed to respond.

A monument was constructed in memory of the dead villagers.

In March 2020, the conflict escalated after the Assam Police tried to set up a border outpost in Umwali village in Langpih, which caused tension amongst the local Khasi people. Following this, a BJP MLA from Meghalaya sought Union Home Minister Amit Shah's help in October 2020 to resolve the border dispute. As of 2023, negotiations on the issue were ongoing.
