= Rampur, Kamrup =

Rampur
- Town
- Location in Assam, India Rampur (India)
- Coordinates: 26.08°N 91.47°E
- Country: India
- State: Assam
- Region: Western Assam
- District: Kamrup

Languages
  - Official: Assamese
- Time zone: UTC+5:30 (IST)
- PIN: 781132
- Vehicle registration: AS
- Website: kamrup.nic.in

Rampur is a town in Kamrup rural district, situated in south bank of river Brahmaputra in the state of Assam, India. It is surrounded by Chaygaon, Nagrijuli, Rani and Sualkuchi towns in west, north and east, respectively.

== Transport ==
The town is near National Highway 37, and is connected to nearby towns and cities with regular buses and other modes of transportation. The nearest Railway station is at Mirza and the nearest airport is at Guwahati.

== See also ==
- Rowmari
- Rangmahal
