= Kanik =

Kanik may refer to:

== People ==
- Ľudovít Kaník (born 1965), Slovak politician
- Mateusz Kanik, Polish video game designer
- Orhan Veli Kanık (1914–1950), Turkish poet
- Tytus Kanik (born 1984), Polish darts player

== Other ==
- Kanik, a winter camping program of Philmont Scout Ranch
- Kanik, Iran, village in eastern Iran

== See also ==
- Kanika (disambiguation)
