= Dubi, Pathsala =

Dubi
- Village
- Location in Assam, India Dubi (India)
- Coordinates: 26.50°N 91.21°E
- Country: India
- State: Assam
- Region: Western Assam
- District: Bajali

Government
  - Body: Gram panchayat

Languages
  - Official: Assamese
- Time zone: UTC+5:30 (IST)
- Vehicle registration: AS
- Website: barpeta.nic.in

Dubi is a village in now newly formed Bajali district, Assam State, India. It is situated on the north bank of the Brahmaputra River. It is about three miles from the Pathshala railway station on the N. F. Railway.

== Transport ==
The village is accessible through National Highway 31 and connected to nearby towns and cities with regular buses and other modes of transportation.

== See also ==
- Titkuri
- Tukrapara
