= Natun Batabari =

- Village
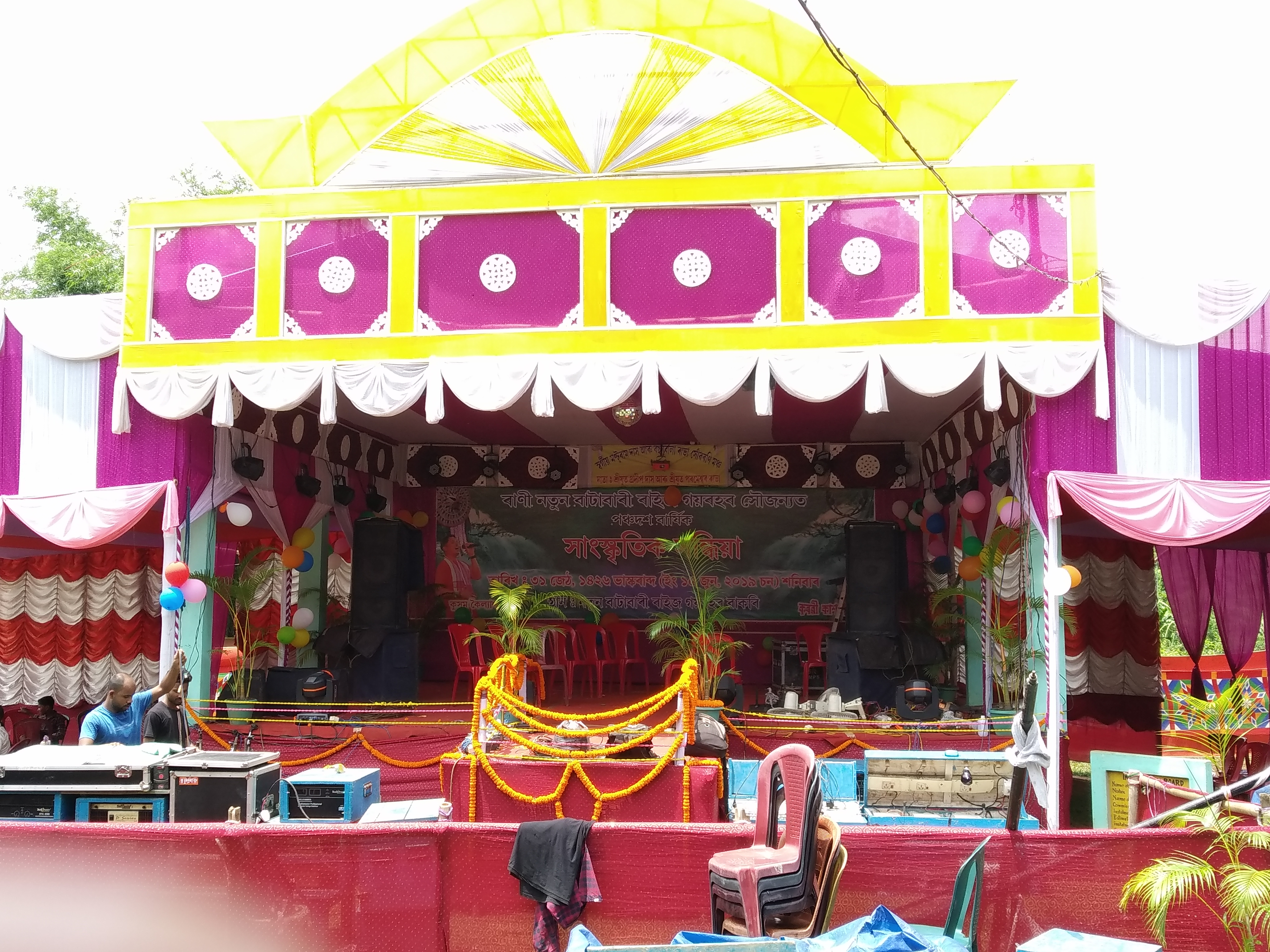
- 2019 Cultural Program at Natun Batabari

- Location in Assam, India Natun Batabari (India)
- Coordinates: 26.031155°N 91.585573°E
- Country: India
- State: Assam
- Region: Western Assam
- District: Kamrup

Government
  - Body: Gram panchayat

Languages
  - Official: Assamese
- Time zone: UTC+5:30 (IST)
- PIN: 781131
- Vehicle registration: AS
- Website: kamrup.assam.gov.in

Natun Batabari is a village in Kamrup rural district, situated in Rani, Kamrup.The village is located on the Rabha Hasong Autonomous Council area as well as the Assam Meghalaya border.

== Transport ==
The village is accessible through National Highway 37 and connected to nearby towns and cities with regular buses and other modes of transportation.
