= Balikuchi =

- Village
- Location in Assam, India Balikuchi (India)
- Coordinates: 26.39°N 91.68°E
- Country: India
- State: Assam
- Region: Western Assam
- District: Kamrup

Government
  - Type: Panchayati raj (India)
  - Body: Gram panchayat
- Elevation: 42 m (138 ft)

Population (2001)
  - Total: 1,148,824

Languages
  - Official: Assamese
- Time zone: UTC+5:30 (IST)
- PIN: 781381
- Vehicle registration: AS
- Website: kamrup.nic.in

Balikuchi is a village in Kamrup rural district, situated in north bank of river Brahmaputra.

== Transport ==
The village is near National Highway 31 and connected to nearby towns and cities with regular buses, trekkers and other modes of transport.

== See also ==
- Villages of Nalbari District
- Uzankuri
