= Aradanga =

- Village
- Country: India
- State: Assam
- Region: Western Assam
- District: Kamrup

Government
  - Body: Gram panchayat
- Elevation: 51 m (167 ft)

Languages
  - Official: Assamese
- Time zone: UTC+5:30 (IST)
- PIN: 781129
- Vehicle registration: AS
- Website: kamrup.nic.in

Aradanga is a village in Kamrup district.

== Transport ==
The village is connected to Guwahati with regular buses and other modes of transportation.

== See also ==
- Amatala
