= Sapporo Masjid =

Mosque in Sapporo, Hokkaido, Japan

- 札幌マスジド
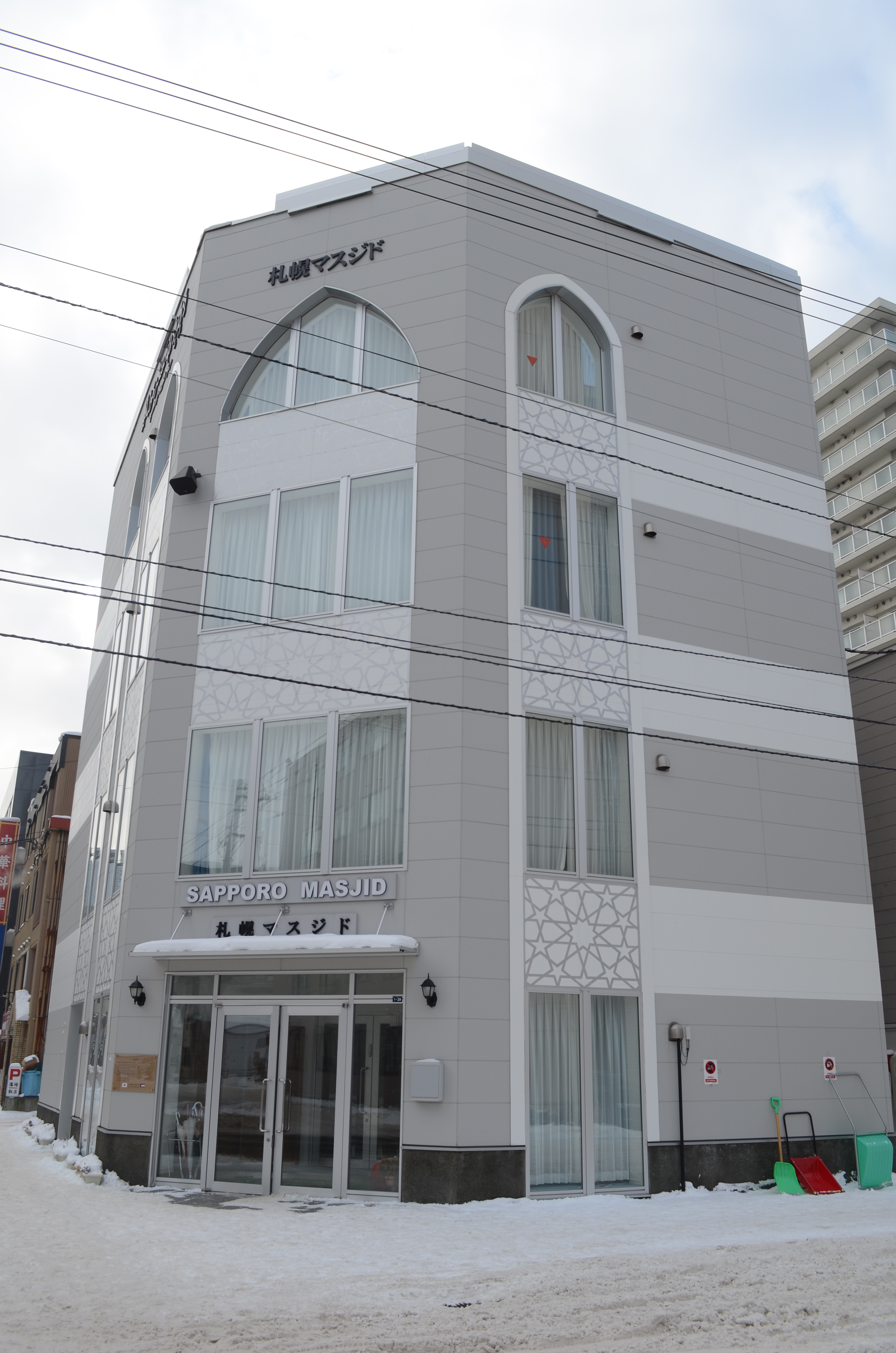
- The Sapporo Masjid in 2024

Religion
- Affiliation: Islam
- Year consecrated: 1993
- Status: Active

Location
- Location: Kita-ku, Sapporo, Hokkaido
- Country: Japan
- Interactive map of Sapporo Masjid
- Coordinates: 43°4′38.9″N 141°20′51.5″E

Architecture
- Type: Mosque
- Completed: November 2023 (current building)
- Construction cost: ¥250 million

Website
- sapporomasjid.or.jp

The Sapporo Masjid (Japanese: 札幌マスジド) is a mosque in Kita-ku, Sapporo, Hokkaido, Japan. It is run by the Hokkaido Islamic Society. The original mosque was housed inside a residential building and opened in 1993; it was the first mosque in Hokkaido. In 2023, the mosque moved to a larger building in Kita-ku to accommodate the growing Muslim community in the city.

The mosque conducts Islamic services in several languages, including English, Arabic, and Bengali. Educational seminars and cultural outreach events and celebrations are also open to non-Muslims.

== History ==
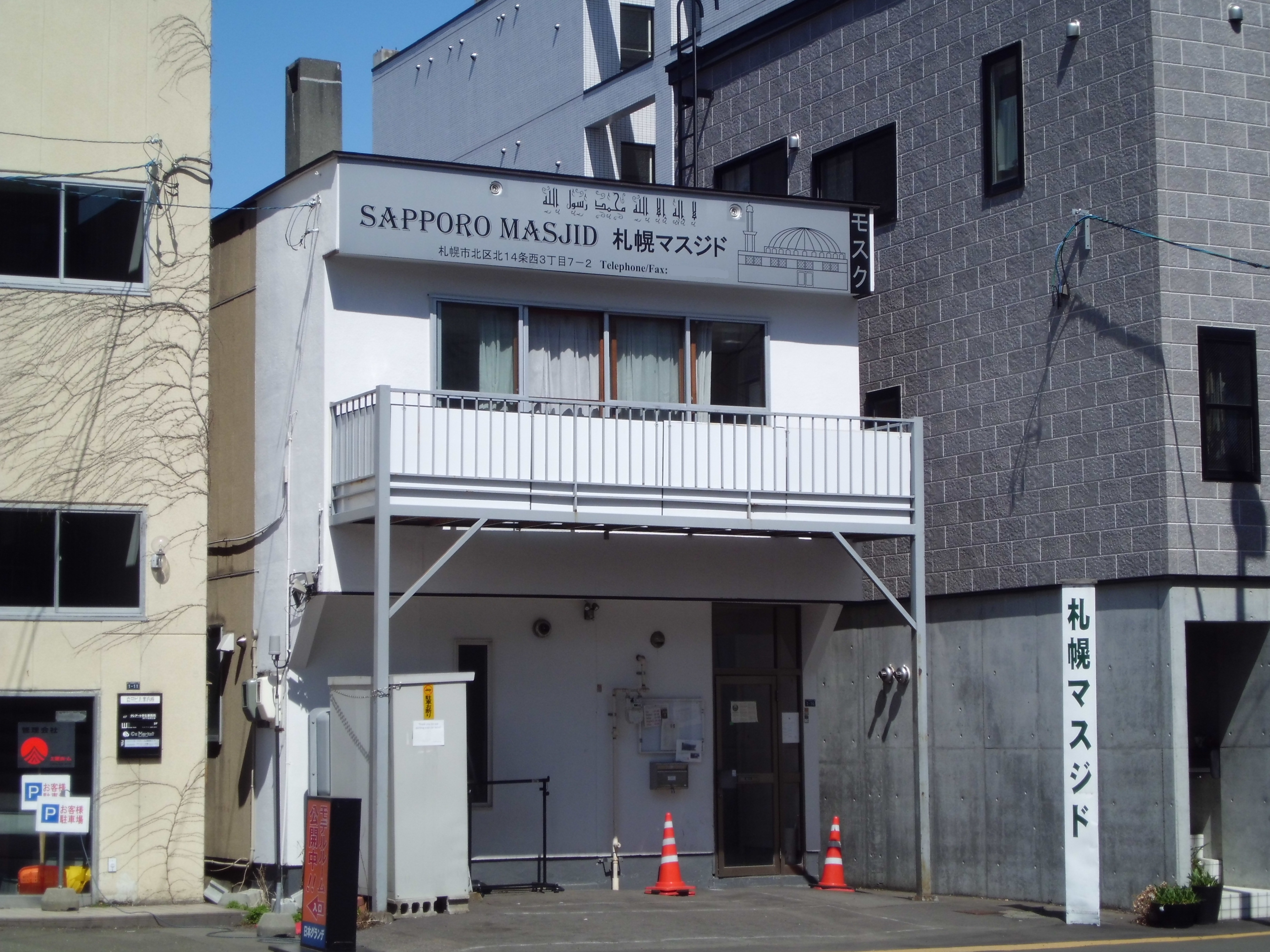
The original building in 2015

The Sapporo Masjid opened in 1993 and was the first mosque in Hokkaido. It was originally housed within a multi-tenant building in Kita-ku, but the space became too small as the number of worshippers grew over the years.

The mosque moved to a larger building in the ward and was opened in November 2023 following extensive renovations costing ¥250 million, funded by donations from within Japan and abroad. Additionally, mosques have also been built in neighbouring Ebetsu and Otaru to accommodate the approximately 10,000 Muslims living in Hokkaido (as of November 2025).

== Services ==
The Sapporo Masjid is run by the Hokkaido Islamic Society, which conducts services such as religious education, cultural outreach events, Islamic marriages, and Islamic funerals.

The current building is four stories tall and contains areas for wudu (ritual washing) on the first and fourth floors, and separate prayer rooms for men and women. Service is conducted in several languages, including English, Arabic, and Bengali.

=== Outreach ===
The Sapporo Masjid has held seminars for Japanese locals, particularly university students, who are interested in learning about Islam and the Muslim community in Hokkaido. The mosque hosted students from the Hokkai School of Commerce in 2023 and Sapporo University in 2025.

Parties open to both Muslims and non-Muslims are held at the mosque during Islamic holidays such as Eid al-Fitr and Eid al-Adha, as well as celebrations during holy months like Ramadan.
