= Rowmari =

- Village
- Location in Assam, India Rowmari (India)
- Coordinates: 26.29°N 91.32°E
- Country: India
- State: Assam
- Region: Western Assam
- District: Kamrup

Government
  - Body: Gram panchayat

Languages
  - Official: Assamese
- Time zone: UTC+5:30 (IST)
- PIN: 781104
- Vehicle registration: AS
- Website: kamrup.nic.in

Rowmari is a village in Kamrup rural district, in the state of Assam, India, situated on the north bank of river Brahmaputra.

== Transport ==
The village is near National Highway 31 and connected to nearby towns and cities with regular buses and other modes of transportation.

== See also ==
- Rangmahal
- Rani
