= Amtala (Kamrup) =

- Village
- Location in Assam, India Amtala (India)
- Coordinates: 26.10°N 91.39°E
- Country: India
- State: Assam
- Region: Western Assam
- District: Kamrup

Government
  - Body: Gram panchayat
- Elevation: 51 m (167 ft)

Languages
  - Official: Assamese
- Time zone: UTC+5:30 (IST)
- PIN: 781134
- Vehicle registration: AS
- Website: kamrup.nic.in

Amtala is a village in Kamrup district, situated in the south bank of the river Brahmaputra.

== Transport ==
The village is near National Highway 17 (India) and connected to nearby towns and cities like Bijoynagar, Chaygaon and Guwahati with regular buses and other modes of transportation.

== See also ==
- Aradanga
