= Palasbari Assembly constituency =

Constituency of the Assam legislative assembly in India

Palasbari
- Constituency No. 29 for the Assam Legislative Assembly

Constituency details
- Country: India
- Region: Northeast India
- State: Assam
- District: Kamrup
- Lok Sabha constituency: Guwahati
- Established: 1951
- Reservation: None

Member of Legislative Assembly
- 16th Assam Legislative Assembly
- Incumbent Himangshu Shekhar Baishya
- Party: Bharatiya Janata Party
- Elected year: 2026

Palasbari Assembly constituency is one of the 126 assembly constituencies of Assam Legislative Assembly. Palasbari forms part of the Guwahati Lok Sabha constituency.

== Members of Legislative Assembly ==
- 1951: Harendra Goswami , Socialist Party
- 1957: Radhika Ram Das, Indian National Congress
- 1962: Radhika Ram Das, Indian National Congress
- 1967: A. K. Goswami, Indian National Congress
- 1972: Harendra Nath Talukdar, Indian National Congress
- 1978: Harendra Goswami , Janata Party
- 1983: Mohan Basumatari, Indian National Congress
- 1985: Jatin Mali, Independent
- 1991: Jatin Mali, Asom Gana Parishad
- 1996: Jatin Mali, Asom Gana Parishad
- 2001: Pranab Kalita, Independent
- 2006: Pranab Kalita, Independent
- 2011: Jatin Mali, Independent
- 2016: Pranab Kalita, Bharatiya Janata Party
- 2021: Hemanga Thakuria, Bharatiya Janata Party

== Election results ==
=== 2026 ===
2026 Assam Legislative Assembly election: Palasbari
Party	Candidate	Votes	%	±%
BJP	Himangshu Shekhar Baishya	109,301	58.58	
AJP	Pankaj Lochan Goswami	65,348	35.02	
Independent	Jayanta Mahanta	3111	1.67	
Aam Admi Party	Elvin Baruah	2,317	1.24	
NOTA	NOTA	2,173	1.16	
Margin of victory		43953		
Turnout		186,581		
Rejected ballots				
Registered electors				
gain from		Swing		

=== 2016 ===
2016 Assam Legislative Assembly election: Palasbari
Party	Candidate	Votes	%	±%
BJP	Pranab Kalita	75,210	61.93	+60.09
INC	Nabajyoti Talukdar	26,468	21.79	+2.91
Independent	Jatin Mali	15,755	12.97	−21.71
Independent	Kushal Chandra Sarma	991	0.81	N/A
LDP	Juri Mali	980	0.80	N/A
RJP	Palash Jyoti Das	467	0.38	N/A
NOTA	None of the above	1,564	1.28	N/A
Majority		48,742	40.14	+39.54
Turnout		1,21,435	87.99	+6.07
Registered electors		1,38,002		
BJP gain from Independent		Swing		

=== 2011 ===
2011 Assam Legislative Assembly election: Palasbari
Party	Candidate	Votes	%	±%
Independent	Jatin Mali	36,718	34.68	
Independent	Pranab Kalita	36,038	34.08	
INC	Niva Sharma Thakuria	19,993	18.88	
AGP	Anup Medhi	10,577	9.99	
BJP	Hemanga Thakuria	1,953	1.84	
AITC	Lalita Baishya	593	0.56	
Majority		680	0.60	
Turnout		1,05,872	81.92	
Registered electors		1,29,231		
Independent gain from Independent		Swing		
