= Bamun Sualkuchi =

- city
- Location in Assam, India Bamun Sualkuchi (India)
- Coordinates: 26°10′10″N 91°34′21″E
- Country: India
- State: Assam
- District: Kamrup

Population (2001)
  - Total: 7,123

Languages
  - Official: Assamese
- Time zone: UTC+5:30 (IST)
- Vehicle registration: AS
- Website: www.sualkuchi.com

Bamun Sualkuchi is a census town in Kamrup district in the state of Assam, India.

== Demographics ==
As of 2001 India census, Bamun Sualkuchi had a population of 7123. Males constitute 49% of the population and females 51%. Bamun Sualkuchi has an average literacy rate of 74%, higher than the national average of 59.5%; with 54% of the males and 46% of females literate. 10% of the population is under 6 years of age.
