= Srihati =

- Village
- Location in Assam, India Srihati (India)
- Coordinates: 26.21°N 91.56°E
- Country: India
- State: Assam
- Region: Western Assam
- District: Kamrup

Government
  - Body: Gram panchayat
- Elevation: 42 m (138 ft)

Languages
  - Official: Assamese
- Time zone: UTC+5:30 (IST)
- PIN: 781103
- Vehicle registration: AS
- Website: kamrup.nic.in

Srihati is a village in Kamrup rural district, situated near south bank of river Brahmaputra.

== Transport ==
The village is located north of National Highway 37, connected to nearby towns and cities with regular buses and other modes of transportation.

== See also ==
- Hajo
- Kamalpur
