= Aggumi =

- Village
- Location in Kamrup, India Aggumi (India)
- Coordinates: 26.0701321°N 91.2912081°E
- Country: India
- State: Assam
- District: Kamrup
- Elevation: 46 m (151 ft)

Languages
- Time zone: UTC+5:30 (IST)
- PIN: 781137
- Vehicle registration: AS

Aggumi is a village in Kamrup district of Assam, situated on the south bank of the Brahmaputra river, near Chaygaon town.

== Transportation ==
Aggumi is connected to nearby towns through National highway 17.

== See also ==
- Agchia
