= Nohira =

Nohira (written: 野平) is a Japanese surname. Notable people with the surname include:

- Akio Nohira (野平 明雄), Japanese table tennis player
- Shunsui Nohira (野平 俊水, born 1968), pen name of Shunpei Mizuno, Japanese academic and writer
- Takao Nohira (野平 孝雄), Japanese table tennis player
