= Silsako =

Ancient stone bridge in Assam, India

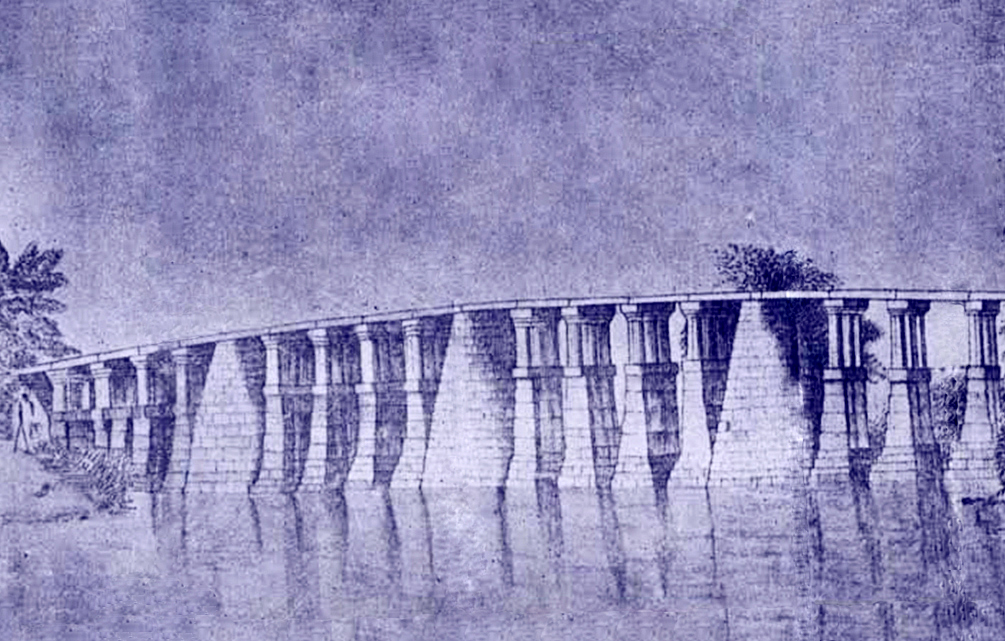
Silsako in 1851

Silsako was an ancient stone bridge over a channel of river Barnadi (Bornadi) in Hajo, Kamrup. As the channel changed its course over time, now the bridge is stranded in the middle of a small lake. It was an important transit route in ancient and medieval times. Invaders like Muhammad bin Bakhtiyar Khalji entered into Kamrup in the year 1205-06 AD, and crossed the bridge Silsako. This historical bridge sustained damage in the 1897 Assam earthquake.

Hannay, who in 1851 saw and measured the bridge, wrote as follows:

From the great care taken in the chiselling, squaring and fitting up of the component parts of the whole, as well as the great size and weight, the work is one of great strength and solidity. And this accounts for the good state of preservation in which it find it in the present day; for with the exception of the masonry of the abutment at each end, in which large trees have taken root and displaced the stones, the rest of the structure may be said to be entire. From a fracture in one of the pillars I observed that. the upper blocks were kept in their places by means of iron pins firmly wedged into the lower ones; four apparently through the centre and one on each side of the square of the shaft, and although not visible, other portions of the work may be iron-clamped; the slabs of the platform were marked with clamping holes and on the edge of the outside slabs are three square holes (3 inches square) which were no doubt intended for the wooden supports of a balustrade. Several frieze-carved blocks are also lying near the end abutment from which I imagine the entrance of each may have been ornamented or these may have been gateways." "The design and style of architecture of this bridge evidently belongs to a remote period in the annals of Kamrup and, in its original structure at least, must be co-eval with the erection of the ancient Brahmanical temples the remains of which are found so widely scattered throughout the length and breadth of Assam; the works of its former Brahmanical kings, a race long ago extinct in the annals of modem Hinduism and of whom the present race in Assam know nothing

— S.F Hannay, 1851

== See also ==
- Rock architecture in India
