= Hahara =

Hahara is a village and a district in India. The village lies on the bank of the Puthimari river in Kamrup.

Hahara is an agricultural area specialising in vegetables. The town has one primary school and three upper schools. Cultural activity includes the Magh Bihu festival, on a stage provided by IOCL guwahati.

The village also suffered during the 2008 floods, a breach in the embankment - allegedly caused by bridge construction work - causing flooding in Hahara town and the surrounding area.
