= Stakna =

- Village
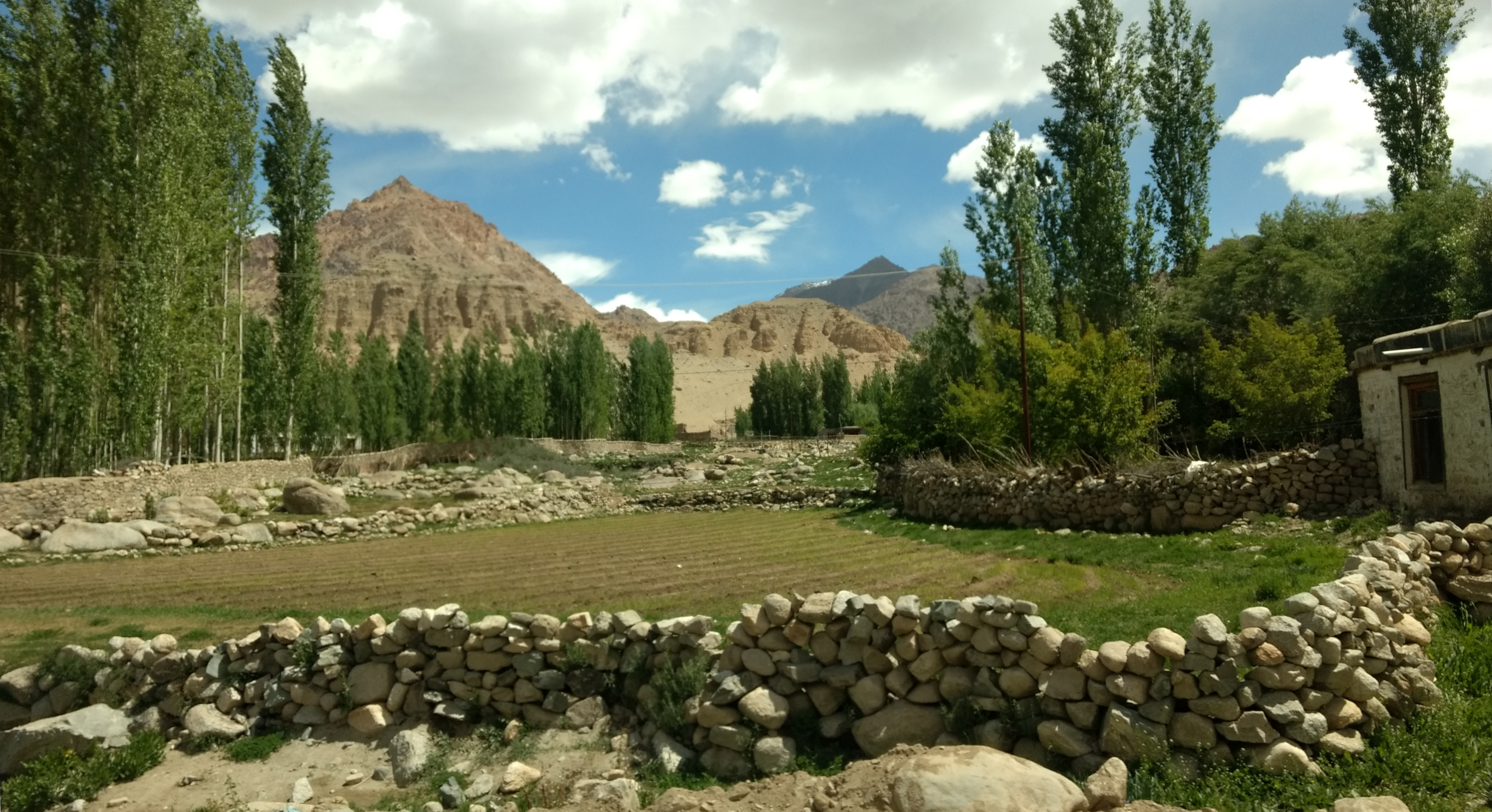
- Stakna

- Location in Ladakh, India Stakna (India)
- Coordinates: 33.9955604°N 77.6851069°E
- Country: India
- Union Territory: Ladakh
- District: Leh
- Tehsil: Chushot
- Elevation: 3,287 m (10,784 ft)

Population (2011)
  - Total: 355

Languages
  - Official: Ladakhi/Bhoti, Hindi, English
- Time zone: UTC+5:30 (IST)
- 2011 census code: 879

Stakna is a village in the Leh district of Ladakh, India, on the banks of the Indus River in Chushot tehsil. The Stakna Monastery is located there.

== Demographics ==
According to the 2011 census of India, Stakna has 88 households. The effective literacy rate (i.e. the literacy rate of population excluding children aged 6 and below) is 70.61%.

Demographics (2011 census)
	Total	Male	Female
Population	355	171	184
Children aged below 6 years	42	23	19
Scheduled caste	0	0	0
Scheduled tribe	355	171	184
Literates	221	109	112
Workers (all)	199	99	100
Main workers (total)	45	28	17
Main workers: Cultivators	1	0	1
Main workers: Agricultural labourers	0	0	0
Main workers: Household industry workers	0	0	0
Main workers: Other	44	28	16
Marginal workers (total)	154	71	83
Marginal workers: Cultivators	124	45	79
Marginal workers: Agricultural labourers	9	6	3
Marginal workers: Household industry workers	0	0	0
Marginal workers: Others	21	20	1
Non-workers	156	72	84
