= Pranab Kalita =

Indian politician

Pranab Kalita is a Bharatiya Janata Party politician from Assam, India.He has been elected in Assam Legislative Assembly election in 2016 from Palasbari constituency.
