= Rangmahal =

- Village
- Location in Assam, India Rangmahal (India)
- Coordinates: 26.18°N 91.67°E
- Country: India
- State: Assam
- Region: Western Assam
- District: Kamrup

Government
  - Body: Gram panchayat

Languages
  - Official: Assamese
- Time zone: UTC+5:30 (IST)
- PIN: 781030
- ISO 3166 code: IN-AS
- Vehicle registration: AS
- Website: kamrup.nic.in

Rangmahal is a village in North Guwahati, Kamrup rural district, situated in north bank of river Brahmaputra.

== Transport ==
The village lies near National Highway 31, and is connected to nearby towns and cities via regular buses and other modes of transportation.

== See also ==
- Rani
- Rampur
