= Chanmaguri =

Village in Assam, India

Chanmaguri Sonmaguri
- Village
- Chanmaguri Village
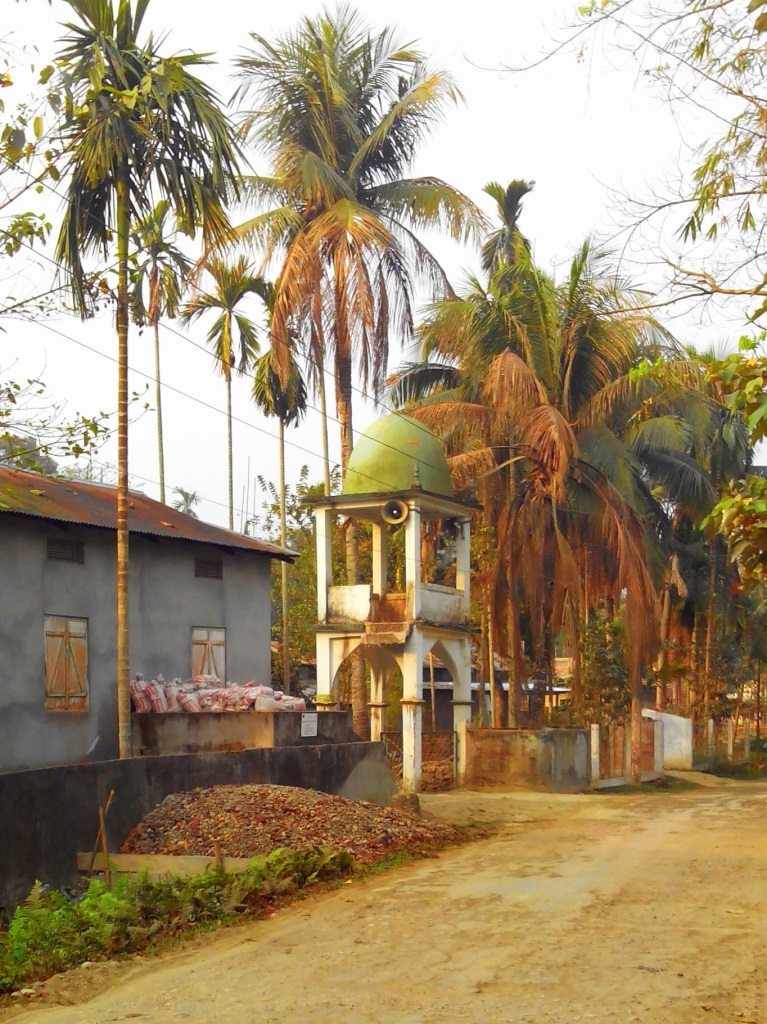
- Chanmaguri Jame Mosque

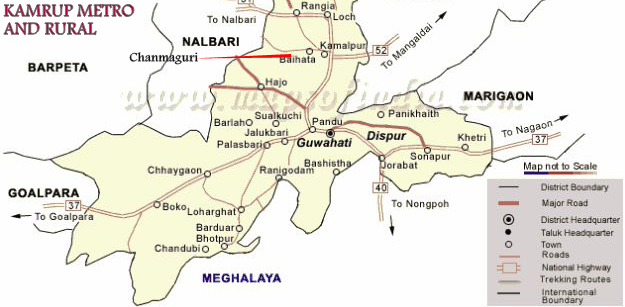
- Location of Chanmaguri

- Location within India
- Country: India
- State: Assam
- Region: Lower Assam
- District: Kamrup

Population
  - Total: 1,194

Demographics
  - Literacy: 87.84%

Language
  - Official: Assamese
- PIN: 781380

Chanmaguri (Sonmaguri in ancient times, Chanmaguri in the modern era) is a village in India and is located in the Rangia mandal/tehsil, Kamrup district, Assam. Rangia is the nearest town (12 km) and Guwahati is the nearest city (30 km) from Chanmaguri.

== Etymology ==
In ancient times the village was known as Sonmaguri. Sonmaguri derives its name from the Assamese words meaning gold and meaning one type of rice, golden colour rice (Paddy). After the revolution of time, Sonmaguri changed to Chanmaguri.

== Agriculture ==
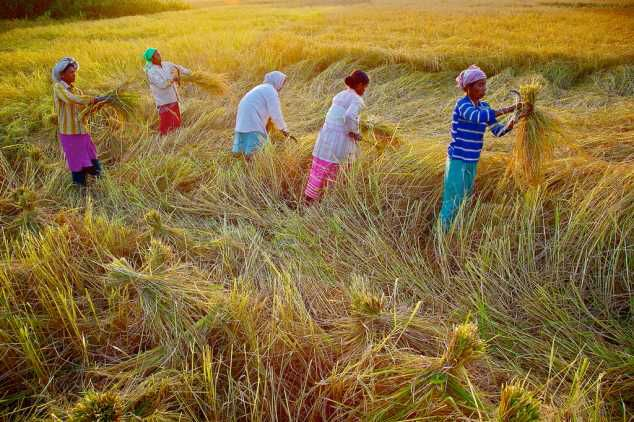
Harvesting of Rice

Coordinates of Chanmaguri village are 26°04′49″N, 91°33′35″E/ 26.0802867°N, 91.5596117°E. Various types of plants are cultivated in this village but mainly produced various types of rice, vegetables, oil, etc.

== Climate ==
Chanmaguri has a humid subtropical climate (Köppen climate classification Cwa), falling just short of a tropical savanna climate (Köppen climate classification Aw). The average annual temperature is 24.2 °C with extremes ranging from 40.6 °C recorded on 24 April 2014 to 3 °C recorded in January, 1964.

== Transport ==
Chanmaguri is accessible through National Highway 31 and Hajo-Guwahati State Highway. All major private commercial vehicles play between Chanmaguri and nearby towns. Nearest Railway station are Rangia Railway station and Guwahati Railway station.
