= Hatipara =

- Village
- Location in Assam, India Hatipara (India)
- Coordinates: 26.101034°N 91.286919°E
- Country: India
- State: Assam
- Region: Western Assam
- District: Kamrup

Government
  - Body: Gram panchayat

Languages
  - Official: Assamese
- Time zone: UTC+5:30 (IST)
- PIN: 781137
- Vehicle registration: AS
- Website: kamrup.nic.in

Hatipara is a village in Kamrup rural district, situated on the bank of river Brahmaputra.

== Transport ==
The village is situated near National Highway 37 and connected to nearby towns and cities with regular buses and other modes of transportation.
