= Hemanga Thakuria =

Indian politician

Member of Legislative Assembly Palasbari constituency
- Incumbent
- Assumed office 2021
- Constituency: Palasbari

Personal details
- Born: Assam
- Party: Bharatiya Janata Party
- Education: Gauhati University
- Occupation: Politician

Hemanga Thakuria is a Bharatiya Janata Party politician from the Indian state of Assam. He was elected to the Assam Legislative Assembly in the 2021 election from Palasbari.

== Early life ==
He is the son of Uma Kanta Thakuria and resides in Uparhali, Kamrup district. He earned his Master of Science from Gauhati University in 1998 and obtained his L.L.B degree from the same university in 2006.

== Career ==
He is an advocate and later became a politician. He contested from Palasbari in the 2021 assembly election as BJP candidate and won the seat by securing around 62% votes.
