= Amgaon (Kamrup) =

- Village
- Location in Assam, India Amgaon (India)
- Coordinates: 26.23°N 91.67°E
- Country: India
- State: Assam
- Region: Western Assam
- District: Kamrup

Government
  - Body: Gram panchayat
- Elevation: 51 m (167 ft)

Languages
  - Official: Assamese
- Time zone: UTC+5:30 (IST)
- PIN: 781026
- Vehicle registration: AS
- Website: kamrup.nic.in

Amgaon is a village in Kamrup district, situated on the north bank of the river Brahmaputra River.

== Climate ==
The region has a subtropical climate with warm summers and cold winters. The annual rainfall ranges from 1.5 to 2.6 meters. Low-lying areas close to the Brahmaputra River may experience flooding from May through August.
