= Nagarbera =

- Village
- Location in Assam, India Nagarbera (India)
- Coordinates: 26.11179°N 91.00358°E
- Country: India
- State: Assam
- District: Kamrup

Government
  - Body: Gram panchayat

Languages
  - Official: Assamese
- Time zone: UTC+5:30 (IST)
- PIN: 781127
- Vehicle registration: AS
- Website: kamrup.nic.in

Nagarbera is a suburban town in the Kamrup district of Assam. It is on the south bank of the Brahmaputra River and is 90.6 km from Guwahati city.

Nearby areas are Dhupdhara and Boko. The nearby city is Guwahati.

== Transport ==
Nagarbera is accessible through National Highway 37. It is well connected with Guwahati and other major nearby towns with private commercial vehicles.

== Police Station ==
The newly constructed building of Nagarbera Police Station was inaugurated by Assam Police DPG Bhaskar Jyoti Mahanta on January 27, 2023 virtually. Among others, SP Kamrup Hitesh Chandra Roy, Circle officer Banashree Malakar were present at the newly inaugurated police station during the ceremony. The new building was built at a cost of 1Cr 93L INR.

== Education ==
Established in the year 1972, Bimala Prasad Chahila College (BPCC) is the only higher education institute in the locality. The college is named after the late Chief Minister of Assam Ex-Chief Minister Late Bimala Prasad Chaliha. Apart from Nagarbera region and other parts of the Boko LAC, students from nearby Goalpara and Barpeta district also pursue their higher education from this government college, affiliated to the Gauhati University.

== See also ==
- Guwakuchi
- Dimu Dobak
