= Stakna Monastery =

Buddhist monastery in Ladakh, India

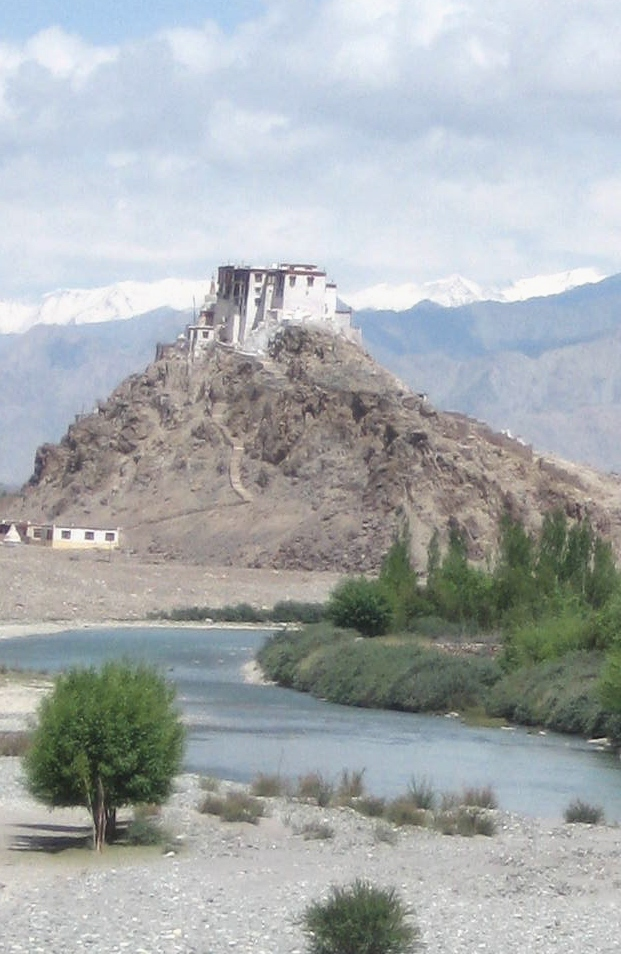
- Stakna

- Location within India

Religion
- Affiliation: Tibetan Buddhism
- Sect: Drugpa

Location
- Location: Stakna, Leh district, Ladakh, India
- Country: India
- Coordinates: 34°0′18″N 77°41′5″E

Architecture
- Completed: Late 16th century

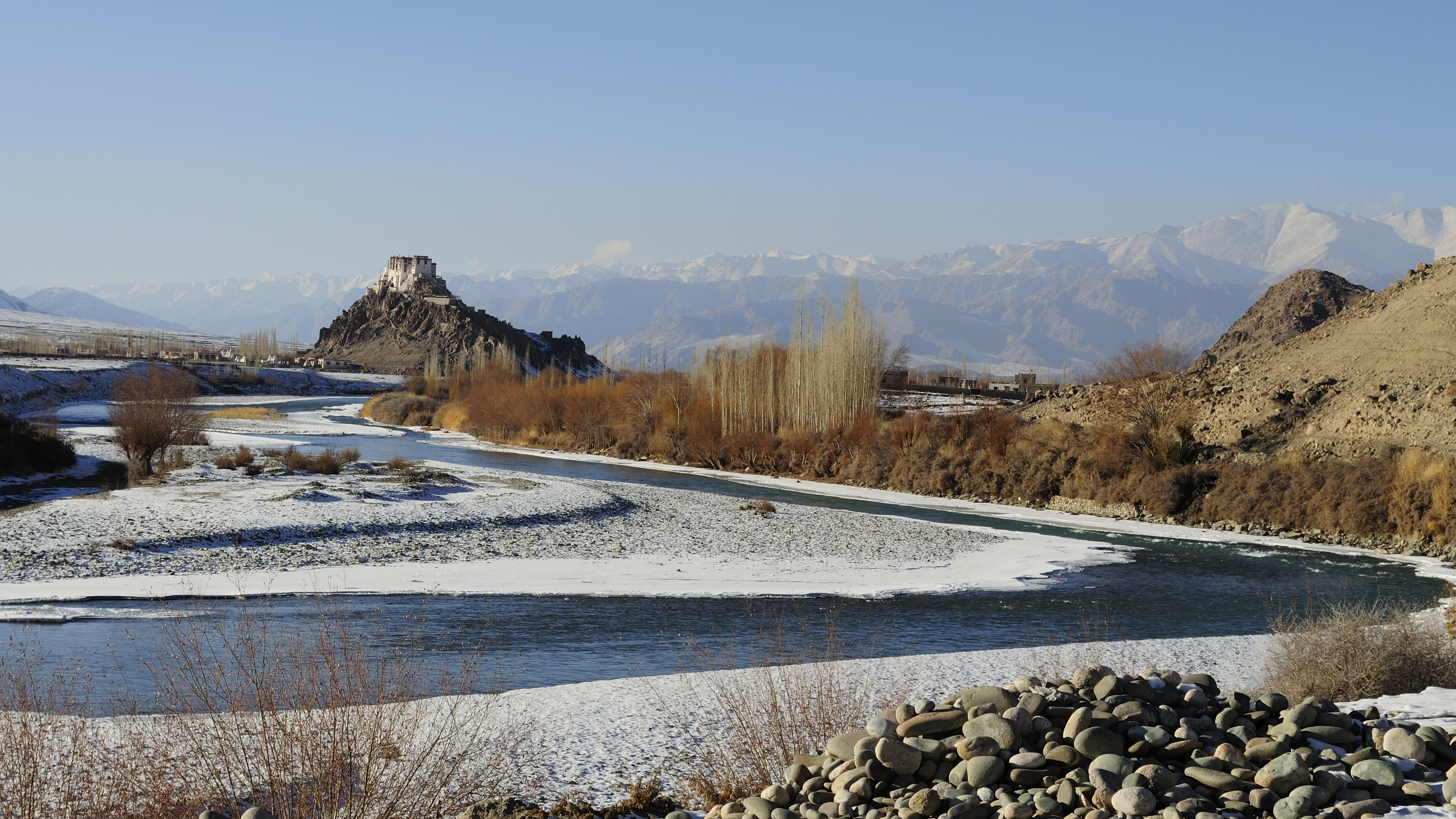
Stakna Monastery from opposite bank of river Indus

Stakna Monastery or Stakna Gompa is a Buddhist monastery of the Drugpa-Kagyu sect in Stakna, Leh district, Ladakh, northern India, 21-25 kilometres from Leh on the left bank of the Indus River.

It was founded in the late 16th century by the Bhutanese scholar-saint Chosje Modzin. Its name, literally meaning 'tiger's nose', was given because it was built on a hill shaped like a tiger's nose. Of note is a sacred Arya Avalokitesvara statue from Kamrup, Assam. Stakna has a residence of approximately 30 monks.

It is the only Bhutanese Drukpa Kagyu monastery in Ladakh, headed by the Je Khenpo in Bhutan, whereas the other Drukpa monasteries in Ladakh are of the Gyalwang Drukpa's school, based at Hemis. This split in the Drukpa Kagyu lineage occurred in the 17th century when there was a dispute over who was the true reincarnation of the 4th Gyalwang Drukpa.

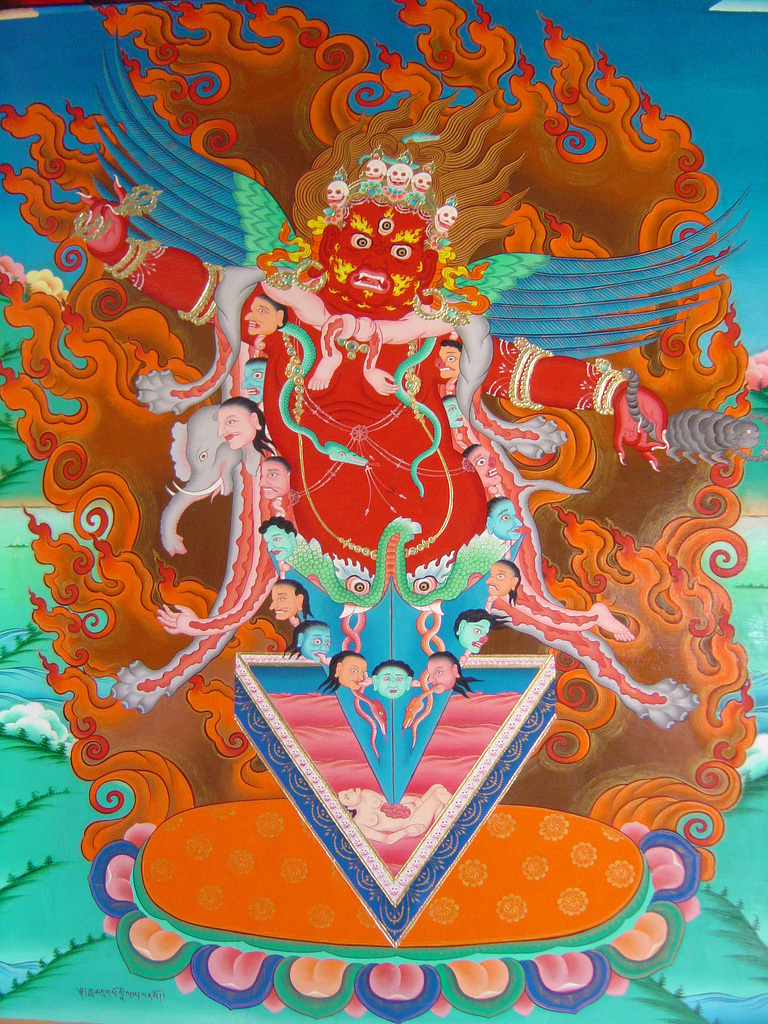
Thangka at Stakna monastery

== See also ==
- List of buddhist monasteries in Ladakh
- Geography of Ladakh
- Tourism in Ladakh
- World Monuments Fund
