= Shunpei Mizuno =

Japanese academic (born 1968)

Shunpei Mizuno (水野俊平, Mizuno Shunpei, born 1968) is a Japanese academic who primarily writes on Korean culture. He has also published instructional books for Korean learners of Japanese. He used to write under the pen name Shunsui Nohira (野平俊水, Nohira Shunsui).

== Early life and education ==
Mizuno was born 1968 in Muroran, Hokkaidō. By his own testimony, he became interested in Korea as a middle school student, after seeing hangul—the Korean writing system—for the first time. He attended Noboribetsu South High School and then Nara Prefecture's Tenri University, where he majored in Korean language; in 1990, he entered into a Ph.D. programme in Korean literature at Chonnam National University in Gwangju, South Korea. After completing his dissertation, he remained at the same university, where he took up a post as a lecturer in 1995. He later earned Ph.D. degree and became a professor in Chonnam National University where he had taught Japanese language to Korean students throughout the years.

== Life in South Korea ==
Professor Mizuno became well known in South Korea for his command of Jeolla dialect and made frequent television and lecture appearances, often speaking about Japanese-Korean relations and the influence of Korea on ancient Japan; he was described as one of the best-known foreigners in South Korea. His pen name was known to the Korean media, and it had been reported as early as 2001 that he had published books critical of Korea, such as his 1996 How to write anti-Japanese novels in Korea or his 2001 Outbreak of a Korea-Japan War?, which he acknowledged took an aggressive approach to their subjects and could be offensive to Koreans; however, he retained popularity as a commentator. He stated that his goal in writing was to help both Japanese and Koreans overcome their historical conflict and develop closer relations. While living there, he married a Korean woman from Jeollabuk-do, with whom he had three sons. In total, he lived in South Korea for 15 years.

== Return to Japan ==
In June 2005, South Korean newspaper Dong-A Ilbo reported more shockingly on the books and essays in which he had submitted under his pen name Nohira, including publications in rightist magazines; those of the works under his pen name were described as "degrading" to Korea, in contrast to those he wrote under his real name. One of the main targets of criticism was his 2002 book Koreans' false history of Japan. A few months later, he returned to Japan to take up a post as a lecturer in Korean language at the Hokkai School of Commerce in Sapporo.

== Publications ==
=== General ===
- Nohira, Shunsui (June 1996). 韓国・反日小説の書き方 [How to write anti-Japan novels in Korea] (in Japanese). Aki Shobō. ISBN 4-7505-9608-6.
- Mizuno, Shunpei (June 2000). 속 터지는 일본인 [Japanese people bursting from inside] (in Korean). Yongnak. ISBN 89-950571-5-7.
- Mizuno, Shunpei (December 2000). 다테마에를 넘어 일본인 속으로 [Beyond tatemae, inside Japanese people] (in Korean). Joheun Chaek Mandeulgi. ISBN 89-89222-07-9.
- Nohira, Shunsui; Ookita, Shōji (November 2001). 韓日戦争勃発!?―韓国けったい本の世界 [Outbreak of a Korea-Japan War?! The bizarre world of Korean books] (in Japanese). Bungeishunjū. ISBN 4-16-357900-1.
- Nohira, Shunsui (April 2002). 韓国人の日本偽史―日本人はビックリ! [Koreans' false history of Japan - Japanese people will be astonished!] (in Japanese). Shogakukan. ISBN 4-09-402716-5.
- Mizuno, Shunpei (March 2003). 한국인을 바보로 만드는 엉터리 책 비판 [A Critique of Lousy Books That Make Fools of Koreans] (in Korean). Aidio. ISBN 89-90001-08-0.
- Mizuno, Shunpei (2003). 韓国の若者を知りたい [I want to know the young people of Korea] (in Japanese). Iwanami Shoten. ISBN 4-00-500433-4.
- Nohira, Shunsui (July 2003). なぜだか韓国でいちばん有名な日本人―私がTVで人気者になった深ーい理由 [Somehow, I became the most famous Japanese person in Korea: The reason I turned into a TV favourite] (in Japanese). Aki Shobō. ISBN 4-7505-0303-7.
- Nohira, Shunsui; Ookita, Shōji (May 2004). 韓国のなかのトンデモ日本人—日本では絶対に見られない、韓国ドラマ・映画・AVの世界 [Korea's outrageous image of Japanese people: The world of Korean TV dramas, movies, and adult videos definitely not seen in Japanv] (in Japanese). Tōkyō: Futabasha. ISBN 4-575-29679-1.
- Mizuno, Shunpei (February 2006). ソウルで学ぼう [Study in Seoul] (in Japanese). Iwanami Shoten. ISBN 4-00-500528-4.
- Mizuno, Shunpei (February 2007). 韓 vs 日「偽史ワールド」 [Korea vs. Japan: world of false history] (in Japanese). Shogakkan. ISBN 978-4-09-387703-9.

=== Academic papers ===
- Mizuno, Shunpei (September 1999). 『日本書紀』에 나타난 한반도 고유명사 표기자의 특이성에 대한 小考 [A Study on specific property of Korean proper nouns in 'Nihonshoki']. Ilboneo Munhak (in Korean). 7: 97–116.
- Mizuno, Shunpei (September 2001). 『日本書紀』 고대 한국어 차자 표기의 특징에 대한 고찰 － 특히 音假名의 聲母 分布를 중심으로 [A Study on specific property of ancient Korean borrowed notation]. Ilboneo Munhak (in Korean). 11: 45–68.
- Mizuno, Shunpei (March 2005). 『古事記』의 音假名 小考 - ‘カ’, ‘ニ’의 표기에 쓰인 音假名 분포에 대해 [A Study of ancient borrowed notation system in Kojiki - Especially focused on 'ka' and 'ni']. Ilboneo Munhak (in Korean). 24: 3–16.

=== Language instruction ===
- Mizuno, Shunpei (March 2002). 미즈노 선생님과 함께 일본어 급소찌르기 [Get to the Vital Points of Japanese with Mizuno-Sensei] (in Korean). Munyerim. ISBN 89-7482-191-5.
- Mizuno, Shunpei (August 2002). 미즈노 선생의 액션 일본어 회화 2 [Mizuno-Sensei's Action Japanese Conversation 2] (in Korean). J Plus. ISBN 89-92215-20-7.
- Mizuno, Shunpei (August 2002). 미즈노 선생의 동시통역 일본어회화사전 [Mizuno-Sensei's Simultaneous Interpretation Japanese Conversation Dictionary] (in Korean). J Plus. ISBN 89-88701-31-3.
- Mizuno, Shunpei (March 2000). 일본어작문 플러스 [Japanese-language Composition Plus] (in Korean). J Plus. ISBN 89-88701-10-0.
- Mizuno, Shunpei (September 2004). Action Japanese. J Plus. ISBN 89-88701-65-8.
- Mizuno, Shunpei (August 2005). 미즈노의 120분 일문법 [Mizuno's 120-minute Japanese Grammar] (in Korean). Nexus Japanese. ISBN 89-91795-01-3.
- Mizuno, Shunpei (October 2006). 현지에서 바로 통하는 일본어 회화표현 500 [500 Japanese conversational expressions you can use right away] (in Korean). Nexus Japanese. ISBN 89-91795-77-3.
