= Kanika (name) =

Female given name

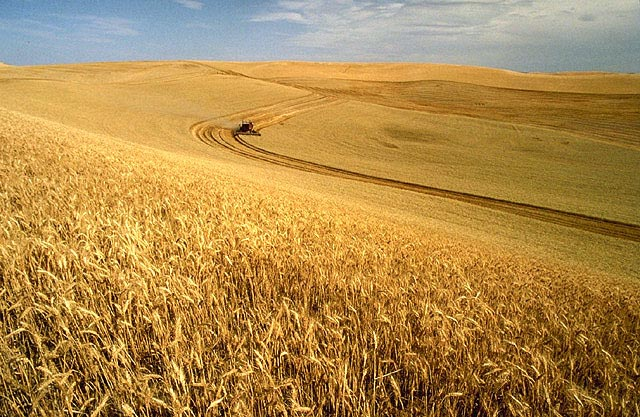
- Kanika means seed of wheat in Hindi
- Pronunciation: /kʌnɪkɑː/
- Gender: Female
- Language: Sanskrit

Origin
- Meaning: Atom, Seed, Piece of Gold, the colour gold and jeera
- Region of origin: India

Other names
- Derived: Kana, Kanaka
- Related names: Kanaka, Kanak

Kanika (sanskrit, कनिका) is a Sanskrit Indian feminine name, often found in the Hindu and Jain communities. It means "atom", "seed" or "gold". It also means something that is similar to the colour of a wheat grain, essentially golden.

== Etymology ==
The word Kanika has multiple origins. It may mean one of the following:

- Atom, when derived from Kana(Sanskrit: ‍कण), Sanskrit word for atom.
- Seed, when derived from Kanaka(Hindi: ‍कनक), Hindi word for seed of wheat.
- Gold, when derived from Kanaka(Sanskrit: ‍कणक), Sanskrit word for gold.

== Religious significance ==
The word is mostly found in Hindu religion. It is also found in Buddhism and Jainism. The zodiac sign usually associated with Kanika is Gemini.

== Notable people named Kanika ==
- Kanika Banerjee, (born 1924 – died 2000), Indian Rabindra Sangeet musician and singer.
- Kanika Beckles, (born 1991), Grenadian sprinter
- Kanika Dhillon, Indian novelist and screenplay writer
- Kanika Kapoor, (born 1978), Indian actress and playback singer
- Kanika Maheshwari, (born 1981), Indian television actress
- Kanika Shivpuri, Indian television and film actress
- Kanika Subramaniam or Kaniha or Divya Venkatasubramaniam (born 1982), Indian film actress
