= Hokkai School of Commerce =

Private university in Japan

Coordinates: 43.04824°N 141.36956°E

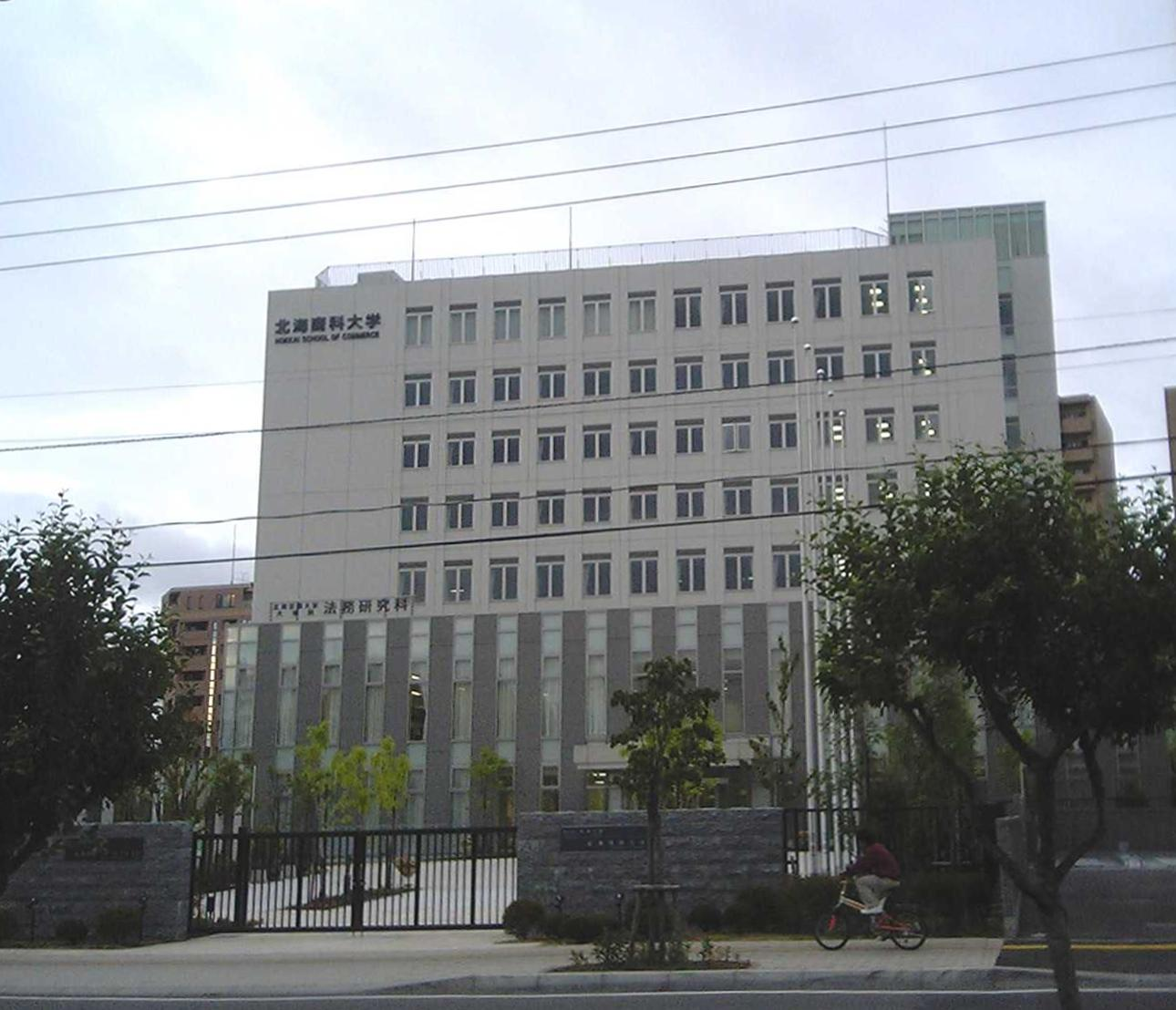
Hokkai School of Commerce

Hokkai School of Commerce (北海商科大学, Hokkai Shōka Daigaku) is a private university in Toyohira-ku, Sapporo, Hokkaido, Japan. It was originally set up in 1977 as the Commerce Faculty of the Kitami campus of Hokkai Gakuen University; it was spun off as a separate university in April 2006, at which point it moved to Sapporo. The school has exchange student agreements with Shandong University and Yantai University in China, Daejeon University in South Korea, and the University of Lethbridge in Canada.

== Notable students and faculty ==
- Shunpei Mizuno, author, lecturer in Korean language
