= Soneswar =

- Village
- Location in Assam, India Soneswar (India)
- Coordinates: 26.34°N 91.65°E
- Country: India
- State: Assam
- Region: Western Assam
- District: Kamrup

Government
  - Body: Gram panchayat
- Elevation: 42 m (138 ft)

Languages
  - Official: Assamese
- Time zone: UTC+5:30 (IST)
- PIN: 781382
- Vehicle registration: AS
- Website: kamrup.nic.in

Soneswar is a village in Kamrup rural district, situated near north bank of river Brahmaputra.

== Transport ==
The village is located near of National Highway 31.

== See also ==
- Amingaon
- Guwakuchi
