= Dubravko Tešević =

Bosnian footballer

Personal information
- Date of birth: December 18, 1981 (age 44)
- Place of birth: Foča, SFR Yugoslavia
- Height: 1.86 m (6 ft 1 in)
- Position: Midfielder

Senior career*
| Years | Team | Apps | (Gls) |
| 1998–1999 | SAK Klagenfurt | | |
| 1999–2001 | DSV Leoben | | |
| 2001–2005 | First Vienna | 88 | (16) |
| 2005 | Livingston | 4 | (0) |
| 2006 | Ried | 1 | (0) |
| 2006 | SC-ESV Parndorf | 6 | (0) |
| 2007–2008 | União da Madeira | 5 | (1) |
| 2009 | SC Ostbahn XI | 15 | (2) |
| 2009–2013 | Gratkorn | 104 | (29) |
| 2013–2014 | SC Kalsdorf | 10 | (0) |

International career
- Bosnia U21
- * Club domestic league appearances and goals

Dubravko "Dubi" Tešević (born December 18, 1981, in Foča, SR Bosnia and Herzegovina) is a Bosnian former professional footballer who played as a midfielder.

He has played the large part of his career in the Austrian leagues.
