= Dakhala =

- village
- Location in Kamrup, India Dakhala (India)
- Coordinates: 26.116°N 91.498°E
- Country: India
- State: Assam
- District: Kamrup
- Elevation: 46 m (151 ft)

Population (2011)
  - Total: 4,049

Languages
- Time zone: UTC+5:30 (IST)
- PIN: 781112
- Vehicle registration: AS

Dakhala is a town in Kamrup district of Assam, situated on the south bank of the Brahmaputra River.

== See also ==
- Bijoynagar City
