= Saukuchi =

Coordinates: 26°17′N 91°57′E

Saukuchi is a locality in southern part of Guwahati surrounded by Lokhra and Ghoramara localities. This locality serves as secondary route which connects Beltola with Lokhra area, the other being National Highway 37. It is predominantly a residential area and has less commercial importance.

== Transport ==
The locality is near National Highway 37, and acts as quick transit route for some parts of city areas.

== See also ==
- Bhetapara
- Basistha
