= Topatali =

- Village
- Location in Assam, India Topatali (India)
- Coordinates: 26.10°N 91.16°E
- Country: India
- State: Assam
- Region: Western Assam
- District: Kamrup Metropolitan

Government
  - Body: Gram panchayat

Languages
  - Official: Assamese
- Time zone: UTC+5:30 (IST)
- PIN: 782403
- Vehicle registration: AS
- Website: kamrup.nic.in

Topatali is a village in Kamrup Metropolitan district, situated in south bank of river Brahmaputra.

== Transport ==
The village is near National Highway 37 and connected to nearby towns and cities with regular buses and other modes of transportation. Nearest Railway Station is Jagiroad (5 KM) and the nearest airport is Lokpriya Gopinath Bordoloi International Airport (70 KM).

== See also ==
- Tupamari
- Tukrapara
