= Dimu Dobak =

- Village
- Location in Assam, India Dimu Dobak (India)
- Coordinates: 26.0802867°N 91.5596117°E
- Country: India
- State: Assam
- District: Kamrup

Government
  - Body: Gram panchayat

Languages
  - Official: Assamese
- Time zone: UTC+5:30 (IST)
- Vehicle registration: AS
- Website: kamrup.nic.in

Dimu Dobak is a village in Kamrup district. It is 30.9 km from Guwahati.

== Transport ==
Dimu Dobak is accessible through National Highway 31. All major private commercial vehicles ply between Dimu Dobak and nearby towns.

== Education ==
Tulsibari Boys Higher Secondary School, Sidhi Nath Sarma High School and Sirdartha Sankar High School are few of various schools located in Dimu Dobak.

== See also ==
- Guwakuchi
- Batsor
