= Rani, Kamrup =

Rani
- Village
- Location in Assam, India Rani (India)
- Coordinates: 25.80°N 91.27°E
- Country: India
- State: Assam
- Region: Western Assam
- District: Kamrup

Government
  - Body: Gram panchayat

Languages
  - Official: Assamese
- Time zone: UTC+5:30 (IST)
- PIN: 781131
- Vehicle registration: AS
- Website: kamrup.nic.in

Rani is a village located in Kamrup rural district, within the Paschim Guwahati area.

== Transport ==
The village can be accessed via National Highway 37 and is connected to nearby towns and cities through regular bus services and other transportation options.

== See also ==
- Natun Batabari
