= Kamalpur, Assam =

Kamalpur
- Town
- Location in Assam, India Kamalpur (India)
- Coordinates: 26.40°N 91.46°E
- Country: India
- State: Assam
- District: Kamrup

Languages
  - Official: Assamese
- Time zone: UTC+5:30 (IST)
- PIN: 781380
- ISO 3166 code: IN-AS
- Vehicle registration: AS-01
- Website: kamrup.nic.in

Kamalpur is a town in Kamrup Rural district, Assam, India. It is 32 km from Jalukbari, Guwahati and surrounded by Rangia city. Baihata Chariali Kaniha, and Dimu Dobak villages. It is also a constituency of the Assam Legislative Assembly.

== See also ==
- Rangia
- Nalbari
- Baihata Chariali
- Guwahati
