= Uzankuri =

- Village
- Location in Assam, India Uzankuri (India)
- Coordinates: 26.20°N 91.49°E
- Country: India
- State: Assam
- Region: Western Assam
- District: Kamrup

Government
  - Body: Gram panchayat
- Elevation: 42 m (138 ft)

Languages
  - Official: Assamese
- Time zone: UTC+5:30 (IST)
- PIN: 781102
- ISO 3166 code: IN-AS
- Vehicle registration: AS
- Website: kamrup.nic.in

Uzankuri is a village in Kamrup rural district, situated in south bank of river Brahmaputra.

== Transport ==
The village is near National Highway 37 and connected to nearby towns and cities with regular buses and other modes of transportation.

== See also ==
- Villages of Nalbari District
- Ramdia
