= Kanik, Iran =

Kanik كانيك
- Village
- Location within Iran
- Coordinates: 32°32′08″N 59°48′50″E
- Country: Iran
- Province: South Khorasan
- County: Sarbisheh
- Bakhsh: Central
- Rural District: Momenabad

Population (2006)
  - Total: 35
- Time zone: UTC+3:30 (IRST)
  - Summer (DST): UTC+4:30 (IRDT)

Kanik (Persian: كانيك, also Romanized as Kānīk and Kanek; also known as Kahanak) is a village in Momenabad Rural District, in the Central District of Sarbisheh County, South Khorasan Province, Iran. At the 2006 census, its population was 35, in 10 families.
