= Kamrup district =

- District of Assam
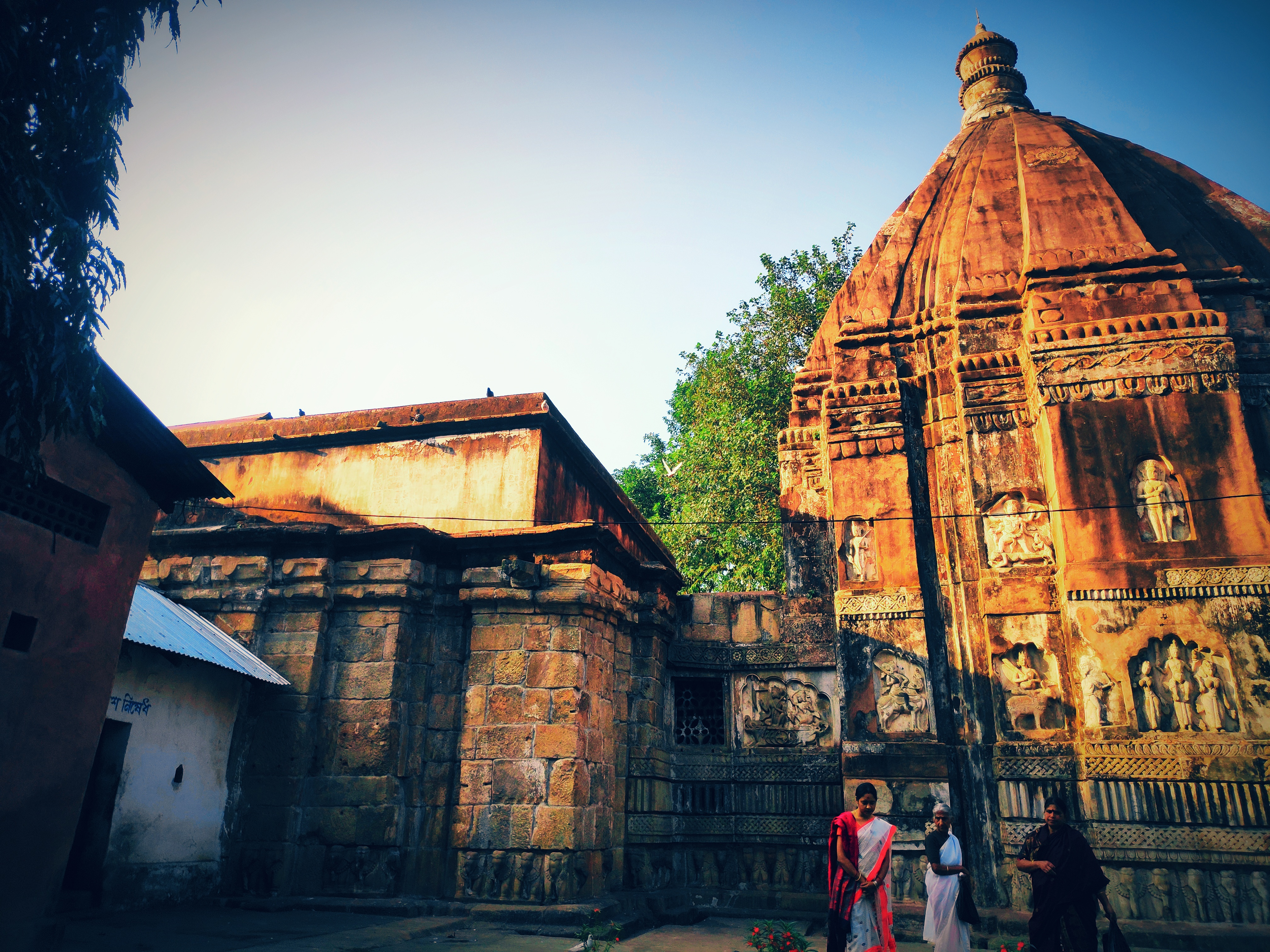
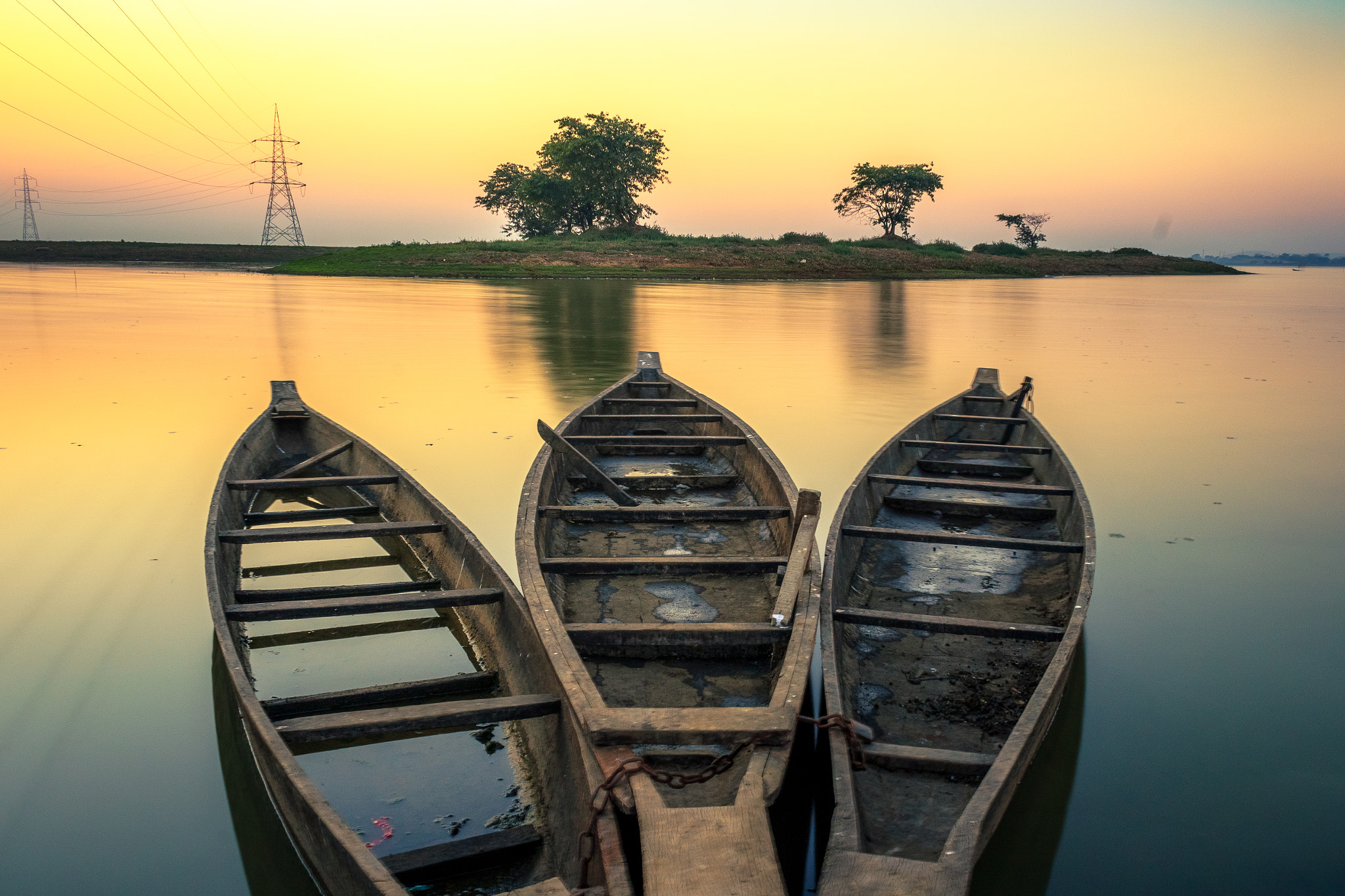
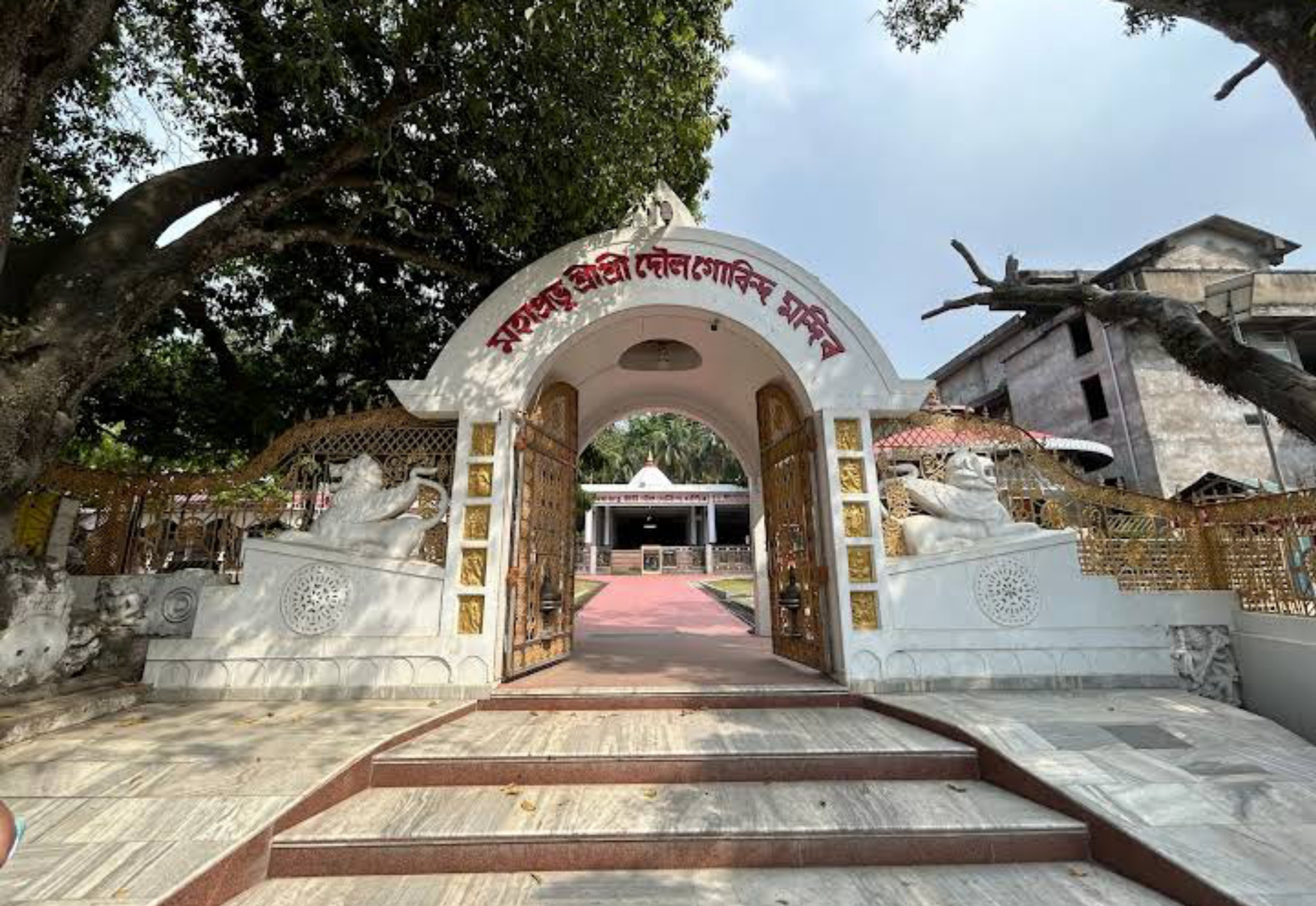
- Hayagriva Madhava Temple Dipor Beel Doul Govinda Temple
- Interactive map of Kamrup district
- Coordinates (Rangiya): 26.47°N 91.63°E
- Country: India
- State: Assam
- Division: Lower Assam
- Sub-districts: Rangiya
- Headquarters: Amingaon,(North Guwahati)

Government
  - Lok Sabha constituencies: Gauhati, Darrang Udalguri
  - Vidhan Sabha constituencies: Boko–Chaygaon, Palasbari, Hajo–Sualkuchi, Rangiya, Kamalpur

Area
  - Total: 3,105 km^{2} (1,199 sq mi)

Population (2011)
  - Total: 1,517,542
  - Density: 488.7/km^{2} (1,266/sq mi)
  - Urban: 142,394

Demographics
  - Literacy: 70.95%
  - Sex ratio: 914
- Time zone: UTC+05:30 (IST)
- Major highways: National Highway 31, National Highway 37, National Highway 127D, National Highway 15
- Average annual precipitation: 1,400 mm
- Website: kamrup.assam.gov.in

Kamrup district (/ˈkæmˌrəp/ or /ˈkæmˌruːp/), is an administrative district in the state of Assam in India formed by dividing the old Kamrup district into two in the year 2003; other being Kamrup Metropolitan district, named after the region it constitutes. This district, along with Nalbari, Barpeta, Kamrup Metropolitan, Bajali and Baksa districts has been created from the Undivided Kamrup district. Rangiya is the Sub-District of Kamrup. The present Kamrup district has its headquarters at Amingaon,(North Guwahati).

== History ==
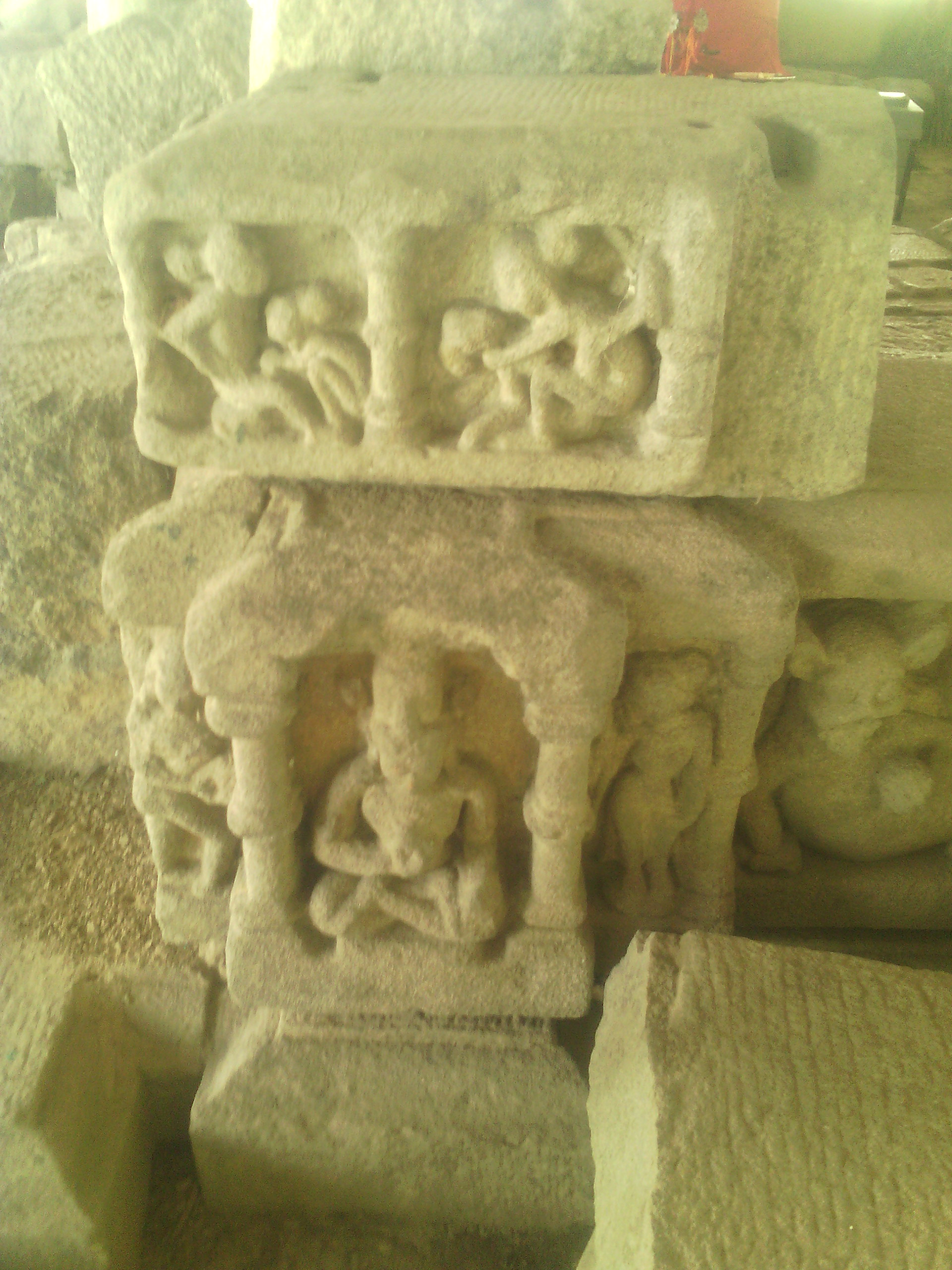
Madan Kamdev

Kamrup Rural district was created by bifurcating Undivided Kamrup district in 2003.

The Government of Assam, during the Chief-ministership of Late Tarun Gogoi, had proposed to bifurcate it further and create a new district, named South Kamrup. In 2016, the process of creation of the district was started. However, later that year, the process of creation was stopped midway due to lack of infrastructure.

== Geography and environment ==
=== Overview ===
Kamrup district occupies an area of 4,345 square kilometres (1,678 sq mi). Kamrup district has some territorial disputes with neighbouring West Khasi Hills district, Meghalaya, including that over the village of Langpih.

=== Hydrography ===
In the immediate neighborhood of the Brahmaputra, the land is low and exposed to annual inundation. In this marshy tract reeds and canes flourish luxuriantly, and the only cultivation is that of rice. At a comparatively short distance from the river banks the ground begins to rise in undulating knolls towards the mountains of Bhutan on the north, and towards the Khasi hills on the south. The hills south of the Brahmaputra in some parts reach the height of 800 feet (240 m). The Brahmaputra, which divides the district into two nearly equal portions, is navigable by river steamers throughout the year, and receives several tributaries navigable by large native boats in the rainy season. The chief of these are the Manas, Chaul Khoya and Barnadi on the north, and the Kulsi and Dibru on the south bank.

=== Flora and fauna ===
In 1989 Kamrup district became home to the Dipor Bil Wildlife Sanctuary, which has an area of 4.1 km^{2} (1.6 mi^{2}). There is also a plantation where seedlings of teak, sal, sissu, sum, and nahor are reared, and experiments are being made with the caoutchouc tree.

Kamrup is home to one of the few large colonies of greater adjutant storks still in existence. The villagers previously regarded the birds as pests, but outreach efforts including cultural and religious programming, especially aimed at local women, have rallied Kamrup residents to be proud of and protect the storks.

== Demographics ==
Historical population
Year	Pop.	±% p.a.
1901	273,945	—
1911	304,339	+1.06%
1921	325,816	+0.68%
1931	356,369	+0.90%
1941	424,814	+1.77%
1951	497,763	+1.60%
1961	598,357	+1.86%
1971	804,775	+3.01%
1991	1,091,651	+1.54%
2001	1,311,698	+1.85%
2011	1,517,542	+1.47%

According to the 2011 census Kamrup district has a population of 1,517,542, roughly equal to the West African country of Gabon or the US state of Hawaii. This gives it a ranking of 327th in India (out of a total of 640). The district has a population density of 436 inhabitants per square kilometre (1,130/sq mi) . Its population growth rate over the decade 2001-2011 was 15.67%. Kamrup has a sex ratio of 946 females for every 1000 males, and a literacy rate of 72.81%. Scheduled Castes and Scheduled Tribes made up 7.11% and 12.00% of the population respectively.

=== Religion ===
Religion in Kamrup district (2011)
Religion	Percent
Hinduism	57.82%
Islam	39.66%
Christianity	2.19%
Other or not stated	0.33%

Population of circles by religion
Circle	Hindus	Muslims	Christians	Others
Rangia (Pt)	63.06%	36.30%	0.12%	0.52%
Koya	59.21%	40.60%	0.07%	0.12%
Kamalpur	74.01%	25.51%	0.17%	0.31%
Hajo	55.92%	43.68%	0.06%	0.34%
Chhaygaon	77.54%	13.73%	8.27%	0.46%
Goroimari	6.46%	93.31%	0.05%	0.18%
Chamaria	15.61%	84.28%	0.07%	0.04%
Nagarbera	25.59%	74.28%	0.07%	0.06%
Boko	77.59%	7.07%	15.17%	0.17%
Palasbari	83.93%	13.90%	1.57%	0.60%
North Guwahati (Pt)	67.93%	28.41%	3.40%	0.26%
Goreswar (Pt)	66.57%	33.26%	0.04%	0.13%

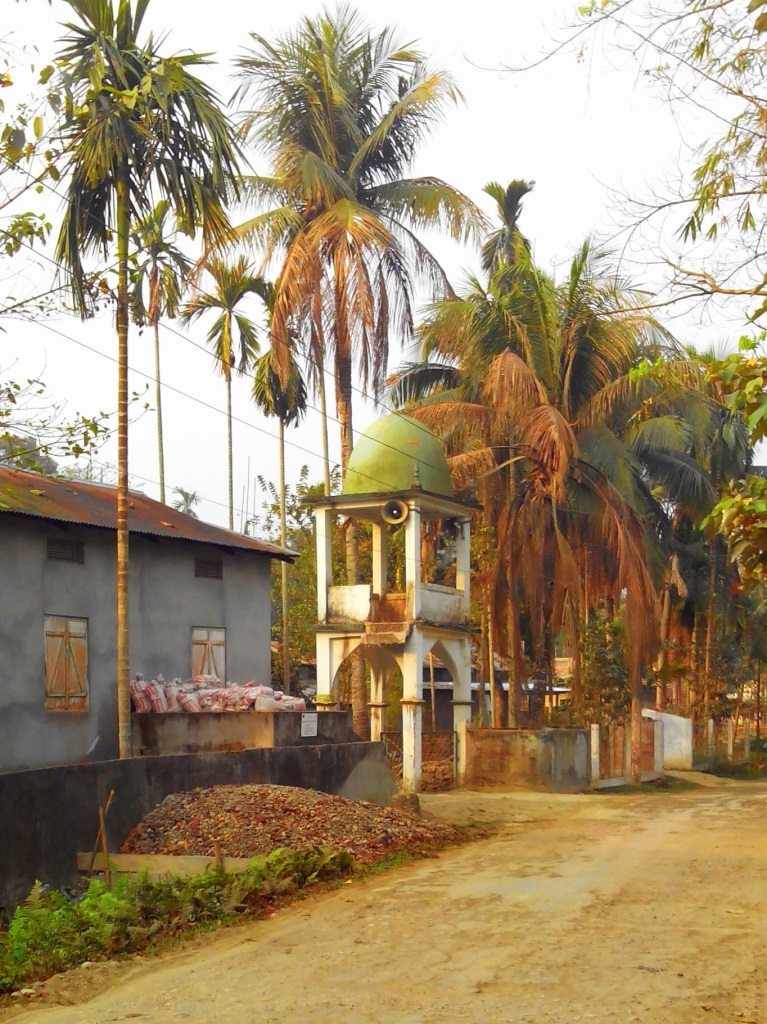
The Chanmaguri Mosque near Rangiya, Kamrup.

The religious composition of the district includes Hinduism (877,495) 57.82% majority, second most popular is Islam numbering (601,784) constituting 39.66% of the region and rest 2.52% include others religions like Sikhism, Christianity, Buddhism, Jainism and indigenous tribal religions according to census 2011 report. The district has people belonging to various indigenous Assamese communities like Keots/Kaibarta, Bodo, Rabha, Tiwa/Lalung, Amri Karbi, Dom/Nadiyal, Koch-Rajbongshi etc.

=== Religious important places ===
The district has followers of Hinduism, Islam, Christianity, Buddhism and Animism. The ancient temples of Kamakhya and Hajo attracts many pilgrims from all quarters. The people of Kamrup also donated a sacred Arya Avalokiteśvara statue to Stakna Monastery in Ladakh.

=== Language ===
Languages of Kamrup district (2011)
1. Assamese (74.4%)
2. Bengali (19.9%)
3. Garo (1.86%)
4. Boro (1.41%)
5. Hindi (1.17%)
6. Others (1.23%)

According to the 2011 census, 74.43% of the population spoke Assamese, 19.90% Bengali, 1.86% Garo, 1.41% Boro and 1.17% Hindi as their first language.

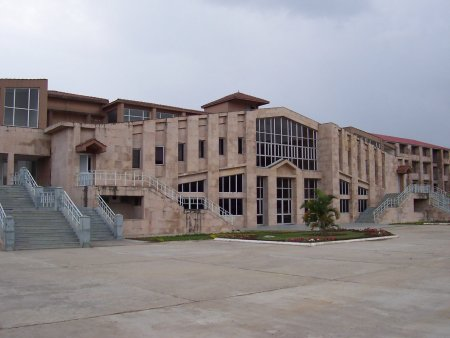
Indian Institute of Technology in North Gauhati

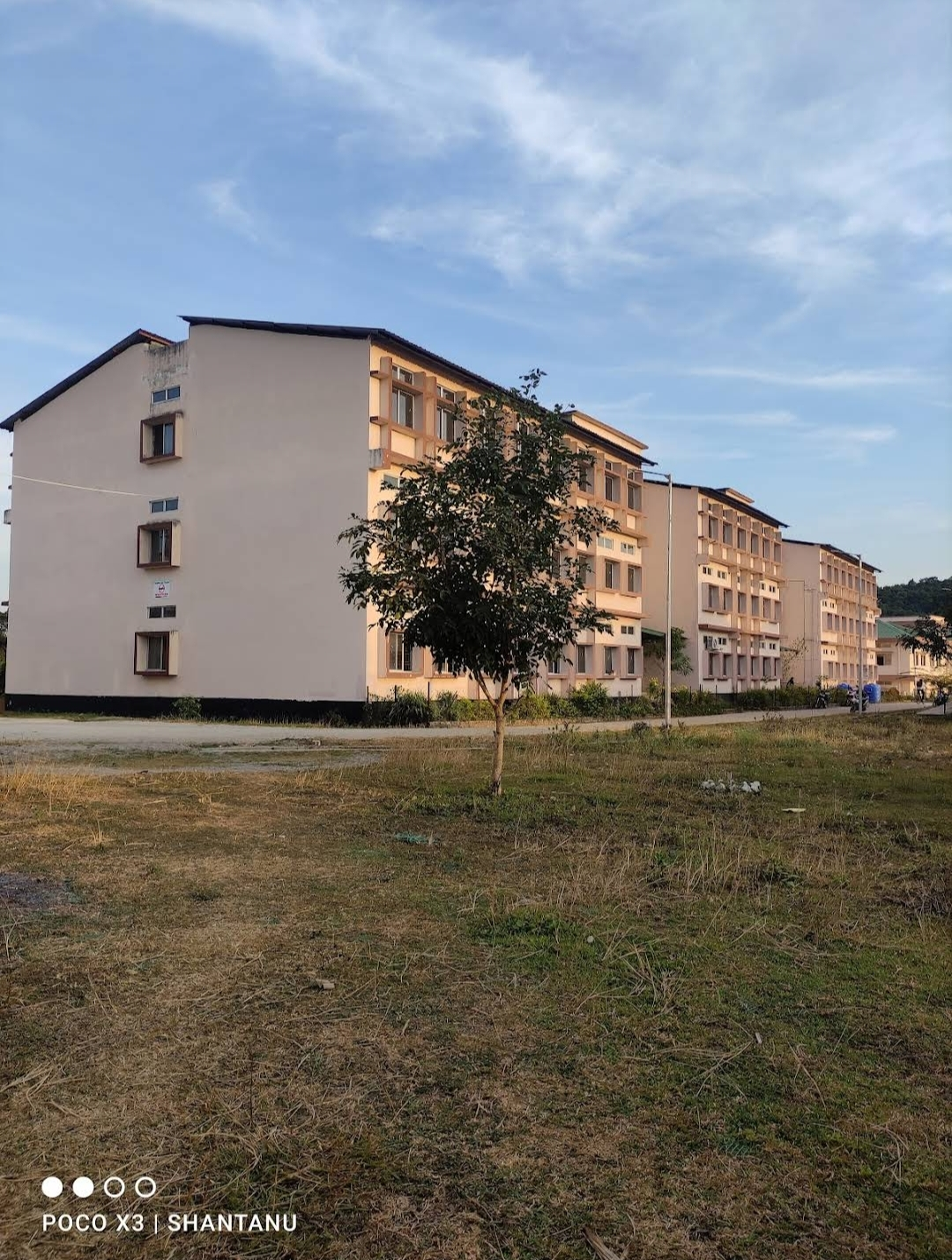
Kamrup Polytechnic in Baihata Chariali

== Villages ==
- Amranga
- Hahara
- Hatipara
- Chamaria Satra
- Kahibari pathar

== See also ==
- Silsako
- Madan Kamdev
- Kamrup region
- Hajo
- Bamun Sualkuchi

== Bibliography ==
- Bannerje, A C (1992). "Chapter 1: The New Regime, 1826-31". In Barpujari, H K (ed.). The Comprehensive History of Assam: Modern Period. Vol. IV. Guwahati: Publication Board, Assam. pp. 1–43.
- Hunter, William Wislon (1879). A Statistical Account of Assam. Vol. 1. Trübner & co.
