= Bhanita Das =

Indian actress

- Born: Chhaygaon, Assam
- Occupation: Actress
- Known for: Village Rockstars
- Awards: National Film Award for Best Child Artist

Bhanita Das is an Indian actress who works in Assamese language films. She is known for her role as Dhunu in the 2017 drama Village Rockstars that won many awards including four National Film Awards. The film was also selected as India's official entry to the 91st Academy Awards. Bhanita is a recipient of the National Film Award for Best Child Artist.

== Personal life ==
Bhanita was born in Chhaygaon, Assam. She is an elementary school girl and lives with her widowed mother who does farming to make end meets. Bhanita is the younger sister of Mallika Das, who is pursuing degree in Chaygaon and was given an opportunity to assist Village Rockstars' director Rima Das.

== Village Rockstars ==
Bhanita was signed by Rima Das to play the lead role. In this film she has played Dhunnu, a ten-year-old girl who is on the lookout for an electric guitar in her village so that she can start a rock band of her own with friends. She also appeared in the sequel of the film titled as Village Rockstars 2, which premiered at the 29th Busan International Film Festival on 4 October 2024 and competed in Kim Jiseok section.

== Awards ==
Year	Film	Awards	Category	Result	Ref.
2018	Village Rockstars	65th National Film Awards	Best Child Artist	Won	
