= Bulbul Can Sing =

2018 film

- Film poster
- Directed by: Rima Das
- Written by: Rima Das
- Produced by: Flying River Films
- Cinematography: Rima Das
- Edited by: Rima Das
- Music by: Dotora; Kabindra Patowary
- Release dates: 7 September 2018 (TIFF); 20 September 2019 (India)
- Running time: 95 minutes
- Country: India
- Language: Assamese

Bulbul Can Sing is a 2018 Indian Assamese-language drama film directed by Rima Das. It was screened in the Contemporary World Cinema section at the 2018 Toronto International Film Festival. The film centres on three teenagers trying to come to terms with their sexual identities. The film won the National Film Award for Best Feature Film in Assamese at India's 66th National Film Awards.

== Plot ==
Bulbul is a young girl who lives in Kalardiya village near Chaygaon in India's Assam state. She has two best friends, Bonny and Sumu, and they are coming of age and finding their own identities. Who they want to be and what their community expects them to be are two different things as they find themselves at odds with the social mores and moral codes of their village. Clashes emerge as Bulbul finds herself experiencing the first glimmers of attraction for a guy, Sumu is bullied for not acting like a traditional man and Bonny finds the pressures of the community unbearable. As fear and doubt assail the three friends, Bulbul must find her own voice and sing.

== Cast ==
- Arnali Das as Bulbul
- Banita Thakuriya as Bonnie
- Manoranjan Das as Suman
- Manabendra Das
- Pakija Begam

== Reception ==
=== Critical response ===
Bulbul Can Sing mostly received positive reviews from critics. Deborah Young of The Hollywood Reporter called the film "quietly insightful" which "has a pleasing simplicity and realism", while Wendy Ide of Screen described it as "a heartfelt, acutely honest portrait of rural Indian adolescence."

Among Indian critics, Anirudh Bhattacharyya of Outlook felt that with this film director Das had surpassed the expectations raised by her previous directorial Village Rockstars. According to Sonal Pandya of Cinestaan, Das has matured as a filmmaker with this film and the film's beginning and end were bookended nicely. Aswathy Gopalakrishnan also praised the film for its subtle take on feminism and patriarchy.

=== Accolades ===
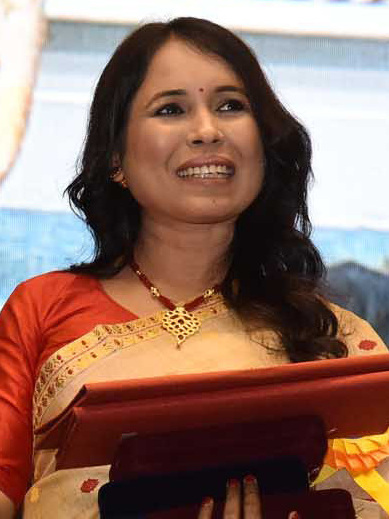
Bulbul Can Sing director Rima Das in 2018

Festival or Award	Category	Recipient(s)/nominee(s)	Result	Ref(s)
66th National Film Awards	Best Feature Film in Assamese	Bulbul Can Sing	Won	
Jio MAMI Film Festival 2018: Golden Gateway	India Gold	Bulbul Can Sing	Won	
29th Singapore International Film Festival: Silver Screen Award	Best Asian Feature Film	Bulbul Can Sing	Nominated	
29th Singapore International Film Festival: Silver Screen Award	Best Performance - Asian Feature Film	Manoranjan Das	Won	
2019 Berlin International Film Festival	Special Mention - Generation 14plus	Bulbul Can Sing	Won	
13th Asian Film Awards 2019	Best New Director	Rima Das	Nominated	
2019 Dublin International Film Festival	Best Director	Rima Das	Won	
2019 Osaka Asian Film Festival	Jury Special Mention	Bulbul Can Sing	Won	
2019 New York Indian Film Festival	Best Director	Rima Das	Nominated	
Prag Cine Awards 2019	Best Film	Bulbul Can Sing	Won	
Prag Cine Awards 2019	Best Actor (Female)	Anjali Das	Won	
Prag Cine Awards 2019	Best Actor (Male)	Monoranjan Das	Won	
Prag Cine Awards 2019	Best Cinematography	Rima Das	Won	
Prag Cine Awards 2019	Global Icon Award	Rima Das	Won	
2019 Indian Film Festival of Melbourne	Best Indie Film	Bulbul Can Sing	Won	
10th Jagran Film Festival	Best Director	Rima Das	Won	
