= 65th National Film Awards =

Film awards in India

- Awarded for: Best of Indian cinema in 2017
- Awarded by: Directorate of Film Festivals
- Presented by: Ram Nath Kovind (President of India)
- Announced on: 13 April 2018
- Presented on: 3 May 2018
- Official website: dff.nic.in

Highlights
- Best Feature Film: Village Rockstars
- Best Non-Feature Film: Not awarded
- Best Book: Matmagi Manipur: The first Manipuri Feature Film
- Best Film Critic: Giridhar Jha
- Dadasaheb Phalke Award: Vinod Khanna
- Most awards: • Nagarkirtan • Village Rockstars (4)

The 65th National Film Awards ceremony was an event during which the Directorate of Film Festivals presented its annual National Film Awards to honour the best films of 2017 in Indian cinema. The awards were announced on 13 April 2018. The award ceremony was held on 3 May 2018.

== Selection process ==
The Directorate of Film Festivals invited online entries and the acceptable last date for entries was until 2 March 2018. Feature and Non-Feature Films certified by the Central Board of Film Certification between 1 January 2017, and 31 December 2017, were eligible for the film award categories. Books, critical studies, reviews or articles on cinema published in Indian newspapers, magazines, and journals between 1 January 2017, and 31 December 2017, were eligible for the best writing on cinema section. Entries of dubbed, revised or copied versions of a film or translation, abridgements, edited or annotated works and reprints were ineligible for the awards.

For the Feature and Non-Feature Films sections, films in any Indian language, shot on 16 mm, 35 mm, a wider film gauge or a digital format, and released in cinemas, on video or digital formats for home viewing were eligible. Films were required to be certified as a feature film, a featurette or a Documentary/Newsreel/Non-Fiction by the Central Board of Film Certification.

== Dadasaheb Phalke Award ==
Introduced in 1969, the Dadasaheb Phalke Award is the highest award given to recognise the contributions of film personalities towards the development of Indian cinema and for distinguished contributions to the medium, its growth and promotion."

A committee consisting of five eminent personalities from the Indian film industry was appointed to evaluate the lifetime achievement award, Dadasaheb Phalke Award.

Name of Award	Image	Awardee(s)	Awarded As	Awards
Dadasaheb Phalke Award		Vinod Khanna (Posthumously)	Actor	Shadan Azeez, ₹1 million (US$10,000) and a shawl

== Feature film ==
=== All India Awards ===
==== Golden Lotus Award ====
Official Name: Swarna Kamal

All awardees were awarded with the 'Golden Lotus Award (Swarna Kamal)', a certificate and cash prize.

Name of Award	Name of Film	Language	Awardee(s)	Cash prize
Best Feature Film	Village Rockstars	Assamese	Producer and Director: Rima Das	₹ 250,000/- Each
Best Debut Film of a Director	Sinjar	Jasari	Producer: Shibu G. Suseelan; Director: Pampally	₹ 125,000/- Each
Best Popular Film Providing Wholesome Entertainment	Baahubali 2: The Conclusion	Telugu	Producer: Prasad Devineni; Director: S. S. Rajamouli	₹ 200,000/- Each
Best Children's Film	Mhorkya	Marathi	Producer: Kalyan Rajmogli Padal; Director: Amar Bharat Deokar	₹ 150,000/- Each
Best Direction	Bhayanakam	Malayalam	Jayaraj	₹ 250,000/-

==== Silver Lotus Award ====
Official Name: Rajat Kamal

All awardees were awarded with the 'Silver Lotus Award (Rajat Kamal)', a certificate and cash prize.

Name of Award	Name of Film	Language	Awardee(s)	Cash prize
Best Feature Film on National Integration	Dhappa	Marathi	Producer: Sumatilal Popatlal Shah; Director: Nipun Dharmadhikari	₹ 150,000/- Each
Best Film on Other Social Issues	Aalorukkam	Malayalam	Producer: Jolly Lonappan; Director: V. C. Abhilash	₹ 150,000/- Each
Best Film on Environment/Conservation/Preservation	Irada	Hindi	Producer: Irada Entertainment; Director: Aparnaa Singh	₹ 150,000/- Each
Best Actor	Nagarkirtan	Bengali	Riddhi Sen	₹ 50,000/-
Best Actress	Mom	Hindi	Sridevi (Posthumously)	₹ 50,000/-
Best Supporting Actor	Thondimuthalum Driksakshiyum	Malayalam	Fahadh Faasil	₹ 50,000/-
Best Supporting Actress	Irada	Hindi	Divya Dutta	₹ 50,000/-
Best Child Artist	Village Rockstars	Assamese	Bhanita Das	₹ 50,000/-
Best Male Playback Singer	Viswasapoorvam Mansoor (For the song "Poy Maranja Kalam")	Malayalam	K. J. Yesudas	₹ 50,000/-
Best Female Playback Singer	Kaatru Veliyidai (For the song "Vaan Varuvaan")	Tamil	Shashaa Tirupati	₹ 50,000/-
Best Cinematography	Bhayanakam	Malayalam	Nikhil S Praveen	₹ 50,000/-
Best Screenplay • Screenplay Writer (Original)	Thondimuthalum Driksakshiyum	Malayalam	Sajeev Pazhoor	₹ 50,000/-
Best Screenplay • Screenplay Writer (Adapted)	Bhayanakam	Malayalam	Jayaraj	₹ 50,000/-
Best Screenplay • Dialogues	Hello Arsi	Odia	Sambit Mohanty	₹ 50,000/-
Best Audiography • Location Sound Recordist	Village Rockstars	Assamese	Mallika Das	₹ 50,000/-
Best Audiography • Sound designer	Walking with the Wind	Ladakhi	Sanal George	₹ 50,000/-
Best Audiography • Re-recordist of the Final Mixed Track	Walking with the Wind	Ladakhi	Justin Jose	₹ 50,000/-
Best Editing	Village Rockstars	Assamese	Rima Das	₹ 50,000/-
Best Production Design	Take Off	Malayalam	Santhosh Raman	₹ 50,000/-
Best Costume Design	Nagarkirtan	Bengali	Gobinda Mandal	₹ 50,000/-
Best Make-up Artist	Nagarkirtan	Bengali	Ram Rajjak	₹ 50,000/-
Best Music Direction • Songs	Kaatru Veliyidai	Tamil	A. R. Rahman	₹ 50,000/-
Best Music Direction • Background Score	Mom	Hindi	A. R. Rahman	₹ 50,000/-
Best Lyrics	March 22 (For the song "Mutthu Ratna")	Kannada	J. M. Prahlad	₹ 50,000/-
Best Special Effects	Baahubali 2: The Conclusion	Telugu	R. C. Kamal Kannan	₹ 50,000/-
Best Choreography	Toilet Ek Prem Katha (For the song "Gori Tu Latth Maar")	Hindi	Ganesh Acharya	₹ 50,000/-
Best Stunt Choreographer	Baahubali 2: The Conclusion	Telugu	King Solomon	₹ 50,000/-
Special Jury Award	Nagarkirtan	Bengali	Producer: Sani Ghose Ray; Director: Kaushik Ganguly	₹ 2,00,000/-
Special Mention	Newton	Hindi	Pankaj Tripathi (Actor)	Certificate only
Special Mention	Take Off	Malayalam	Parvathy (Actress)	Certificate only
Special Mention	Hello Arsi	Odia	Prakruti Mishra (Actress)	Certificate only
Special Mention	Mhorkya	Marathi	Yasharaj Karhade (Child artist)	Certificate only

=== Regional Awards ===
National Film Awards are also given to the best films in the regional languages of India. Awards for the regional languages are categorised as per their mention in the Eighth schedule of the Constitution of India. Awardees included producers and directors of the film. No films in languages other than those specified in the Schedule VIII of the Constitution were eligible.

Name of Award	Name of Film	Awardee(s)	Cash prize
Best Feature Film in Assamese	Ishu	Producer: Children's Film Society; Director: Utpal Borpujari	₹ 1,00,000/- each
Best Feature Film in Bengali	Mayurakshi	Producer: Firdausul Hasan, Prabal Halder; Director: Atanu Ghosh	₹ 1,00,000/- each
Best Feature Film in Gujarati	Dhh	Producer: Amruta Parande; Director: Manish Saini	₹ 1,00,000/- each
Best Feature Film in Hindi	Newton	Producer: Drishyam Films; Director: Amit V Masurkar	₹ 1,00,000/- each
Best Feature Film in Kannada	Hebbet Ramakka	Producer: S. A. Puttaraju; Director: N. R. Nanjunde Gowda	₹ 1,00,000/- each
Best Feature Film in Malayalam	Thondimuthalum Driksakshiyum	Producer: Urvasi Theatres; Director: Dileesh Pothan	₹ 1,00,000/- each
Best Feature Film in Marathi	Kachcha Limboo	Producer: Mandar Devasthali; Director: Prasad Oak	₹ 1,00,000/- each
Best Feature Film in Odia	Hello Arsi	Producer: Ajaya Routray; Director: Sambit Mohanty	₹ 1,00,000/- each
Best Feature Film in Tamil	To Let	Producer: Prema Chezhian; Director: Chezhiyan	₹ 1,00,000/- each
Best Feature Film in Telugu	The Ghazi Attack	Producer: Prasad V. Potluri; Director: Sankalp Reddy	₹ 1,00,000/- each

Best Feature Film in Each of the Language Other Than Those Specified in the Schedule VIII of the Constitution

Name of Award	Name of Film	Awardee(s)	Cash prize
Best Feature Film in Jasari	Sinjar	Producer: Shibu G. Suseelan; Director: Sandeep Pampally	₹ 1,00,000/- each
Best Feature Film in Ladakhi	Walking with the Wind	Producer: Mahesh Mohan; Director: Praveen Morchhale	₹ 1,00,000/- each
Best Feature Film in Tulu	Paddayi	Producer: Nithyananda Pai; Director: Abhaya Simha	₹ 1,00,000/- each

== Non-Feature Films ==
Short Films made in any Indian language and certified by the Central Board of Film Certification as a documentary/newsreel/fiction are eligible for non-feature film section.

=== Golden Lotus Award ===
Official Name: Swarna Kamal

All awardees were awarded with the 'Golden Lotus Award (Swarna Kamal)', a certificate and cash prize.

Name of Award	Name of Film	Language	Awardee(s)	Cash prize
Best Director in Non-Feature Film	Pavsacha Nibandh	Marathi	Nagraj Manjule	₹ 150,000/-

=== Silver Lotus Award ===
Official Name: Rajat Kamal

All awardees are awarded with the 'Silver Lotus Award (Rajat Kamal)' and cash prize.

Name of Award	Name of Film	Language	Awardee(s)	Cash prize
Best First Non-Feature Film	Water Baby	English Konkan	Producer: Varun Shah; Director: Pia Shah	₹ 75,000/- Each
Best Biographical Film / Best Historical Reconstruction / Compilation Film	Naachi se Baanchi	Hindi Mundari English	Producer: Films Division of India; Director: Biju Toppo	₹ 50,000/- Each (Cash Component to be shared)
Best Biographical Film / Best Historical Reconstruction / Compilation Film	Sword of Liberty	Malayalam	Producer: R. C. Suresh; Director: Shiny Jacob Benjamin	₹ 50,000/- Each (Cash Component to be shared)
Best Arts / Cultural Film	Girija	Hindi	Producer: Madhu Chandra, Sudha Datta; Director: Debapriya Adhikary, Samanwaya Sarkar	₹ 50,000/- Each
Best Environment Film including Best Agricultural Film	The Pangti Story	English Naga Lotha	Producer: Rajiv Mehrotra; Director: Sesino Yhoshü	₹ 50,000/- Each
Best Promotional Film	Poetry on Fabric: Chanderinama		Producer: Sanjay Gupta for Pro Art India; Director: Rajendra Janglay	₹ 50,000/- Each
Best Film on Social Issues	I am Bonnie	Bengali	Producer: Films Division of India; Director: Satarupa Santra	₹ 50,000/- Each (Cash Component to be shared)
Best Film on Social Issues	Veil Done	English	Producer: Juhi Bhatt; Director: Rajiv Mehrotra	₹ 50,000/- Each (Cash Component to be shared)
Best Educational / Motivational / Instructional Film	The Little Girl We Were and the Women We Are		Producer: Rahi Foundation; Director: Vaishali Sood	₹ 50,000/- Each
Best Anthropological/Ethnographic Film	Name, Place, Animal, Thing	Hindi	Producer and Director: Nithin R.	₹ 50,000/- Each (Cash Component to be shared)
Best Anthropological/Ethnographic Film	Slave Genesis	English	Producer and Director: Aneez K. Mappila	₹ 50,000/- Each (Cash Component to be shared)
Best Exploration / Adventure Film (including sports)	Ladakh Chale Rickshawala	Hindi	Producer: Films Division of India; Director: Indrani Chakrabarti	₹ 50,000/- Each
Best Investigative Film	1984, When the Sun Didn't Rise	Punjabi	Producer and Director: Teenaa Kaur Pasricha	₹ 50,000/- Each
Best Animation Film	Tokri – The Basket	Silent	Producer: Nilima Eriyat; Director: Suresh Eriyat; Animator: Studio Eeksaurus	₹ 50,000/- Each (Cash Component to be shared)
Best Animation Film	The Fish Curry	• Hindi • English	Producer: Munish Tewari; Director and Animator: Abhishek Verma	₹ 50,000/- Each (Cash Component to be shared)
Best Short Fiction Film	Mayat	Marathi	Producer and Director: Suyash Shinde	₹ 50,000/- Each
Best Film on Family Welfare	Happy Birthday	Marathi	Producer: FTII; Director: Medhpranav Babasaheb Powar	₹ 50,000/- Each
Best Cinematography	Eye Test	Malayalam	Cameraman: Appu Prabhakar	₹ 50,000/- Each (Cash Component to be shared)
Best Cinematography	Dawn		Cameraman: Arnold Fernandes	₹ 50,000/- Each (Cash Component to be shared)
Best Audiography	Pavsacha Nibandh	Marathi	Avinash Sonawane	₹ 50,000/-
Best Audiography • Location Sound Recordist	The Unreserved	Hindi	Samarth Mahajan	₹ 50,000/-
Best Editing	Mrityubhoj The Death Feast	Marathi	Sanjiv Monga and Tenzin Kunchok	₹ 50,000/- (Cash Component to be shared)
Best Music Direction	Shored of Liberty		Ramesh Narayanan	₹ 50,000/-
Best Narration / Voice Over	The Lion of Ladakh	English	Francois Castellino	₹ 50,000/-
Special Jury Award	A Very Old Man with Enormous Wings	English	Producer: Films Division of India; Director: Prateek Vats	₹ 50,000/- Each (Cash Component to be shared)
Special Jury Award	Monday	English	Producer: FTII; Director: Arun K	₹ 50,000/- Each (Cash Component to be shared)
Special Mention	Rebirth	English	Jayaraj (Director)	Certificate only
Special Mention	Cake Story	Hindi	Rukshana Tabassum (Director)	Certificate only
Special Mention	Afternoon	Marathi	Swapnil Vasant Kapure (Director)	Certificate only

== Best Writing on Cinema ==
The awards aim at encouraging study and appreciation of cinema as an art form and dissemination of information and critical appreciation of this art-form through publication of books, articles, reviews etc.

=== Golden Lotus Award ===
Official Name: Swarna Kamal

All awardees were awarded with the Golden Lotus Award (Swarna Kamal) accompanied with a cash prize.

Name of Award	Name of Book	Language	Awardee(s)	Cash prize
Best Book on Cinema	Matmagi Manipur: The first Manipuri Feature Film		Author: Bobby Wahengbam; Publisher: Angomningthou Preservation and Documentation	₹ 75,000/- Each
Best Film Critic	NA	English	Giridhar Jha	₹ 75,000/-
Special Mention (Film Critic)	NA	Hindi	Sunil Mishra	Certificate Only
