= Mallika Das =

Indian audiographer

- Born: Chhaygaon, Assam
- Occupation: Audiographer
- Known for: Village Rockstars
- Awards: National Film Award

Mallika Das is an Indian audiographer who works in Assamese cinema. She is known for her work in Village Rockstars that won many awards including four National Film Awards. The film was also selected as India's official entry to the 91st Academy Awards. Mallika was also awarded the Best Audiography award for Village Rockstar at the 65th National Film Awards.

== Early life ==
Mallika was born in Chaygaon, Assam, and is currently pursuing degree in Chaygaon. She is the eldest sister of Bhanita Das, an elementary school girl who lives with her widowed mother who does farming to make end meets.

== Village Rockstars ==
Village Rockstars was given an opportunity to help the film director Rima Das. She was awarded the National Film Award for Best Non-Feature Film Audiography and a prize of Rs 50,000.
