= Tora's Husband =

- Directed by: Rima Das
- Written by: Rima Das
- Produced by: Rima Das; Jaya Das
- Starring: Abhijit Das; Tarali Kalita Das; Bhuman Bhargav Das; Purbanchali Das
- Cinematography: Rima Das
- Edited by: Rima Das
- Music by: Sagar Desai
- Production company: Flying River Films
- Distributed by: Flying River Films
- Release date: 11 September 2022 (TIFF)
- Running time: 135 minutes
- Country: India
- Language: Assamese

Tora's Husband is a 2022 Indian Assamese language film written, shot, edited, produced and directed by Rima Das.

The film premiered at the 2022 Toronto International Film Festival in the prestigious Platform Prize section, followed by the Asian Premiere at Busan International Film Festival 2022 and the Indian Premiere at Kolkata International Film Festival 2022.

Rima Das dedicated this film to her father Bharat Chandra Das, who died during the COVID-19 pandemic.

== Plot summary ==
The drama shows a family man's life unravelling in the face of the COVID-19 pandemic.

== Cast ==
- Abhijit Das as Jaan
- Tarali Kalita Das as Tora
- Bhuman Bhargav Das as Bhargav
- Purbanchali Das as Manu
- Nilima Das
- Simanta Malakar
- Mallika Das

== Production ==
The film was shot in Das' home town of Chaygaon in Assam. Rima Das said of the film:

The story of my protagonist reflects my personal journey living and working amidst the pandemic. In the midst of loss, lockdowns and life, we shot the film over two years. Shooting this film was more challenging than shooting my previous films because the pandemic restricts you in many ways. There was this constant feeling of fear and restlessness, which my characters also depict."

== Critical reception ==
The first Indian film to compete in the Platform section, and Rima Das' third film in a row to premiere at Toronto International Film Festival.

Ravi Srinivasan, the Festival Programmer at 2022 Toronto International Film Festival described the film as:

"...a perceptive drama that captures how tensions can erode lives and relationships during difficult times when everyone is struggling to survive. With careful attention paid to the unique pressure faced by small-business owners, Das’ purview extends beyond the middle class, capturing the crisis with impressive scope and documentary-like attentiveness, pointing to the societal fragilities that preceded — and will follow — the effects of the pandemic itself. With remarkable authenticity, Das illuminates both the dignity and vulnerability of ordinary people in one of the defining films of our historical moment."

The film has been receiving accolades for its realistic take of life during the pandemic at its Asian Premiere at Busan International Film Festival 2022 and the Indian Premiere at Kolkata International Film Festival 2022 and other festivals where the film has been showcased.

== Official selection at festivals ==
- Toronto International Film Festival (Platform Section)
- Busan International Film Festival 2022
- World Film Festival of Bangkok 2022
- Hainan Island International Film Festival 2022
- Kolkata International Film Festival 2022
