= Kim Jiseok Award =

Section of Busan International Film Festival

- Awarded for: Two best films in the competition category for the Asian directors who have directed more than three feature films
- Country: South Korea
- Presented by: Busan International Film Festival
- First award: 2017
- Final award: 2024
- Winner(s): Village Rockstars 2 by Rima Das, India; Yen and Ai-Lee by Tom Lin Shu-yu, Taiwan
- Website: biff.kr

The Kim Jiseok Award (Korean: 김지석 상) is an annual film award, presented by the Busan International Film Festival, to films in the competition category for the Korean and Asian directors who have directed more than three feature films. The award is named after the late Kim Jiseok, the festival's co-founder, deputy director, and head programmer, who died in May 2017. During the same year, the award was first created.

Each year, two films are selected and awarded a cash prize of US$10,000 each. Since its inception until 2021, the winners are selected from the festival's A Window on Asian Cinema section. In 2022, the festival launched the award's own competition section.

The award was discontinued from 2025 and the New Currents and Kim Jiseok categories were merged into new updated competitive section.

== Films ==
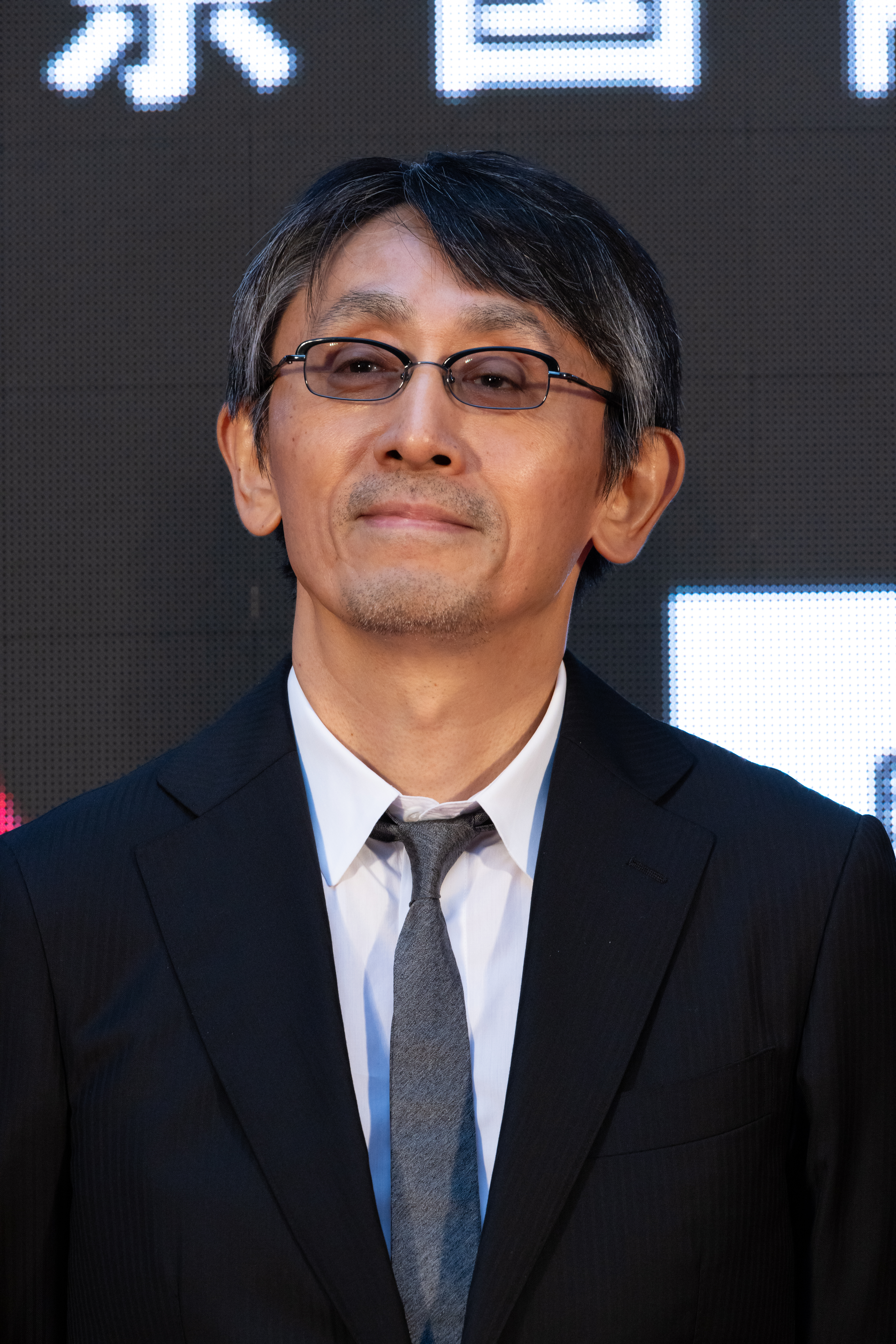
Yoshida Daihachi, 2017 award winner

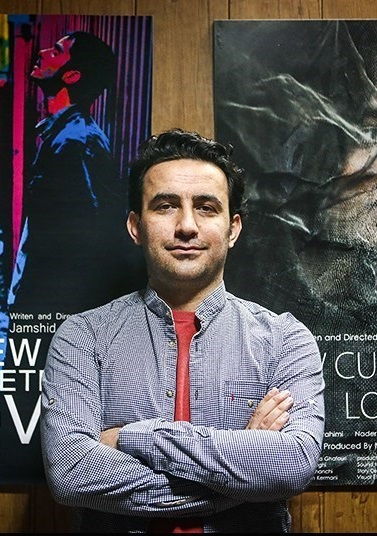
Jamshid Mahmoudi, 2018 award winner

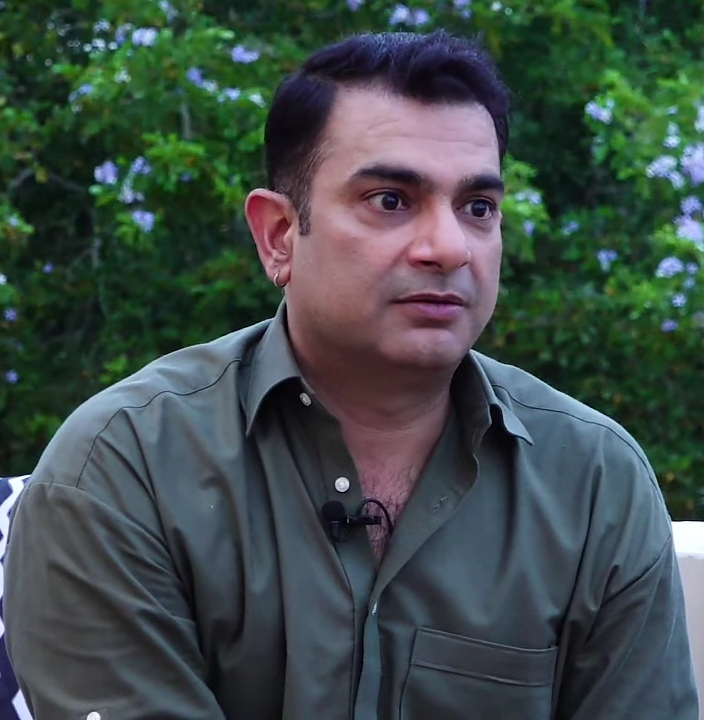
Sarmad Khoosat, 2019 award winner

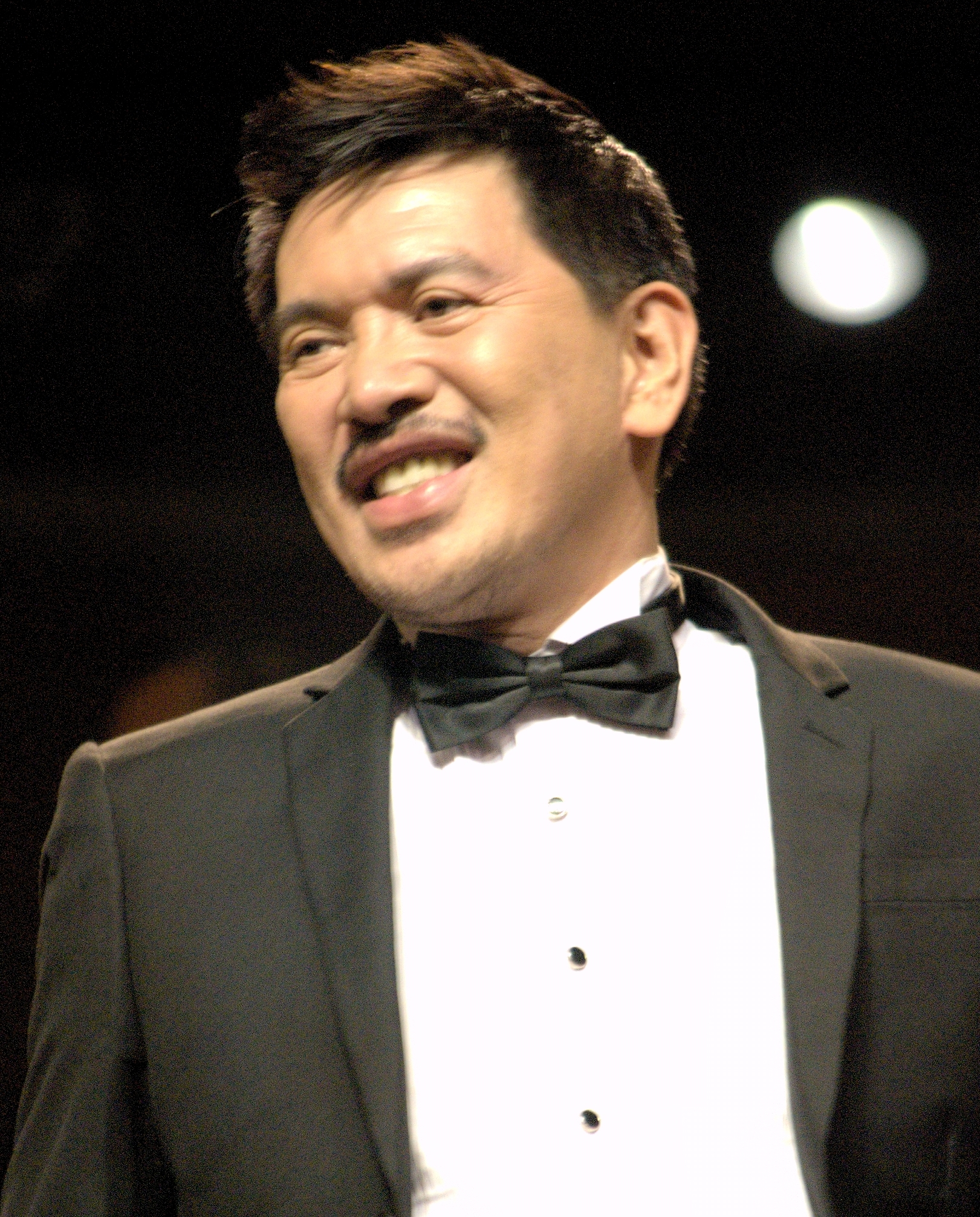
Brillante Mendoza, 2021 award winner

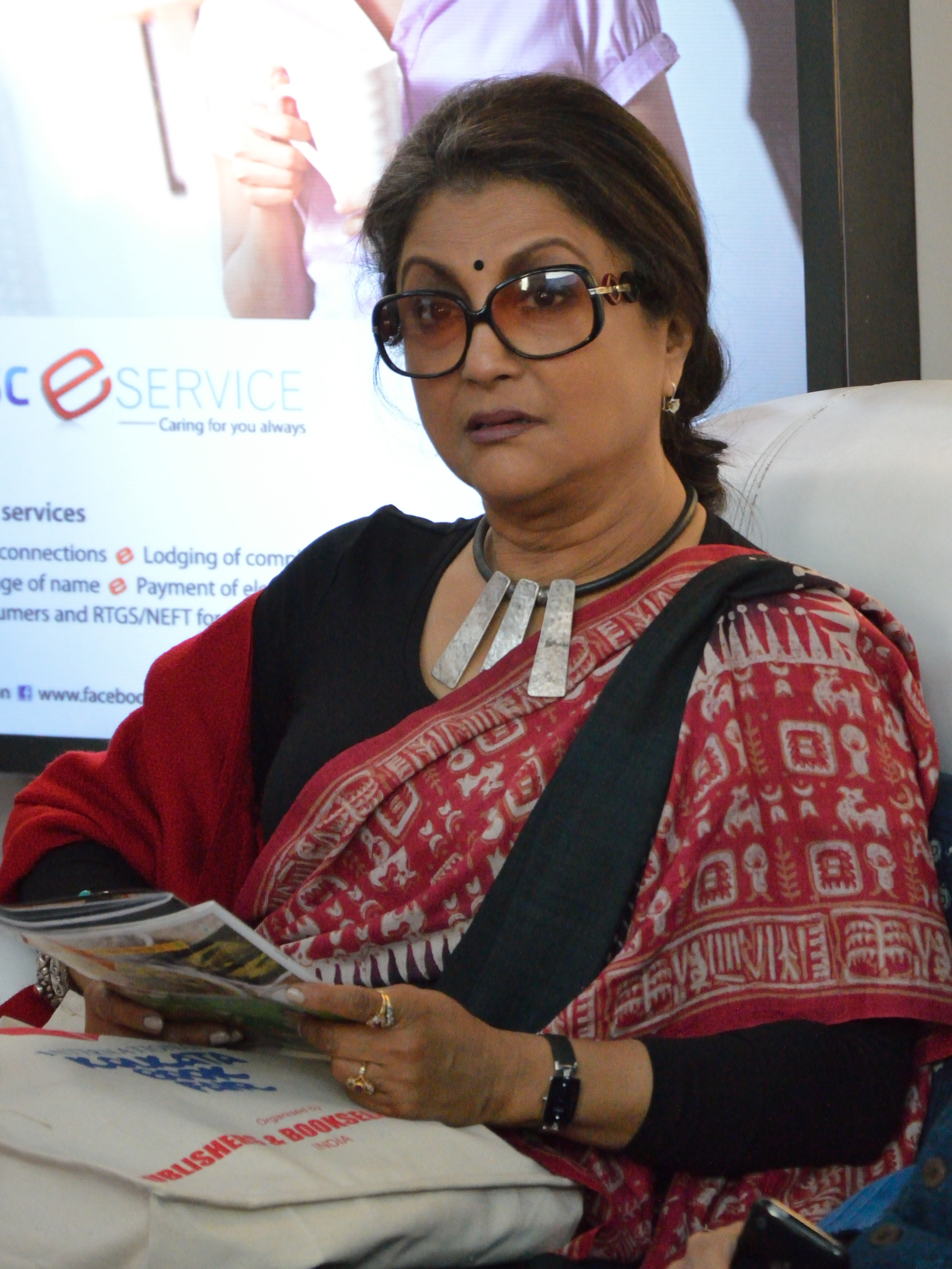
Aparna Sen, 2021 award winner

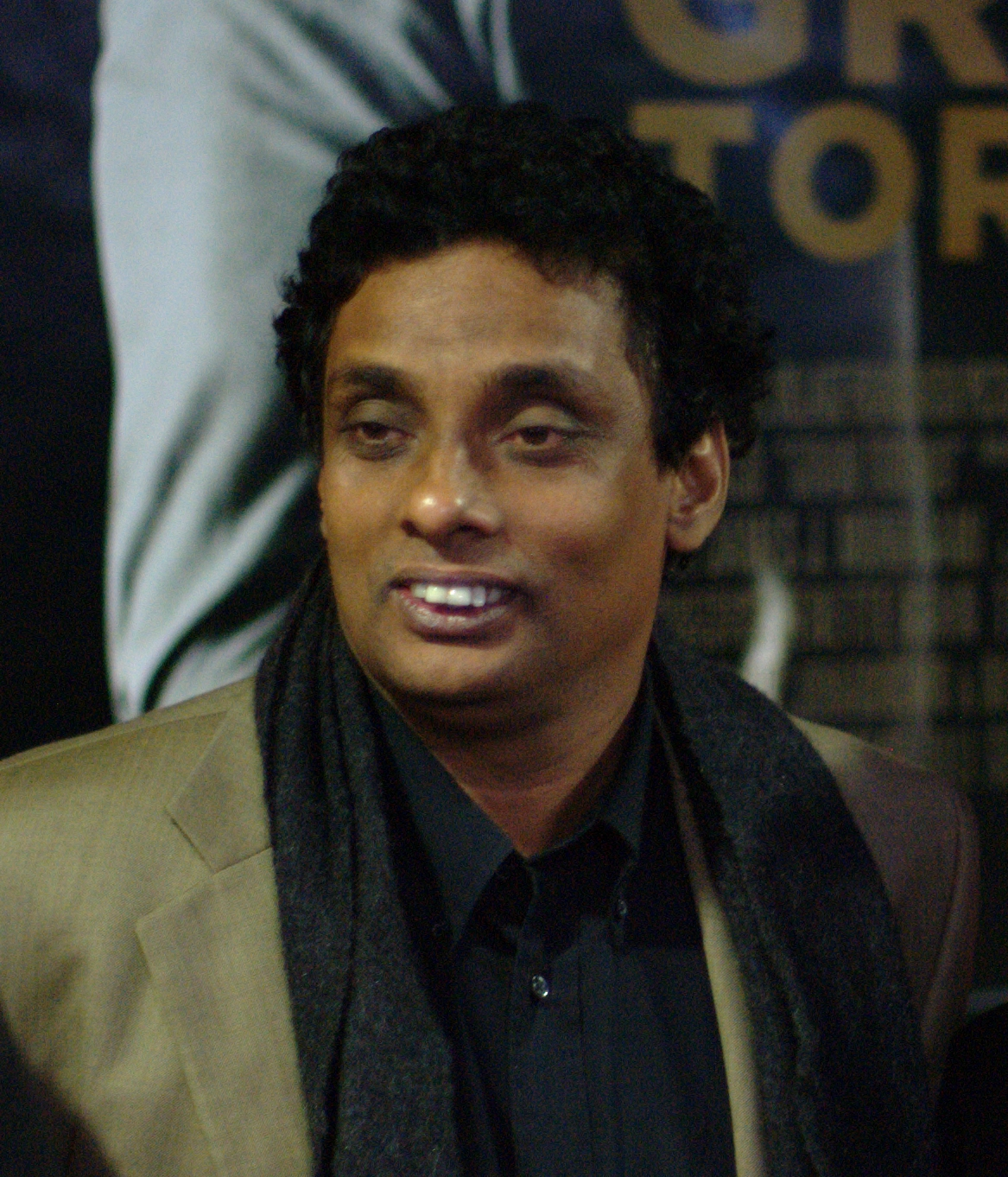
Prasanna Vithanage, 2023 award winner

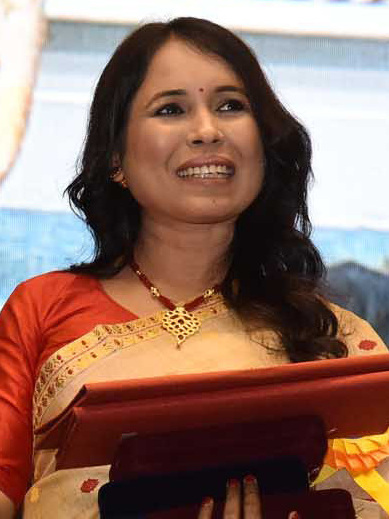
Rima Das, 2024 award winner

Year	Jury	Film	Director	Ref.
2017	Tony Rayns; Darcy Paquet; Garin Nugroho	Malila: The Farewell Flower	Anucha Boonyawatana	
2017	Tony Rayns; Darcy Paquet; Garin Nugroho	The Scythian Lamb	Daihachi Yoshida	
2017	Tony Rayns; Darcy Paquet; Garin Nugroho	Ash	Li Xiaofeng	
2017	Tony Rayns; Darcy Paquet; Garin Nugroho	The Bold, the Corrupt, and the Beautiful	Yang Ya-che	
2017	Tony Rayns; Darcy Paquet; Garin Nugroho	The Carousel Never Stops Turning	Ismail Basbeth	
2017	Tony Rayns; Darcy Paquet; Garin Nugroho	Goodbye Kathmandu	Nabin Subba	
2017	Tony Rayns; Darcy Paquet; Garin Nugroho	In the Shadows	Dipesh Jain	
2017	Tony Rayns; Darcy Paquet; Garin Nugroho	Silent Mist	Zhang Miaoyan	
2017	Tony Rayns; Darcy Paquet; Garin Nugroho	Smaller and Smaller Circles	Raya Martin	
2017	Tony Rayns; Darcy Paquet; Garin Nugroho	Wilderness	Kishi Yoshiyuki	
2018	Justin Chang; Hayashi Kanako; Eric Khoo	Rona, Azim's Mother	Jamshid Mahmoudi	
2018	Justin Chang; Hayashi Kanako; Eric Khoo	The Rib	Zhang Wei	
2018	Justin Chang; Hayashi Kanako; Eric Khoo	27 Steps of May	Ravi Bharwani	
2018	Justin Chang; Hayashi Kanako; Eric Khoo	Asandhimitta	Asoka Handagama	
2018	Justin Chang; Hayashi Kanako; Eric Khoo	Bhonsle	Devashish Makhija	
2018	Justin Chang; Hayashi Kanako; Eric Khoo	Dare to Stop Us	Kazuya Shiraishi	
2018	Justin Chang; Hayashi Kanako; Eric Khoo	Demons	Daniel Hui	
2018	Justin Chang; Hayashi Kanako; Eric Khoo	The Secret of a Leader	Farkhat Sharipov	
2018	Justin Chang; Hayashi Kanako; Eric Khoo	Widow of Silence	Praveen Morchhale	
2019	Mohsen Makhmalbaf; Huh Moonyung; Tan Chui Mui	Circus of Life	Sarmad Khoosat	
2019	Mohsen Makhmalbaf; Huh Moonyung; Tan Chui Mui	Iewduh	Pradip Kurbah	
2019	Mohsen Makhmalbaf; Huh Moonyung; Tan Chui Mui	Bitter Chestnut	Gurvinder Singh	
2019	Mohsen Makhmalbaf; Huh Moonyung; Tan Chui Mui	Cinema Donkey	Shahed Ahmadlou	
2019	Mohsen Makhmalbaf; Huh Moonyung; Tan Chui Mui	It Stopped Raining	Nakagawa Ryutaro	
2019	Mohsen Makhmalbaf; Huh Moonyung; Tan Chui Mui	The Promised Land	Takahisa Zeze	
2019	Mohsen Makhmalbaf; Huh Moonyung; Tan Chui Mui	Suk Suk	Ray Yeung	
2019	Mohsen Makhmalbaf; Huh Moonyung; Tan Chui Mui	Where We Belong	Kongdej Jaturanrasamee	
2020	Zhao Tao; Jung Sung-il; Mouly Surya	Drowning in Holy Water	Navid Mahmoudi	
2020	Zhao Tao; Jung Sung-il; Mouly Surya	The Slaughterhouse	Abbas Amini	
2020	Zhao Tao; Jung Sung-il; Mouly Surya	Kayattam	Sanal Kumar Sasidharan	
2021	Reza Mirkarimi; Gulnara Abikeyeva; Kim Haery	Gensan Punch	Brillante Mendoza	
2021	Reza Mirkarimi; Gulnara Abikeyeva; Kim Haery	The Rapist	Aparna Sen	
2021	Reza Mirkarimi; Gulnara Abikeyeva; Kim Haery	24	Royston Tan	
2021	Reza Mirkarimi; Gulnara Abikeyeva; Kim Haery	The Bargain	Wang Qi	
2021	Reza Mirkarimi; Gulnara Abikeyeva; Kim Haery	No Land's Man	Mostofa Sarwar Farooki	
2021	Reza Mirkarimi; Gulnara Abikeyeva; Kim Haery	Riverside Mukolitta	Naoko Ogigami	
2021	Reza Mirkarimi; Gulnara Abikeyeva; Kim Haery	Sughra's Sons	Ilgar Najaf	
2022	Jean-Michel Frodon; Naoko Ogigami; Kim Hee-jung	Alteration	Yalkin Tuychiev	
2022	Jean-Michel Frodon; Naoko Ogigami; Kim Hee-jung	Scent of Wind	Hadi Mohaghegh	
2022	Jean-Michel Frodon; Naoko Ogigami; Kim Hee-jung	December	Anshul Chauhan	
2022	Jean-Michel Frodon; Naoko Ogigami; Kim Hee-jung	Life & Life	Ali Ghavitan	
2022	Jean-Michel Frodon; Naoko Ogigami; Kim Hee-jung	Seventeeners	Prithvi Konanur	
2022	Jean-Michel Frodon; Naoko Ogigami; Kim Hee-jung	Six Characters	M.L. Pundhevanop Dhewakul	
2022	Jean-Michel Frodon; Naoko Ogigami; Kim Hee-jung	Storyteller	Anant Mahadevan	
2022	Jean-Michel Frodon; Naoko Ogigami; Kim Hee-jung	A Wing and a Prayer	Lee Kwang-kuk	
2023	Martin Thérouanne; Miwa Nishikawa; Lee Kwang-kuk	Bride Abduction	Mirlan Abdikhalikov	
2023	Martin Thérouanne; Miwa Nishikawa; Lee Kwang-kuk	Paradise	Prasanna Vithanage	
2023	Martin Thérouanne; Miwa Nishikawa; Lee Kwang-kuk	24 Hours with Gaspar	Yosep Anggi Noen	
2023	Martin Thérouanne; Miwa Nishikawa; Lee Kwang-kuk	At the End of the Film	Ahn Seon-kyung	
2023	Martin Thérouanne; Miwa Nishikawa; Lee Kwang-kuk	Blesser	Lee Sang-cheol	
2023	Martin Thérouanne; Miwa Nishikawa; Lee Kwang-kuk	Doi Boy	Nontawat Numbenchapol	
2023	Martin Thérouanne; Miwa Nishikawa; Lee Kwang-kuk	Ichiko	Akihiro Toda	
2023	Martin Thérouanne; Miwa Nishikawa; Lee Kwang-kuk	The Moon	Yuya Ishii	
2023	Martin Thérouanne; Miwa Nishikawa; Lee Kwang-kuk	Moro	Brillante Mendoza	
2023	Martin Thérouanne; Miwa Nishikawa; Lee Kwang-kuk	Something Like an Autobiography	Mostofa Sarwar Farooki	
2024	Christian Jeune; Prasanna Vithanage; Shin Su-won	Village Rockstars 2	Rima Das	
2024	Christian Jeune; Prasanna Vithanage; Shin Su-won	Yen and Ai-Lee	Tom Lin Shu-yu	
2024	Christian Jeune; Prasanna Vithanage; Shin Su-won	Aimitagai	Kusano Shogo	
2024	Christian Jeune; Prasanna Vithanage; Shin Su-won	Deal at the Border	Dastan Zhapar Ryskeldi	
2024	Christian Jeune; Prasanna Vithanage; Shin Su-won	I Am Love	Baek Sung-bin	
2024	Christian Jeune; Prasanna Vithanage; Shin Su-won	Motherland	Brillante Mendoza	
2024	Christian Jeune; Prasanna Vithanage; Shin Su-won	So It Goes	Lee Ha-ram	
2024	Christian Jeune; Prasanna Vithanage; Shin Su-won	Travelling Alone	Ishibashi Yuho	
