= Village Rockstars 2 =

2024 film by Rima Das

- Official poster
- Directed by: Rima Das
- Written by: Rima Das
- Produced by: Rima Das; Fran Borgia
- Starring: Bhanita Das; Manabendra Das; Boloram Das
- Cinematography: Rima Das
- Edited by: Rima Das
- Music by: Pallab Talukdar
- Production companies: Flying River Films; Akanga Film Asia
- Distributed by: Flying River Films
- Release date: 4 October 2024 (BIFF)
- Running time: 108 minutes
- Countries: India; Singapore
- Language: Assamese

Village Rockstars 2 is a 2024 Indian-Singapore Assamese language coming-of-age drama film written, edited, produced and directed by Rima Das. Sequel to Village Rockstars (2017), revisits the life of Dhunu, seven years after the events of the last film.

The film premiered at the 29th Busan International Film Festival on 4 October 2024 competing in the Kim Jiseok section, where it won Kim Jiseok Award.

== Synopsis ==
Dhunu, now in her late teens, still climbs trees, swims, and most importantly, dreams of continuing her childhood life as a guitarist in her rock band. However, life does not unfold as Dhunu wishes. As she faces the bitter and sour moments of life, she stands on the threshold of leaving her once-happy childhood behind.

== Cast ==
- Bhanita Das as Dhunu
- Basanti Das as Maa
- Manabendra Das as Manab, Dhunu's elder brother
- Boloram Das as Bolo
- Bhaskar Das as Bhaskar
- Junumoni Boro as Junu
- Bishnu Kalita as Bishnu

== Release ==
Village Rockstars 2 had its world premiere at 29th Busan International Film Festival on 4 October 2024. It was also selected for the MAMI Mumbai Film Festival 2024, where it competed in the South Asia Competition section.

It was selected at the 2nd Eikhoigi Imphal International Film Festival 2025 under the International Competition: Fiction section and was screened on 8 February 2025.

The film was selected in the Generation 14plus section of the 75th Berlin International Film Festival, where it had its European premiere on 16 February 2025. It was also selected at the 8th Malaysia International Film Festival in Lenses of India Women Filmmakers section and screened on 24 July 2025.

The film is scheduled to release in six Indian cities on 25 September 2026.

== Reception ==
Nikki Baughan reviewing the film for ScreenDaily praised Bhanita Das for giving "a low-key, naturalistic performance conveying Dhunu’s deep connection to this land and her family". Baughan felt that the Rima Das has given "subtle approach" to the film which "extends to every element of Village Rockstars 2, giving it the feeling of a documentary." Baughan opined that "Rima Das has used the narrative as a way of amplifying the struggles of the people of Assam, which is bearing the effects of climate change and cut-throat battle for land and resources."

Kalpajyoti Bhuyan in his review for High on Films sums up how the "Heart of Nature and Weight of Life" finds focus in Village Rockstars 2. He also adds that the film sends out a strong ecological message as it blends "art and activism". "Filmmaker Rima Das has also previously criticized the Assam government’s decision to fell thousands of trees along NH 17 for the construction of four lanes. It’s only fitting that her voice of protest comes out in her film as well", he added.

== Accolades ==
The film competed for Kim Jiseok award at Busan International Film Festival, which is given to 2 films from the selected 10 films in the competition category for the Asian directors who have directed more than 3 feature films, and present their new film for premiere in the festival.

Award	Date of ceremony	Category	Recipient(s)	Result	Ref.
Busan International Film Festival	11 October 2024	Kim Jiseok Award	Rima Das	Won	
MAMI Mumbai Film Festival	24 October 2024	South Asia Competition	Rima Das	Nominated	
Berlin International Film Festival	23 February 2025	Grand Prize for Best Film	Rima Das	Nominated	
Toulouse Indian Film Festival	27 April 2025	Jury Prize (ex aequo)	Rima Das	Won	
Asia Pacific Screen Awards	27 November 2025	Best Youth Film	Village Rockstars 2	Nominated	
