= Teenaa Kaur Pasricha =

Indian documentary filmmaker

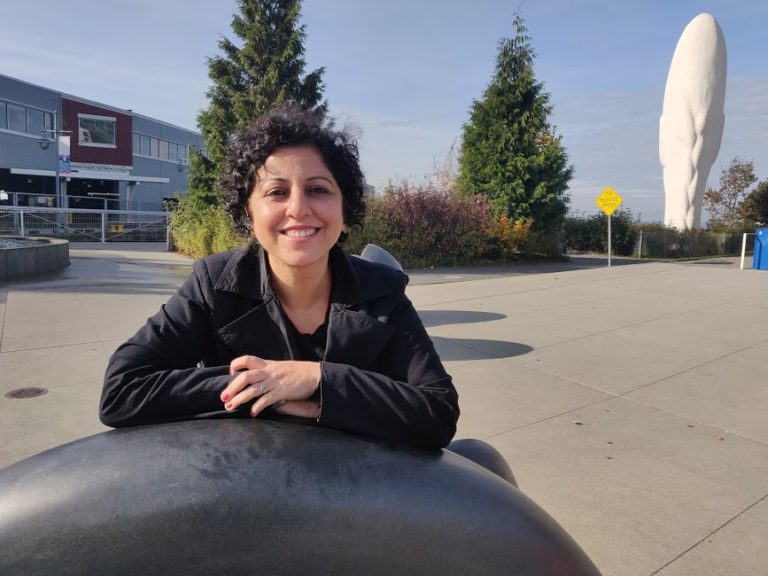
- Born: India
- Occupations: Filmmaker; writer
- Years active: 2003–present

Teenaa Kaur Pasricha is an Indian filmmaker, screenwriter, TEDx Speaker whose work focuses on climate change, the environment and social justice. She is the founder of the production company Green Earth Pictures that is involved in making documentary and fiction films.

Pasricha’s documentary 1984, When the Sun Didn't Rise examines the experiences of women and children who survived the 1984 anti-Sikh violence. The film received the National Film Award for Best Investigative Film, presented by the President of India. Her more recent film, What If I Tell You, is a personal documentary film about identity, stigma and partnership after breast cancer. In Symphony with Earth is about the communities living in tune with Environment. has been broadcast on National Geographic and Fox History.

Her project is selected under Climate scriptwriting lab by Netflix and Pluc.TV.

== Career ==
Pasricha is selected for SACCF India Coproduction lab at Toronto International Film Festival. She has also been selected for ProducerLAND's NFDC Producer’s lab 2025. She has received the U.S. Department of State’s International Visitor Leadership Program (IVLP) fellowship on Films for Social Change, the Time Warner Foundation Screenwriting Fellowship at the Asia Society in New York, the Bitchitra Fellowship, and an IAWRT film fellowship.

Her films The Deer, the Tree and Me and The Woods Are Calling on environment and wildlife conservation have done rounds of film festivals and broadcast on National TV. Her work has screened at the Busan International Film Festival, International Documentary and Short Film Festival of Kerala (IDSFFK), Mumbai International Film Festival (MIFF), DC Asian Pacific American Film Festival, Film Bazaar, DOK Leipzig, and DocEdge Kolkata.

== Filmography ==
- What If I Tell You (2026)
- When the Earth Sang a song (Kahani Aayee Hai) (2022)
- 1984, When The Sun Didn't Rise (2018)
- The Woods are Calling (2017)
- The deer, tree and me (2015)
- In Symphony with Earth (2012)
- Hola! The Mighty Colors (2011)

== Awards and nominations ==
- 2018 - Won for the Best Investigative Film at the 65th National Film Awards for 1984, When the Sun Didn't Rise
- 2018 - Nominated for the National Competition at the Mumbai International Film Festival for 1984, When the Sun Didn't Rise
- 2016 - Nominated for the Best Documentary at the Mumbai International Film Festival for The deer, tree and me
