= Village Rockstars =

- Official poster
- Directed by: Rima Das
- Written by: Rima Das
- Produced by: Rima Das; Jaya Das
- Starring: Bhanita Das; Manabendra Das
- Cinematography: Rima Das
- Edited by: Rima Das
- Distributed by: Flying River Films
- Release dates: 9 September 2017 (TIFF); 28 September 2018
- Running time: 87 minutes
- Country: India
- Language: Assamese

Village Rockstars is a 2017 Indian Assamese language coming-of-age drama film written, edited, co-produced and directed by Rima Das, who is a self-taught filmmaker. The story follows a 10-year-old girl who befriends a group of boys and dreams of becoming a rock star.

The film premiered at the 2017 Toronto International Film Festival (TIFF). More significantly, it received the Best Feature Film ‘Swarna Kamal’ award at the 65th National Film Awards, which were declared in New Delhi on 13 April 2018. Village Rockstars also won awards in three other categories: Best Child Artist, Best Location Sound Recordist and Best Editing. It was selected as India's official entry to the 91st Academy Awards, in the category for Academy Award for Best International Feature Film, but it was not nominated for top nine films from a total of 87.

== Plot summary ==
Dhunu is the protagonist amidst a group of real village rock stars. Growing up in hardship, she cherished aspiration of having her own rock band. Her life although engulfed by hostile natural calamities does not bar her from dreaming of owning a real guitar.

Ten-year-old Dhunu (Bhanita Das) lives in Kalardiya village near Chaygaon in Assam, India with her widowed mother (Basanti Das) and elder brother Manabendra (Manabendra Das). While helping her mother sell snacks at a local event, she becomes mesmerized by a band that performs there. The part that is so delightfully hokey: the boys belt out their hits with musical instruments made of styrofoam. She proceeds to copy them, carving a guitar.

Impressionable and tenacious at the same time, Dhunu reads a comic book and decides she wants to form a band playing real instruments. Rupee by rupee, she begins to save for the guitar. She reads an article in a scrap newspaper and decides that positive thinking can make the possession of the guitar materialize. But as floods destroy the family's crops, Dhunu must choose her priorities.

== Cast ==
- Bhanita Das as Dhunu
- Basanti Das as Dhunu's mother
- Manabendra Das as Dhunu's elder brother
- Boloram Das
- Rinku Dast
- Bishnu Kalita

== Production ==
The film was entirely shot in Das's home village of Kalardiya in Lower Assam, where her family played much of the cast, including her cousin Bhanita Das as the lead role of Dhunu. The film took nearly four years to make. The initial idea for the film was inspired by an event during the post-production of Rima Das's first film, Antardrishti (Man with the Binoculars), when she came across a group of village children playing imaginary instruments to a song on the radio. Rima Das served as the director, producer, writer, editor and cinematographer for Village Rockstars (with assistance from her cousin, Mallika Das), making the film using a Canon 5D camera and one lens. She bought this camera by selling gold jewelry and raising a loan. Speaking on the no-budget nature of the production of the film, Rima Das said, "I shot this film without any crew and cast of the film wasn't trained in acting, so the process to make this film was hard and challenging, but I think it is possible if you have belief in yourself."

== Critical reception ==
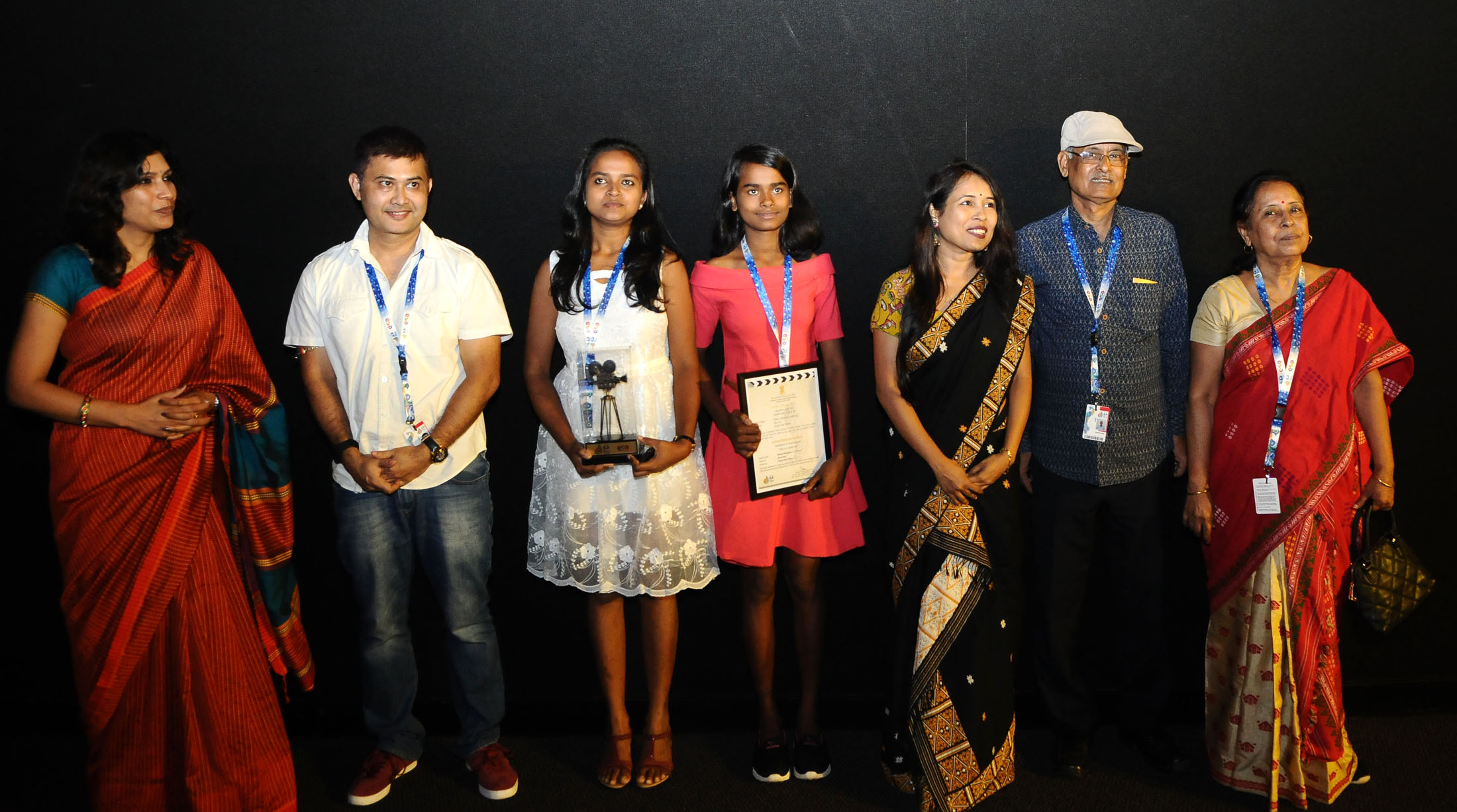
Director Rima Das (third from right) with cast and crew of the film at 48th International Film Festival of India, in Panaji, Goa on 21 November 2017

Village Rockstars won the Film Critics Circle of India Award for the Best Indian Film of 2017. Jury member Dalton L declared it "a milestone film of sorts", adding, "Village Rockstars epitomises the trials and tribulations, and heralds the coming of age, of a filmmaker, of her protagonist, and of the indie film movement in India". Jury member Priyanka Dasgupta said, "Rima Das’ film is a lyrical montage of life and times in contemporary rural India. It subtly draws attention to complex gender issues – sometimes even subverting the conventional gender norms – without ever getting preachy. Bhanita Das – the pint-sized fiery ball of lovable energy – is endearingly natural. But just when one fears that the film might become schmaltzy, the film-maker takes control. The lens speaks volumes, sometimes conveying more than the dialogues. Such a work by a first-time director holds a lot of promise for Indian cinema". Jury member Premchand called it "a women’s journey into the heart of the matter." Saibal Chatterjee, a founder member of the Society, gave the film a five-star rating, and says in his review, "A masterwork is usually the result of strict adherence to artistic and functional rules. Village Rockstars respects none: it dons a raw, innocent cloak and exudes a degree of purity that deliberate craft can never bestow on a film... The film stands for something that is always under threat: the courage to ignore the reality that life is exceedingly difficult for cinema that is made on the margins of a giant production machinery and recognize that there always are ways out for those who revel in battling the odds, no matter how daunting, and overcoming them."

Maggie Lee says in her review for Variety, "By focusing on tween characters, the picture evokes that freewheeling stage when gender roles are still blurry in the friendships between boys and girls. Then as suddenly as a monsoon, Dhunu’s first period arrives. The rituals held to initiate her into womanhood — making her wear a sari, segregating her from the boys — are seen as attempts to enforce her otherness." Deborah Young in The Hollywood Reporter says, "Village Rockstars’ storytelling is so offhand it borders on documentary. The action follows natural rhythms, the seasons, biology." Hannah Lynn of Pittsburgh City Paper compared the film to The Florida Project in that it is "aimless without being pointless" while Barry Hertz of The Globe and Mail called it "confident and sincere", giving it 3.5 out of 4 stars. Radheyan Simonpillai of NOW gave the film 4 stars and lamented the fact that the film wasn't nominated at the academy awards, writing that he'd take the "stunning, poetic film [...] over Roma (or Cold War, or Capernaum or Never Look Away) any day."

On review aggregator Rotten Tomatoes, the film holds an approval rating of 95% based on 19 reviews, with an average rating of 8.2/10.

== Home media ==
The film was also released to Netflix on 20 January 2020.

== Awards ==
Award	Date of ceremony (Note: Each date is linked to the article about the awards held that year, wherever possible.)	Category	Recipients	Result	Ref.
National Film Awards	April 13, 2018	Best Feature Film	Rima Das	Won	
National Film Awards	April 13, 2018	Best Child Artist	Bhanita Das	Won	
National Film Awards	April 13, 2018	Best Location Sound Recordist	Mallika Das	Won	
National Film Awards	April 13, 2018	Best Editing	Rima Das	Won	
Jio MAMI Film Festival 2017	October 18, 2018	Golden Gateway award for best film in India Gold category	Village Rockstars	Won	
Jio MAMI Film Festival 2017	October 18, 2018	Oxfam Best Film for Gender Equality award	Village Rockstars	Won	
Jio MAMI Film Festival 2017	October 18, 2018	Young Critics Choice award	Village Rockstars	Won	
Cork Film Festival	November 11, 2017	Gradam Spiorad Na Féile / Spirit of the Festival Award	Village Rockstars	Won	
Cairo International Film Festival	November 21, 2017	Best Artistic Contribution from the International Critic's Week competition	Village Rockstars	Won	
Olympia International Film Festival for Children & Young people	26 November 2017	Best Actress	Bhanita Das	Won	
Olympia International Film Festival for Children & Young people	26 November 2017	Best Director	Rima Das	Won	
Olympia International Film Festival for Children & Young people	26 November 2017	Special Jury prize	Village Rockstars	Won	
Smile International Film Festival for Children & Youth	17 December 2017	Best Children's Film	Village Rockstars	Won	
Smile International Film Festival for Children & Youth	17 December 2017	Best Actor	Bhanita Das	Won	
Cine Junior Film Festival, France 2018	1 January 2018	Grand Prix (Best Film)	Village Rockstars	Won	
Muestra de Cine Lanzarote 2017, Spain	18 May 2017	Best Young Film	Village Rockstars	Won	
Indian Film Festival of Los Angeles	15 April 2018	Grand Jury Prize for Best Feature	Village Rockstars	Won	
Buenos Aires Festival Internacional de Cine Independiente, Argentina 2018	22 April 2018	SIGNIS Prize	Village Rockstars	Won	
Prag Cine Awards 2018	27 May 2018	Best Film	Village Rockstars	Won	
Prag Cine Awards 2018	27 May 2018	Best Actor (Female)	Bhanita Das	Won	
Prag Cine Awards 2018	27 May 2018	Best Editing	Rima Das	Won	
Prag Cine Awards 2018	27 May 2018	Best Sound Designer	Amrit Pritam	Won	
Prag Cine Awards 2018	27 May 2018	Jury's Special Mention	Basanti Das	Won	
7th Assam state Film Award and Festival	29 July 2018	Kamal Narayan Choudhry Award for Best Director	Rima Das	Won	
7th Assam state Film Award and Festival	29 July 2018	Best Sound Design	Amrit Pritam	Won	
7th Assam state Film Award and Festival	29 July 2018	Best Debut Actress	Bhanita Das	Won	
7th Assam state Film Award and Festival	29 July 2018	Nalin Dowerah Award for Best Cinematography	Rima Das	Won	
3rd BRICS film festival	27 July 2018	Best Actress	Bhanita Das	Won	
3rd BRICS film festival	27 July 2018	Special Jury Award	Village Rockstars	Won	

== Official selection at festivals ==
- Toronto International Film Festival (Discovery Section) 2017
- San Sebastián International Film Festival (New Directors Competition) 2017
- Guwahati International Film Festival
- Dharamshala International Film Festival (closing film)
- Cannes Film Festival 2017
- Kerala International Film Festival (International Competition) 2017
- SIFFCY 2017 (Opening film)
- Tallinn Black Nights 2017
- HKIFF, Hong Kong International Film Festival 2018
- International Film Festival of India, Goa 2017
- Glasgow Film Festival, UK 2018 (UK premiere)
- Cairo International Film Festival 2017, Egypt
- MAMI Mumbai Film Festival 2017, India
- Medellín International Film Festival 2017, Colombia
- International Children's Film Festival India 2017, India (Competition Section)
- Leiden International Film Festival, Netherlands 2017
- Cork Film Festival 2017, Ireland
- Olympia International Film Festival 2017, Greece (Competition Section)
- Cine Junior Film Festival, France, 2018 (French premiere)
- Les Toiles Filantes, France, 2018
- Cairo International Women's Film Festival, Egypt, 2018
- Aga Khan Museum, Canada, 2018
- Reel 2 Real International Film Festival for Youth, Canada, 2018
- Tromso International Film Festival, Norway, 2018 (Norwegian premiere)
- Göteborg International Film Festival, Sweden, 2018 (Swedish Premiere)
- MOOOV Film Festival, Belgium, 2018 (Belgium premiere)
- Muestra de Cine de Lanzarote, Spain, 2017
- Jogjakarta Film Festival, Indonesia 2017 (South East Asian Premiere)
- Bangalore Film Festival, India
- Chennai International Film Festival, India
- Singapore South Asian International Film Festival 2018

== Sequel ==
A sequel to the film titled as Village Rockstars 2 will premiere at the 29th Busan International Film Festival to be held from 2 to 11 October 2024. It will also compete for Kim Jiseok Award along with seven other films. In a statement Rima Das said, "The sequel stands on its own, delving into Dhunu's relationship with her mother, mother nature, and music. I dedicate this film to all the young people with talent and dreams but limited resources to achieve them." She further added, "I am hopeful that just as audiences embraced Village Rockstars, they will embrace this film as well."

== See also ==
- List of submissions to the 91st Academy Awards for Best Foreign Language Film
- List of Indian submissions for the Academy Award for Best Foreign Language Film
