= Spirit World (film) =

2024 French-Japanese fantasy film

- Promotional poster
- French: Yūrei
- Directed by: Eric Khoo
- Screenplay by: Edward Khoo
- Produced by: Shin Yamaguchi; Mathilde Incerti; Fong Cheng Tan; Yutaka Tachibana
- Starring: Catherine Deneuve; Masaaki Sakai; Yutaka Takenouchi; Jun Fubuki
- Cinematography: Adrian Tan
- Edited by: Chong Wu Koh; Matthieu Laclau
- Music by: Jeanne Cherhal
- Production companies: M.I. Movies; Knockonwood; Zhao Wei Films; Fourier Films INC; Wild Orange Artists Inc.
- Distributed by: Goodfellas; ARP Sélection
- Release dates: 11 October 2024 (BIFF); 18 December 2024 (France)
- Running time: 105 minutes
- Countries: Japan; France; Singapore
- Languages: French; Japanese

Spirit World (French: Yōkai le monde des esprits) is a 2024 fantasy drama film directed by Eric Khoo. The film stars Catherine Deneuve as legendary singer Claire who flies to Japan for a final sold-out concert, but as the show comes to an end so does her worldly life. A France, Japan and Singapore co-production, the film premiered as closing film of 29th Busan International Film Festival on 11 October 2024.

== Cast ==
- Catherine Deneuve as Claire Emery
- Masaaki Sakai as Sabeenan Satheeskumar
- Denden
- Yutaka Takenouchi
- Jun Fubuki

== Production ==
The film, which is based on an original screenplay, is structured as a three-way production involving companies from Singapore, Japan and France. Singapore authorities supported the project financially. In January 2024, production began in Takasaki, an ancient town on Honshu Island between Tokyo and Kyoto, where it continued for 10 days, before moving to other locations.

== Release ==
Spirit World had its premiere at 29th Busan International Film Festival as closing film on October 11, 2024. It also competed for Best Film award at the 19th Rome Film Festival in 'Progressive Cinema Competition' and was screened on 22 October 2024.

It was screened at the 37th Tokyo International Film Festival in Gala Selection on 29 October 2024. The film was selected as the opening film of the Horizon section at the 35th Singapore International Film Festival and was screened on 30 November 2024.

The film was released on 26 February 2025 in French theatres by ARP Sélection.

Goodfellas, a Paris-based sales company acquired the international sales rights and launched the film at the European Film Market.

The film featured at the 72nd Sydney Film Festival in the Features section on 6 June 2025.

It was also screened in International Perspective at the São Paulo International Film Festival on 21 October 2025.

== Reception ==
Allan Hunter, reviewing for Screen Daily, called the film "A simple, sentimental tale with a tendency towards inoffensive whimsy." Closing his review, Hunter wrote, "The increasing focus on Hayato and his problems tends to push Claire and Yuzo to the sidelines of the story, but ultimately allow Khoo to create a more rounded tale of loss, love and just how precious a thing life can be."

== Accolades ==
Award	Date of ceremony	Category	Recipient(s)	Result	Ref.
Rome Film Festival	27 October 2024	Best Film	Spirit World	Nominated	
