= Girija: A Lifetime in Music =

2018 Hindi language documentary

- Directed by: Debapriya Adhikary; Samanwaya Sarkar; Sankalp Meshram
- Produced by: Madhu Chandra; Sudha Datta
- Release date: 2017
- Country: India
- Language: Hindi

Girija: A Lifetime in Music is a 2018 Hindi language documentary directed by Debapriya Adhikary, Samanwaya Sarkar and Sankalp Meshram and produced by Madhu Chandra and Sudha Datta. The film is the recipient of National Film Award for Best Arts/Cultural Film, awarded by the Government Of India. In 2018, it also received the Los Angeles Independent Film Festival award for Best Documentary Feature.

== Synopsis ==
The documentary showcases the life and contributions of Girija Devi to North Indian classical music. She was often referred to as 'Queen of Thumri.' She was the recipient of Padma Shri, Padma Bhushan and Padma Vibhushan. Debapriya Adhikary and Samanwaya Sarkar, who were her disciples, have directed the film.

== Event ==
In 2018 numerous classical musicians gathered at an auditorium to celebrate the 89th birthday of Girija Devi. The event was organised by the family members of her and began with the screening of a 12-minute video trailer of the documentary.

== Awards and nominations ==
Year	Ceremony	Category	Result	Ref.
2018	65th National Film Awards	National Film Award for Best Arts/Cultural Film	Won	
2018	Los Angeles Independent Film Festival	Best Documentary Feature	Won	
