= Mhorkya =

National Award winning Children's Marathi film

- Release poster
- Directed by: Amar Bharat Deokar
- Written by: Amar Bharat Deokar
- Produced by: Venkatesh Padal; Yuvraj Sarvade
- Starring: Raman Deokar; Amar Deokar
- Cinematography: Girish Jambhlikar
- Production company: Swastik Preeti Production
- Release date: 14 January 2018
- Language: Marathi

Mhorkya (lit. 'The leader') is a 2018 Marathi film directed by Amar Bharat Deokar and produced by Swastik Preeti Film Productions and co-produced by Amar Chitravani. It was bankrolled by Aespaes Lab and featured Raman Deokar and Amar Deokar in pivotal roles.

It won the National Film Award for Best Children's Film at the Indian 65th National Film Awards in 2018. It premiered on 14 January 2018 and was released worldwide on 24 January 2020.

== Plot ==
14-year-old Ashok (Ashya) is a shepherd who marches with his herds like he leads a parade and hates going to school. One day, his friends dragged him to school only to land him in the Republic Day parade practice session. But Ashya gets noticed for his powerful voice and is asked to compete for the parade’s leadership spot

His school rival Baalya, who wants to be the leader, threatens him to withdraw. Ashya wants to learn parade, but everyone refuses to teach him. His frantic search for the teacher begins with several options, but he finds the person he wants. A intellectually disabled soldier.

== Cast ==
- Raman Deokar as Ashya
- Aishwarya Kamble as Nikita
- Amar Bharat Deokar as Annya
- Yashraj Karhade as Baalya
- Anil Kamble as PT teacher
- Ramchandra Dhumal as Gomtar Aaba

== Marketing and release ==
Rajshri Marathi unveiled the official trailer of the film on 15 January 2020.

This film was released on 7 February 2020.

== Awards ==
- 65th National Film Award
1. National Film Award for Best Children's Film : Mhorkya
2. Special Mention: Raman Devkar (Child Artist)
3. Special Mention: Yasharaj Karhade (Child Artist)
- 16th Pune International Film Festival
1. Best Actor: Raman Devkar
2. Best Cinematography: Girish R.Jambhalikar
3. Audience Choice Movie: Mhorkya
- 7th Kolhapur International Film Festival 2019
1. Best Child Actor: Raman Devkar
2. Best Screenplay: Amar Deokar
