= Mayat =

Marathi-language Indian short film

- Directed by: Suyash Shinde
- Written by: Suyash Shinde
- Produced by: Strepto Focus Pictures
- Starring: Meenakshi Rathod, Kailash Waghmare
- Release date: 2017
- Running time: 26 minutes
- Country: India
- Language: Marathi

Mayat is a 2017 Marathi-language Indian short film written and directed by Suyash Shinde and produced by Strepto Focus Pictures. The film received the National Film Award for best short fiction film at the 65th National Film Awards in 2017. Set against a rural backdrop, the film addresses issues of poverty, survival, and morality through a narrative that balances irony and emotion.

== Cast ==
- Meenakshi Rathod as Ramee
- Kailash Waghmare as Naama

== Plot ==
Mayat tells the story of Namdev, a daily-wage laborer from a rural village who struggles to find work despite repeated efforts. With no food at home and mounting desperation, he discovers an unconventional way to survive, by collecting coins traditionally thrown during funeral processions. The film explores his internal conflict and the philosophical choices he must make between moral integrity and survival.

== Reception ==
Anupam Kant Verma from Firstpost rated the film 4 out of 5, praising its balanced blend of humor and depth. He highlighted Kailash Waghmare’s performance as Nama for its authenticity and emotional weight, and applauded director Suyash Shinde’s restrained, dignified storytelling that steers clear of melodrama.

== Awards ==
At the 65th National Film Awards in 2017, Mayat won the Best Short Fiction Film award. It also received the Best Script Award in the International Panorama section at the Jaipur International Film Festival.
