= Rima Das =

Indian filmmaker

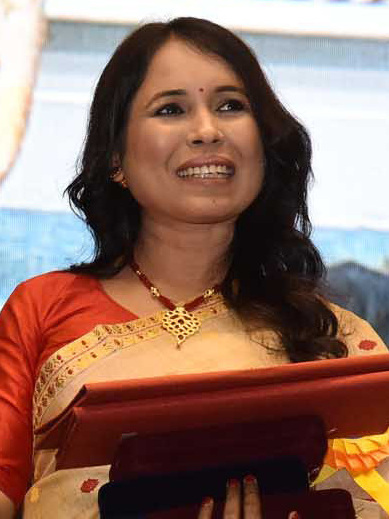
- Rima Das at 65th National Film Awards
- Born: Chaygaon, Assam, India
- Education: Cotton University; Pune University
- Occupations: Film director, film producer
- Notable work: Village Rockstars; Bulbul Can Sing

Rima Das is an Indian filmmaker best known for her 2017 film Village Rockstars, which won several national and international awards and became India's official entry for the 90th Academy Awards in the Best Foreign Language Film category. Chosen out of 28 other entries in India, it was also the first Assamese film to be submitted for Oscars. The film won India's National Award for Best Film and Best Editor.

In 2018, GQ India named Das as one of the 50 most influential young Indians of 2018. She is also one of the Brand Ambassadors of Toronto International Film Festival's Share Her Journey campaign that champions the cause of gender equality in cinema. She has been on the jury of Berlin International Film Festival Generation 14plus, Mumbai International Film Festival, Tallinn Black Nights Film Festival and Zlin Film Festival for Children & Youth.

A doctorate degree was conferred to Rima Das at the 3rd convocation of Krishna Kanta Handiqui State Open University (KKSHOU) held at the Srimanta Sankardeva International Auditorium in February 2018.

== Career ==
Das made her first short film, Pratha, in 2009. She started work on her first feature film Antardrishti (Man with the Binoculars), shot with a Canon DSLR camera in Kalardiya, in 2013. In 2016, Antardrishti was screened at the Mumbai Film Festival, and the Tallinn Black Nights Film Festival.

She became known as a one-woman crew, writing, directing, producing, editing, and shooting a film, besides handling art direction and costume designing. Das is not trained in any aspect of filmmaking. This, she believes has turned out to be a boon for her career:

The fact that I am not trained and I didn't go to a film school in a way helped me to explore more and to be true to my vision. Be it the writing, direction, cinematography or editing, I didn't follow a method trained professionals would. I could understand my craft better and create my own kind of cinema. Watching world cinema inspired me and gave me a perspective of global filmmaking. But I think having my own unique style helped me stand out.

Her second feature film, Village Rockstars (2017), which won several national and international awards. The film—written, directed, edited, and produced by Das—was India's official entry for the 90th Academy Awards in the Best Foreign Language Film category. The film, chosen out of 28 other entries in India, is also the first Assamese film to be submitted for Oscar consideration. She won India's National Award for Best Film and Best Editor, announced on 13 April 2018 by a Government of India appointed jury headed by filmmaker Shekhar Kapoor. Village Rockstars is the second Assamese film to get national recognition after Jahnu Barua's Halodhia Choraye Baodhan Khai (The Catastrophe). The film traces the story of Dhunu, a girl from a village in Assam who dreams of owning a guitar and forming a rock band.

Her 2018 film, Bulbul Can Sing, was premiered at the Toronto International Film Festival. That year, GQ India named Das as one of the 50 most influential young Indians of 2018. A doctorate degree has been conferred to Rima Das at the 3rd convocation of Krishna Kanta Handiqui State Open University (KKSHOU) held at the Srimanta Sankardeva International Auditorium in February 2018.

She directed a short film called For Each Other in 2019, which premiered at the 3rd Pingyao International Film Festival, and directed her first documentary fiction film, Sunshine Dreamers.

In 2022, her new film Tora’s Husband had its World Premiere at Toronto International Film Festival, where it was selected to compete in the Platform section. It is the first Indian film to be showcased in the category. Rima Das talks about her journey making the film: "In the midst of loss, lockdowns and life, we shot the film over two years in real locations and natural conditions. Shooting this film was more challenging than shooting my previous films because the pandemic restricts you in many ways. There was this constant feeling of fear and restlessness, which my characters also depict. But I knew I just had to shoot this film, as this time will become history one day".

== Influences ==
As a filmmaker, she is influenced by master filmmakers Satyajit Ray, Ingmar Bergman, and Majid Majidi.

== Personal life ==
Das hails from the village Kalardiya near Chhaygaon in Assam, 50 km southwest of Guwahati. She is the daughter of a teacher. She cleared the National Eligibility Test (NET) after her Masters in Sociology at Pune University. But the desire to be an actor took her to Mumbai in 2003. She acted in plays, including an adaptation of Premchand's Godaan staged at the Prithvi Theatre.

== Filmography ==
- Pratha (Short film)
- Man with the Binoculars : Antardrishti (2016)
- Village Rockstars (2017)
- Bulbul Can Sing (2018)
- For Each Other (Part of the anthology 'Neighbors', 2019)
- Sunshine Dreamers (2019)
- Tora's Husband (2022)
- Village Rockstars 2 (2024), The film premiered at the 29th Busan International Film Festival and won the KIM Jiseok Award.
- My Melbourne (2024)
- Not a Hero (2026)

== See also ==
- List of female film and television directors
- List of LGBT-related films directed by women
