= Amar Deokar =

- Born: Mardi, Barshi, Maharashtra, India
- Notable work: Mhorkya
- Awards: National Film Award for Best Children's Film

Amar Deokar is an Indian film director, actor, screenwriter and producer.

== Career ==
In 2018 Deokar released his debut film, the Marathi feature film Mhorkya, which he wrote, acted in, and co-produced. Mhorkya was awarded the National Film Award for Best Children's Film, and a Filmfare Award for Best Debut Director.
