= 1984, When the Sun Didn't Rise =

2018 documentary film

When The Sun Didn’t Rise
- Directed by: Teenaa Kaur Pasricha
- Written by: Teenaa Kaur Pasricha
- Release date: 2018
- Country: India
- Language: Punjabi

1984, When The Sun Didn’t Rise is a 2018 documentary film directed by Teenaa Kaur Pasricha, that delves into the lives of women residing in Delhi's Widow Colony. This colony provides a home to the widows of Sikh men who lost their lives during the 1984 Sikh Genocide. The film received several awards nationally and internationally including the National Film Award for Best Investigative Film in 2018.

The film was screened at various locations throughout the city of London. The screenings began on 7 February at University College London and included various educational institutions and gurdwaras. The final screening took place on 14 March 2018 at Coventry University. Sikh Youth UK, ‘Nishan,’ and the National Sikh Youth Federation (NSYF) jointly organized this screening.

== Production ==
The documentary was in production for five years and received partial funding from the Busan International Film Festival's Asian Network and Documentary Fund, along with support from the Leipzig International Festival for Documentary and Animated Films through their Doc Wok fellowship. The film was initially screened at the International Documentary and Short Film Festival of Kerala on 18 June 2017.

== Reception ==
Sonal Pandya of Cinestaan awarded the film 3 stars out of 5 and stated "The impassioned documentary highlights the director’s quest to uncover the forgotten, broken lives of the widows of 1984."

Damini Kulkarni from Scroll wrote "Teenaa Kaur Pasricha’s ‘1984, When The Sun Didn’t Rise’ revisits the aftermath of the Delhi riots that followed the assassination of Indira Gandhi."

== Accolades ==
The documentary was awarded the Asian Network and Documentary (AND) Fund by the Busan International Film Festival in 2015. It was also selected for the Work in Progress Lab at the Dok Leipzig International Festival for Documentary and Animated Films in Germany in 2014. In addition, the documentary received the 'BEST DOCU. FEATURE award' at the DC Asia Pacific Film Festival in the USA on 18 March 2017. The film had its premiere in India at IDSFFK Kerala on 18 June 2017.
