= Kalardiya =

Kalardiya Dohgaon Kalardiya
- Village
- Location in Assam, India Kalardiya (India)
- Coordinates: 26.1574996°N 91.2163693°E
- Country: India
- State: Assam
- Region: Western Assam
- District: Kamrup rural

Government
  - Body: Gram panchayat
- Elevation: 42 m (138 ft)

Languages
  - Official: Assamese
  - Native: Kamrupi dialects
- Time zone: UTC+5:30 (IST)
- Postal code: 781127
- Website: kamrup.nic.in

Kalardiya, also "Dohgaon Kalardiya" is a village in Kamrup rural district of Western Assam. It is located at south bank of river Brahmaputra.

== Culture ==
=== Language ===
Like rest of Kamrup region, Kamrupi dialects are spoken in Kalardia.

=== Festivals ===
Domahi, Amati, Durga Puja, Kali Puja (Shyama Puja), Diwali, Holi, Janmastami, Shivratri etc. are major festivals of the village.

== Transport ==
The village is well connected to Chaygaon town and National Highway 17 by regular buses and other modes of transport.

== See also ==
- Bihdia
- Nahira
