= 29th Busan International Film Festival =

2024 edition of film festival

- BIFF official poster
- Opening film: Uprising by Kim Sang-man
- Closing film: Spirit World by Eric Khoo
- Location: Busan Cinema Center
- Founded: 1995
- Awards: New Currents Award: The Land Of Morning Calm; Kim Jiseok Award: Village Rockstars 2 by Rima Das; Korean Film Achievement Award: Lee Sun-kyun
- Hosted by: Supported by: Ministry of Culture, Sports and Tourism; Metropolitan City of Busan; Korean Film Council
- No. of films: 278
- Festival date: Opening: October 2, 2024; Closing: October 11, 2024
- Website: www.biff.kr/eng/

Busan International Film Festival
- 30th 28th

The 29th Busan International Film Festival (Korean: 제29회 부산국제영화제) opened on October 2, 2024 at the Busan Cinema Center in Busan, with South Korean film Uprising by Kim Sang-man, and screened 278 films from 63 countries, including 224 officially invited films and 54 community beef screenings. Park Bo-young and Ahn Jae-hong hosted the opening ceremony.

Mohammad Rasoulof, an Iranian film director was chosen as president of the competitive section 'New Currents' jury. The festival this year announced a Special Program in Focus, 'In Memory of Lee Sun-kyun' who died on December 27, 2023, and was known for his role in the Oscar winning film Parasite. He will also posthumously receive the Korean Film Achievement Award.

The festival closed with the ceremony hosted by Gong Myung and Choi Soo-young. Spirit World, a fantasy-drama film directed by Singapore's Eric Khoo and starring French actress Catherine Deneuve was screened as closing film.

On closing day, the main award of the festival New Currents Award was awarded to the South Korean film The Land Of Morning Calm by Park Yi-woong, set among inhabitants of a rural coastal community; and a co-production film Ma – Cry of Silence by The Maw Nang, a film about a young Burmese woman who moves to the big city to work in a garment factory.

== Overview ==
The film registration for the festival began in March 2024 with the closing date for submission fixed for July 17, 2024.

The poster for 29th edition of the festival was unveiled on August 27, 2024. Based on the motif of numerous waves powerfully rising in the ocean of films, symbolically capturing the diverse waves of films, each with their own story, the art director Choi Soon-dae, who has been working as an art director since the 2nd Busan International Film Festival planned and designed it. According to the director Choi Soon-dae, "The image of the ocean, a space of infinite possibilities, and waves of different colors coming together is so vivid that it seems to visualize a fleeting moment of the Busan International Film Festival."

This year documentary filmmakers competed for a new prize, an audience award for feature documentaries. The prize was given to a single documentary feature competing within "Wide Angle – Documentary" section of the festival.

The titles for New Currents and Jiseok, the competitive sections were announced on August 27, 2024. New Currents is a section for first and second films by up-and-coming Asian filmmakers, whereas Jiseok section selects films from Asian directors with more than three feature films to their credit and honours two such directors with Jiseok awards. On September 3, BIFF unveiled full line-up for its 2024 edition and announced Kiyoshi Kurosawa the winner of Asian Filmmaker of the Year award. The opening film of the festival was Kim Sang-man's Uprising and closing film Eric Khoo's France, Singapore, Japan co-production Spirit World, a fantasy film starring French actress Catherine Deneuve.

From this edition, the "Camellia Award" was introduced, named after Busan’s city flower, the camellia. This award, established with the involvement of Chanel, aims to raise the status of women in the film industry. Ryu Seong-hie, South Korean film art director is the first recipient of the award.

The eve event to wish the success of the festival was held on October 1, at the outdoor stage of BIFF Square in Jung-gu, Busan. The event hosted by South Korean actress, singer-songwriter, director and artist Ku Hye-sun and creator Lee Seung-guk had celebratory performances by singer Won Mi-yeon, and DJ 'New Jinsnim's' DJing. In the event, South Korean actor Cho Jin-woong, who was selected as the ‘Actor Beloved by Busan’ this year, received a plaque of appreciation, and a handprint unveiling ceremony for Hong Kong actor and filmmaker Chow Yun-fat, who visited the festival last year, was also held.

== Jury ==
=== New Currents Award ===
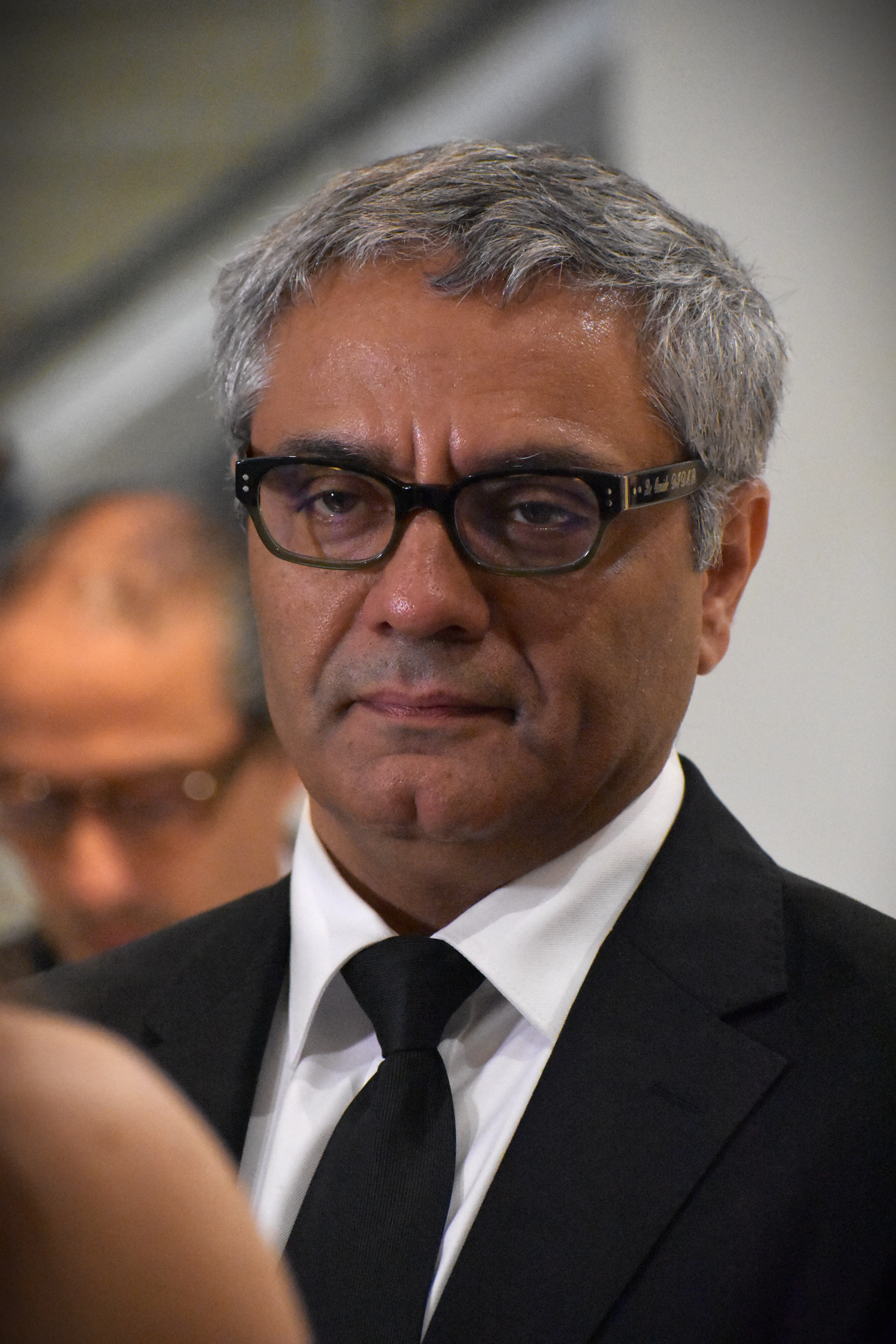
Mohammad Rasoulof, Chairman of jury

- Mohammad Rasoulof, Iranian independent filmmaker who lives in exile in Europe, (Chairman of jury)
- Lee Myung-se, South Korean filmmaker
- Zhou Dongyu, Chinese actress
- Kani Kusruti, Indian actress and model
- Vanja Kaludjercic, Croatia-born festival programmer, festival director, International Film Festival Rotterdam

=== Kim Jiseok Award ===
- Christian Jeune, French, director of Film Department at the Cannes Film Festival
- Prasanna Vithanage, Sri Lankan, filmmaker
- Shin Su-won, South Korean film director and screenwriter

=== BIFF Mecenat Award ===
- Mohsen Makhmalbaf, Iranian documentary film director
- Fuzioka Asako, Japanese, chairman of Yamagata International Documentary Film Festival
- Jéro Yun, South Korean film director

=== Sonje Award ===
- Yamanaka Yoko, Japanese director
- Constance Tsang, Chinese American filmmaker based in New York
- Lim Dae-hyung, South Korean film director and screenwriter

=== FIPRESCI ===
- Teréz VINCZE, Hungarian film professor
- WANG Hsin, Taiwanese writer
- RHEE Souewon, Chair of South Korean FIPRESCI

=== NETPAC ===
- IGARASHI Kohei, Japanese director
- Herman VAN EYKEN, Belgium film professor
- KIM Miyoung, South Korean director

=== DGK PLUS M Award ===
- Kim Lokk-young, South Korean director
- Lee Dong-eun, South Korean film director and screenwriter
- Lee Ho-jae, South Korean film director and screenwriter

=== KBS Independent Film Awards ===
- Junh Sung-il, South Korean film critic, director
- Choi Kook-hee, South Korean producer
- An Eun-mi, South Korean film producer

=== CGK Cinematography Award ===
- Park Jung-hun, South Korean cinematographer
- Sung Seung-taek, South Korean cinematographer
- Cho Yong-kyou, South Korean cinematographer

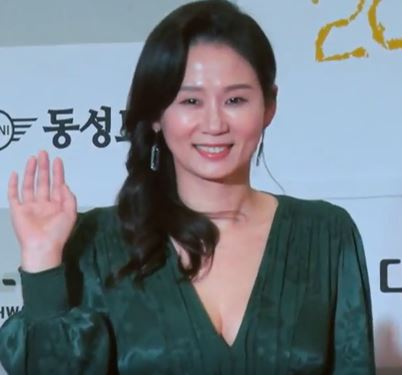
Kim Sun-young, Actor of the Year Award jury member

=== Critic B Award ===
- Kim Young-gwang, South Korean film critic
- Han Changwook, South Korean film critic
- Ham Yoon-jeong, South Korean film critic

=== Actor of the Year Award ===
- Kim Sun-young, South Korean actress
- Ryu Jun-yeol, South Korean actor

Yoo Ji-tae, Lee Chun-yeon Film Impression Award jury member

=== Lee Chun-yeon Film Impression Award ===
- Kang Je-ky South Korean film director.
- Shim Jae-myung South Korean, CEO of Myung Films
- Yoo Ji-tae, South Korean actor
- Kwon Young-rak, South Korean producer
- Jung Han-seok, South Korean, festival advisor

== Opening and closing ceremonies ==
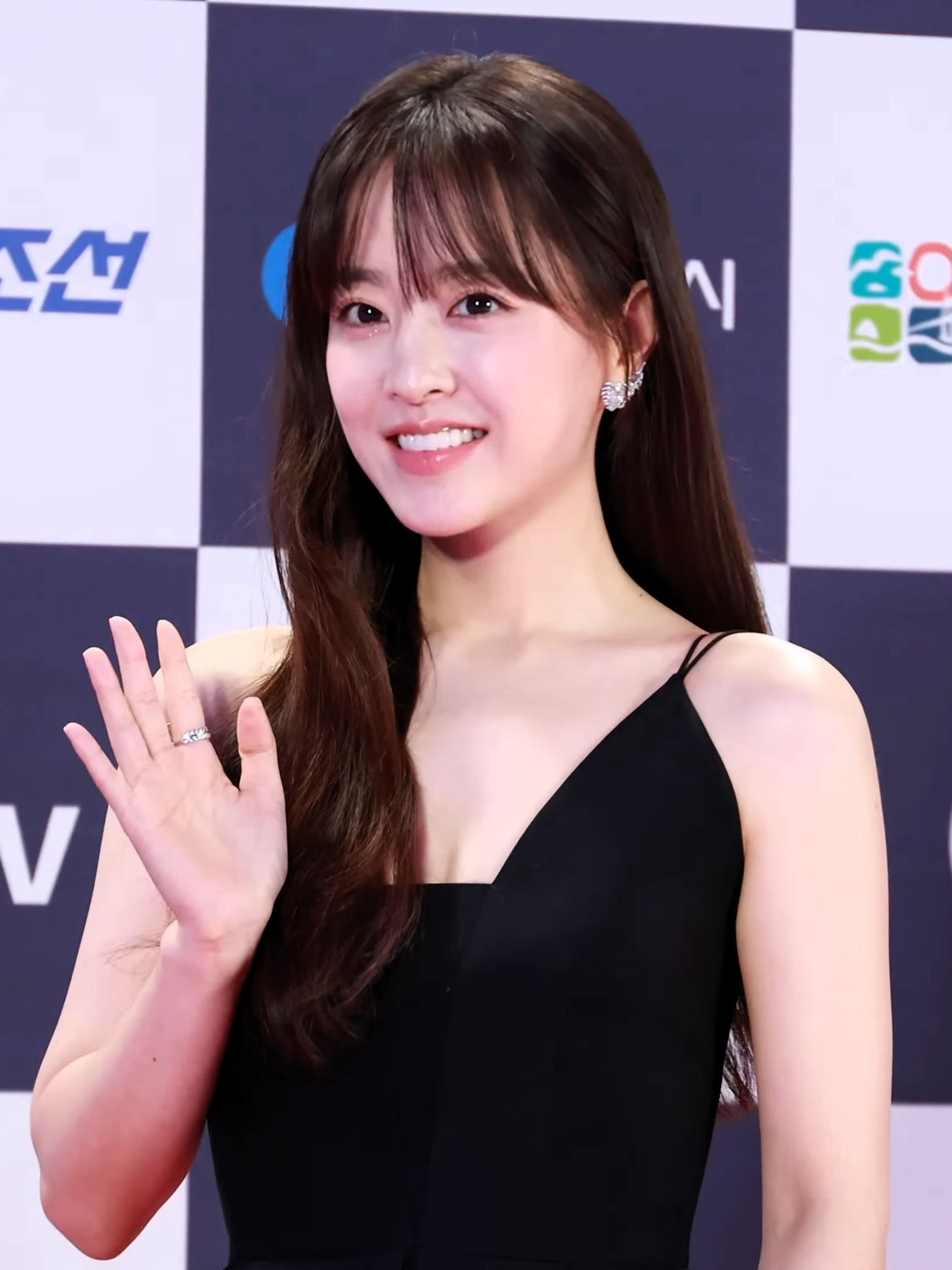
Park Bo-young, MC of the opening ceremony

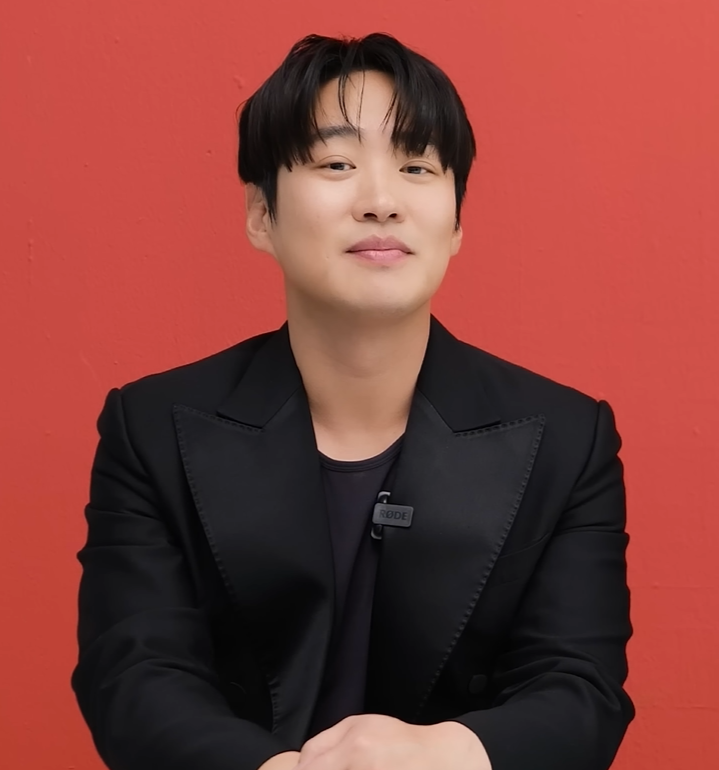
Ahn Jae-hong, MC of the opening ceremony

Opening ceremony of the festival was held at Busan Cinema Center Outdoor Theater on October 2 and broadcast live on Naver TV. Park Bo-young and Ahn Jae-hong hosted the opening ceremony attended by the Korean and international stars from the film industry. Kiyoshi Kurosawa was presented the Asian Filmmaker of the Year award, whereas Ryu Seong-hie, a South Korean film art director was honoured with Camellia Award, which named after Busan’s city flower, the camellia, introduced this year with the involvement of Chanel and aims to raise the status of women in the film industry. A video commemorating the late Lee Sun-kyun, the recipient of the Korean Film Achievement Award was played.

=== Closing ceremony ===
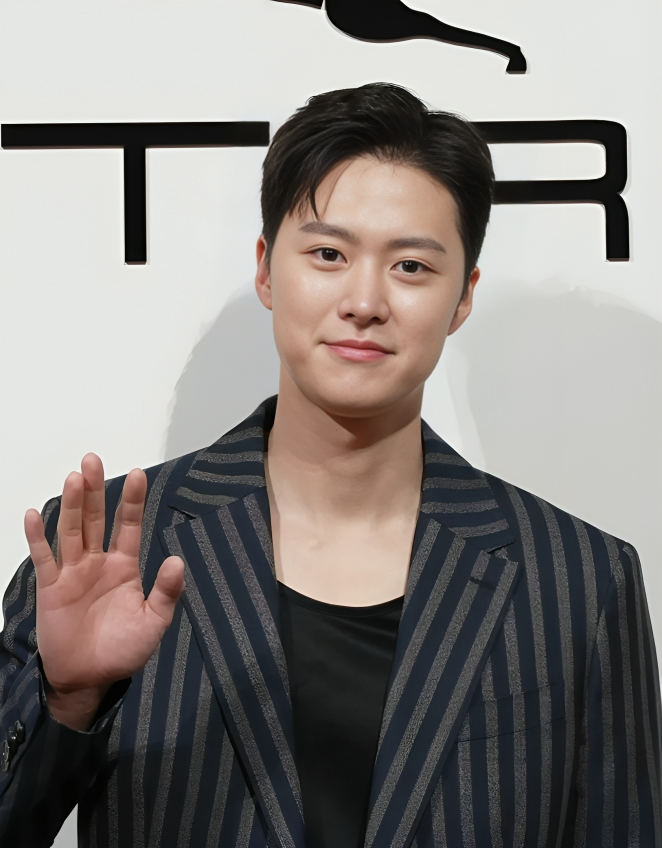
Gong Myung

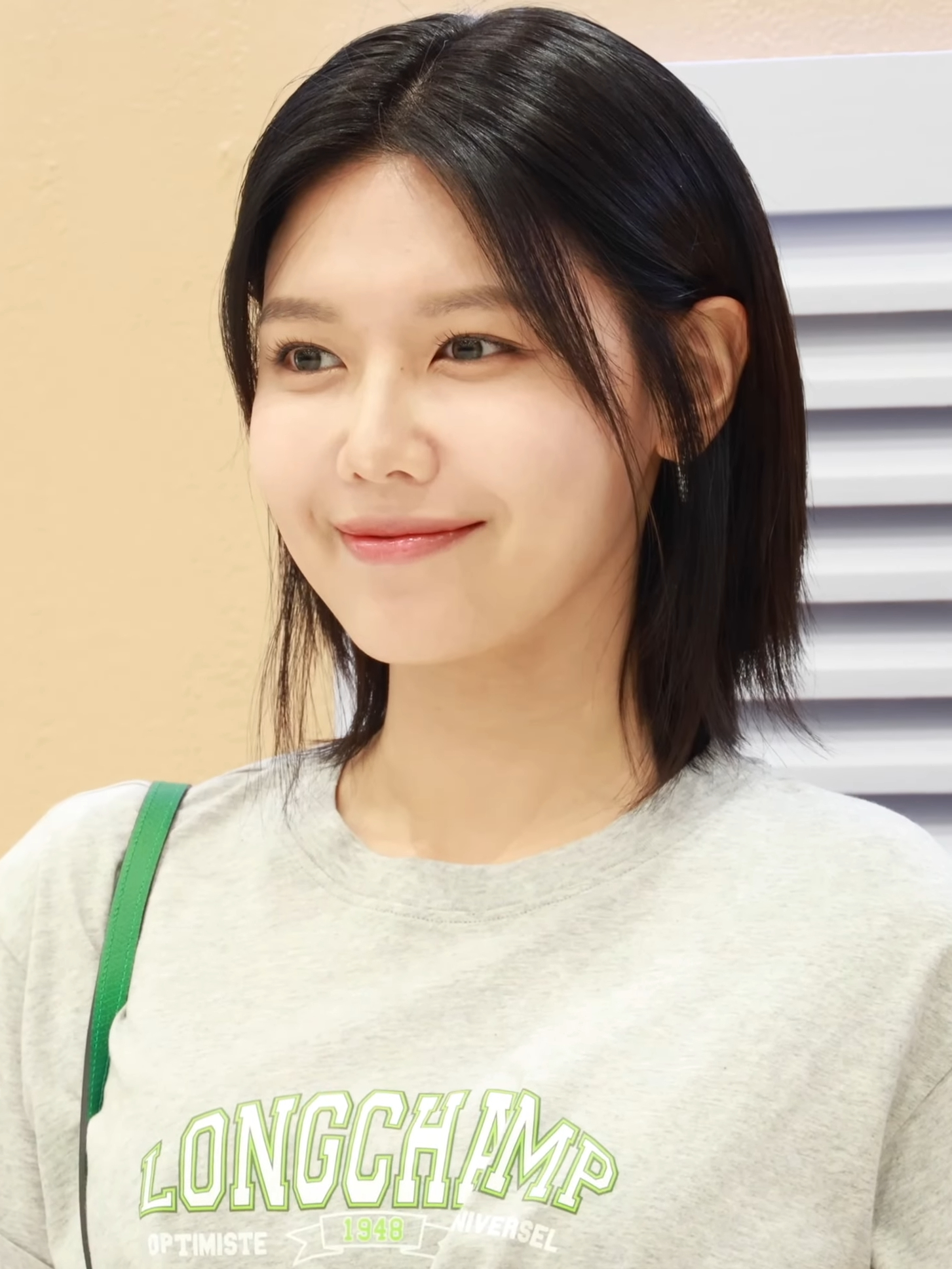
Choi Soo-young

MCs of the closing ceremony

Gong Myung and Choi Soo-young acted as master of ceremonies of closing ceremony held at Busan Cinema Center Outdoor Theater on October 11. According to the Busan Film Festival Organizing Committee, 278 films, including 224 official from 63 countries and 54 community BIFF screenings were showcased. 145,238 people watched the event. The festival closed with Spirit World, a fantasy-drama film directed by Singapore's Eric Khoo and starring French actress Catherine Deneuve.

== Events ==
- Actors House: In this edition the following actors shared unknown behind-the-scenes stories and their future plans with the audience:
  - Sul Kyung-gu
  - Park Bo-young
  - Hwang Jung-min
  - Chun Woo-hee

Actors House was held from October 3 to 6 at Culture Hall, 9F, Shinsegae, Centum City.

- Master class:
  - Ann Hui, Hong Kong film director, producer, screenwriter and actress
  - Miguel Gomes, Portuguese film director
  - Kiyoshi Kurosawa, Japanese film director, screenwriter, film critic, author, actor, and professor

Master classes was held from October 3 to 6 at 11F Conference Hall, Busan Film & Audio Visual Industry Center

- Open Talk: The open talk will be held from October 3 to 9 at BIFF Outdoor Stage, Busan Cinema Center. Directors and actors of the official selection to the festival will freely communicate with the audience for about 50 minutes.
- Talk-to-Talk: Vivid Stories from Directors and Actors: Talk-to-Talk: Vivid Stories from Directors and Actors of 36 films in about an hour session with the audience, will be held from October 6 to 9 at 6F Talk-to-Talk Lounge, Cine mountain, Busan Cinema Center.
- Hand printing: Hand printing event will be attended by Miguel Gomes, winner of the Best Director Award at the Cannes Film Festival. The event was held on October 4, after the screening of his film Grand Tour at Haneulyeon Theater, Busan Cinema Center.
- Special talk: Special Talks to commemorate the late actor Lee Sun-kyun, joined by actors and directors with whom he collaborated in his major works selected for the Special Program in Focus was held On October 3 and 4, at Lotte Cinema, Centum City.
- Outdoor stage greetings: Meet the Directors and Cast:- Directors and cast members of the official selections introduce their film. Each event for 20 minutes, will take place from October 3 to 5 at BIFF Theater, Busan Cinema Center.
- 2024 Asia Contents Awards & Global OTT Awards: The awards ceremony to recognise the achievements of excellent content made for TV, OTT, and online across Asia, took place on October 6, 2024, at BIFF Theater, Busan Cinema Center, Busan, South Korea.

== Program sections ==
The festival has following sections:

- Gala Presentation
- Icons
- New Currents
- Jiseok
- A Window on Asian Cinema
- Korean Cinema Today Vision Section
- Korean Cinema Today - Special Premiere
- Korean Cinema Today - Panorama
- World Cinema
- Flash Forward
- Wide Angle
- Open Cinema
- Midnight Passion
- On Screen
- Special Program in Focus
  - In Memory of Lee Sun-kyun
  - Miguel Gomes, a filmmaker of Joyful Melancholy
  - Teenage Minds, Teenage Movies
  - Special Screening

=== Opening and closing films ===
English title	Original title	Director(s)	Production country(ies)
Opening film
Uprising	전,란	Kim Sang-man	South Korea
Closing film
Spirit World		Eric Khoo	France, Singapore, Japan

=== Gala Presentation ===
English title	Original title	Director(s)	Production country(ies)
Caught by the Tides	风流一代	Jia Zhangke	China
Cloud	クラウド	Kiyoshi Kurosawa	Japan
Grand Tour		Miguel Gomes	Portugal, Italy, France
Serpent′s Path	Le chemin du serpent	Kiyoshi Kurosawa	France, Japan
Visiting Hours	La Prisonnière de Bordeaux	Patricia Mazuy	France

=== Icons ===
English title	Original title	Director(s)	Production country(ies)
A Traveler's Needs	여행자의 필요	Hong Sang-soo	South Korea
Anora		Sean Baker	United States
Emilia Pérez		Jacques Audiard	France, Mexico
Here Children Do Not Play Together		Mohsen Makhmalbaf	Iran, United Kingdom
It's Not Me	C'est Pas Moi	Leos Carax	France
Limonov: The Ballad		Kirill Serebrennikov	France, Italy, Spain
If I May - Chapter II	Se posso permettermi - Capitolo II	Marco Bellocchio	Italy
Meeting with Pol Pot	Rendez-vous avec Pol Pot	Rithy Panh	France, Cambodia, Taiwan, Qatar, Turkey
Misericordia	Miséricorde	Alain Guiraudie	France, Portugal, Spain
Phantosmia		Lav Diaz	Philippines
Suspended Time	Hors du temps	Olivier Assayas	France
The Empire	L'Empire	Bruno Dumont	France / Germany / Italy / Belgium / Portugal
The Room Next Door	La habitación de al lado	Pedro Almodóvar	Spain
The Seed of the Sacred Fig	دانه‌ی انجیر معابد	Mohammad Rasoulof	Iran, France, Germany
Three Friends	Trois amies	Emmanuel Mouret	France
Youth (Hard Times)	青春：苦	Wang Bing	France, Luxembourg, Netherlands
Youth (Homecoming)	青春：归	Wang Bing	France, Luxembourg, Netherlands

=== New Currents ===
The selected titles are eligible for multiple awards, including the New Currents Award, the FIPRESCI Award, the NETPAC Award, and the KB New Currents Audience Award.

Highlighted title indicates award winner

English title	Original title	Director(s)	Production country(ies)
Able		Elzak Eskendir	Kazakhstan
As the River Goes By	水东游	Charles Hu	China
For Rana		Iman Yazadi	Iran
The Height of the Coconut Trees		Du Jie	Japan
Kaneko's Commissar		Furukawa Go	Japan
The Land of Morning Calm	아침바다 갈매기는	Park Yi-woong	South Korea
MA - Cry of Silence		The Maw Nang	Myanmar, Korea, Singapore, France, Norway, Qatar
Montages of a Modern Motherhood	虎毒不	Oliver Chan	Hong Kong
Tale of the Land		Loeloe Hendra	Indonesia, Philippines, Qatar
Waterdrop	수연의 선율	Choi Jong-yong	South Korea

=== Jiseok ===
This section selected films from Asian directors with a portfolio of more than three feature films, and from the line-up of eight films, two were honoured with Jiseok awards.

Highlighted title indicates award winner

English title	Original title	Director(s)	Production country(ies)
Aimitagai	アイミタガイ	Kusano Shogo	Japan
Deal at the Border		Dastan Zhapar Ryskeldi	Kyrgyzstan
I Am Love	아이 엠 러브	Baek Sung-bin	South Korea
Motherland		Brillante Mendoza	Philippines
So It Goes	뭐 그런 거지	Lee Ha-ram	South Korea
Travelling Alone		Ishibashi Yuho	Japan
Village Rockstars 2		Rima Das	India
Yen and Ai-Lee	小雁與吳愛麗	Tom Lin Shu-yu	Taiwan

=== A Window on Asian Cinema ===
English title	Original title	Director(s)	Production country(ies)
All We Imagine as Light		Payal Kapadia	India, France, Italy, Luxembourg, Netherlands
Black Dog	狗阵	Guan Hu	China
Blue Sea		Song Jinxiao	China
Blue Sun Palace		Constance Tsang	United States
Crocodile Tears		Tumpal Tampubolon	Indonesia, France, Singapore, Germany
Desert of Namibia	ナミビアの砂漠	Yôko Yamanaka	Japan
Don't Cry, Butterfly	Mưa trên cánh bướm	Duong Dieu Linh	Vietnam, Singapore, Philippines, Indonesia
How to Make Millions Before Grandma Dies	หลานม่า	Pat Boonnitipat	Thailand
In Retreat		Maisam Ali	India, France
Land of Broken Hearts	负负得正	Wen Shipei	China
Mongrel	白衣蒼狗	Chiang Wei Liang and You Qiao Yin	Taiwan
My Favourite Cake	Keyk-e mahboob-e man	Maryam Moqadam, Behtash Sanaeeha	Iran, France, Sweden, Germany
Pierce	Cì xīn qiè gŭ	Nelicia Low	Singapore, Taiwan, Poland
Pooja, Sir		Deepak Rauniyar	Nepal, United States, Norway
Regretfully at Dawn		Sivaroj Kongsakul	Thailand, Singapore
Saba		Maksud Hossain	Bangladesh
Sad Letters of an Imaginary Woman		Nidhi Saxena	India
Santosh		Sandhya Suri	India, France, Germany, United Kingdom
Second Chance		Subhadra Mahajan	India
Soldier of Love		Farkhat Sharipov	Kazakhstan
State of Statelessness		Tenzin Tsetan Choklay, Sonam Tseten, Tenzing Sonam, Ritu Sarin, Tsering Tashi Gyalthang	India, United States, Vietnam
Super Happy Forever		Igarashi Kohei	France, Japan
The Colors Within	きみの色	Naoko Yamada	Japan
The Hearing		Lawrence Fajardo	Philippines
The Witness	Shahed	Nader Saeivar	Germany, Austria
To Kill a Mongolian Horse	一匹白马的热梦	Jiang Xiaoxuan	Malaysia, Hong Kong, South Korea, Japan, United States
Travesty		Batsukh Baatar	Mongolia
Viet and Nam	Trong lòng đất	Minh Quý Trương	Vietnam, Philippines, Singapore, France, Netherlands

=== Korean Cinema Today - Vision Section ===
This year 12 films were showcased as world premiere.

English title	Original title	Director(s)
The face of Hwanhee	환희의 얼굴	Lee Jea-han
The Final Semester	3학년 2학기	Lee Ran-hee
Fragment	파편	Kim Sung-yoon
Humming	허밍	Lee Seung-jae
Inserts	인서트	Lee Jong-su
Journey to Face Them	그를 마주하는 시간	Hwang In-won
Kike Will Hit a Home Run	키케가 홈런을 칠거야	Park Song-yeol
Merely Known as Something Else	다른 것으로 알려질 뿐이지	Jo Hee-young
Red Nails	홍이	Hwang Seul-gi
Spring Night	봄밤	Kang Mi-ja
Tango at Dawn	새벽의 Tango	Kim Hyo-eun
The Waves of Winter	파동	Lee Hanju

=== Korean Cinema Today - Special Premiere ===
This year, the section will screen five films, including four world premieres.

English title	Original title	Director(s)
A Girl with Closed Eyes	폭로: 눈을 감은 아이	Jeon Seon-yeong
A Normal Family	보통의 가족	Hur Jin-ho
Bogota: City of the Lost	보고타	Kim Seong-je
Don't Touch Dirty Money	더러운 돈에 손대지 마라	Kim Min-soo
Hear Me: Our Summer	청설	Jo Seon-ho

=== Korean Cinema Today - Panorama ===
English title	Original title	Director(s)
12.12: The Day	서울의 봄	Kim Sung-su
Method Acting	메소드 연기	Lee Ki-hyuk
Revolver	리볼버	Oh Seung-uk
Somebody	침범	Kim Yeo-jung, Lee Jung-chan
The Killers		Kim Jong-kwan, Roh Deok, Jang Hang-jun, Lee Myung-se
You Are the Apple of My Eye	그 시절, 우리가 좋아했던 소녀	Cho Young-myoung

=== World Cinema ===
English title	Original title	Director(s)	Production country(ies)
A Real Pain		Jesse Eisenberg	United States, Poland
And Their Children After Them		Ludovic and Zoran Boukherma	France
April		Dea Kulumbegashvili	Georgia, France, Italy
Armand		Halfdan Ullmann Tøndel	Norway, Netherlands, Germany, Sweden
Dad Croaked on Saturday		Zaka Abdrakhmanova	Russia, Kazakhstan
Dog on Trial	Le Procès du chien	Laetitia Dosch	Switzerland, France
Dying	Sterben	Matthias Glasner	Germany
Familia		Francesco Costabile	Italy
Ghostlight		Alex Thompson, Kelly O'Sullivan	United States
Gloria!		Margherita Vicario	Italy, Switzerland
Grey Bees		Dmytro Moiseiev	Ukraine
Harvest		Athina Rachel Tsangari	United Kingdom, Germany, Greece, France, United States
Julie Keeps Quiet	Julie zwijgt	Leonardo Van Dijl	Belgium, Sweden
Kill the Jockey	El jockey	Luis Ortega	Argentina, Spain
Kneecap		Rich Peppiatt	Ireland, United Kingdom
Love	Kjærlighet	Dag Johan Haugerud	Norway
Of Dogs and Men	Al Klavim Veanashim	Dani Rosenberg	Israel, Italy
Sasquatch Sunset		David Zellner and Nathan Zellner	United States
Souleymane's Story	L'Histoire de Souleymane	Boris Lojkine	France
The Damned	Les Damnés	Roberto Minervini	Belgium, Italy, United States
The Girl with the Needle	Pigen med nålen	Magnus von Horn	Denmark, Poland, Sweden
The Other Way Around	Volveréis	Jonás Trueba	Spain, France
The Quiet Son	Jouer Avec le Feu	Delphine and Muriel Coulin	France
The Sparrow in the Chimney	Der Spatz im Kamin	Ramon Zürcher	Switzerland
There's Still Tomorrow	C'è ancora domani	Paola Cortellesi	Italy
Universal Language	Une Langue universelle	Matthew Rankin	Canada
Vermiglio		Maura Delpero	Italy, France, Belgium
When the Light Breaks	Ljósbrot	Rúnar Rúnarsson	Iceland, Netherlands
Wild Diamond	Diamant brut	Agathe Riedinger	France

=== Open Cinema ===
The outdoor theater screens a selection of new and internationally recognized films, including both popular and art-house productions.

English title	Original title	Director(s)	Production country(ies)
Civil War		Alex Garland	United States, United Kingdom
Flow		Gints Zilbalodis	Belgium, France, Latvia
Ghost Cat Anzu	化け猫あんずちゃん	Yôko Kuno and Nobuhiro Yamashita	Japan
I Am the Secret in Your Heart	夏日的檸檬草	Lai Meng Chieh	Taiwan
Kalki 2898 AD		Nag Ashwin	India
RM: Right People, Wrong Place		Lee Seok-jun	South Korea
The Solitary Gourmet	Kodoku no Gourmet	Yutaka Matsushige	Japan

=== Flash Forward ===
English title	Original title	Director(s)	Production country(ies)
Anywhere Anytime		Milad Tangshir	Italy
Do I Know You from Somewhere?		Arianna Martinez	Canada
Holy Cow	Vingt Dieux!	Louise Courvoisier	France
Memories of a Burning Body		Antonella Sudasassi Furniss	Costa Rica, Spain
Mr. K		Tallulah H. Schwab	Netherlands, Belgium
On Becoming a Guinea Fowl		Rungano Nyoni	Ireland, United Kingdom, United States, Zambia
Paul & Paulette Take a Bath		Jethro MASSEY	United Kingdom
The End		Joshua Oppenheimer	Denmark, Germany, Ireland, Italy, United Kingdom, Sweden
The Village Next to Paradise		Mo Harawe	Austria, France, Somalia

=== Wide Angle ===
==== Korean Short Film Competition ====
Highlighted title indicates award winner

English title	Original title	Director(s)
By Hand		You Jun-sang
Dive		Heo Dahe
Driver		Kim Ki-ik
Escape Velocity		Park Se-yong
Just Another Film		Jung Bit-areum
Lost Target		Kim Dongeun
MICHELLE		Park Syeyoung
Night Walkers		Lim Lee-rang
The Dream with Sofa		Nam Yeon-woo
Variation		Park Jihoon
WavyWavy		Kim Ye-won
Yurim		Song Ji-seo

==== Asian Short Film Competition ====
Highlighted title indicates award winner

English title	Original title	Director(s)	Production country(s)
A Garden in Winter		Eléonore Mahmoudian, Matsui Hiroshi	Japan, France
Ash Valley: Janyl		Shu Zhu	Kyrgyzstan, Canada
Blue Boy		Nik Dodani	United States, India
Lao San		Wang Ziming	China
Lucky Dog		Ujwal NAIR	India
Shoredust		P. R. Monencillo Patindol	Philippines
Suintrah		Ayesha Alma Almera	Indonesia
The Black Dog		Yang Ling	Taiwan
The Last Day		Farzad Samimi	Iran
threefor100: or the thrifting of love and various other things		Cedrick Labadia	Philippines

==== Short Film Showcase ====
English title	Original title	Director(s)	Production country(s)
Magic Candies		Nishio Daisuke	Japan

==== Documentary Competition ====
Highlighted title indicates award winner

English title	Original title	Director(s)	Production country(s)
A Fly on the Wall		Shonali Bose	India
Ainu Puri		Takeshi Fukunaga	Japan, United States
Another Home		Frankie Sin	Taiwan, Hong Kong, China, France
At the Park		Sohn Koo-yong	South Korea
Every Single Dot		Lee So-jeong	South Korea
Gingerbread for Her Dad		Alina Mustafina	Kazakhstan
K-Number		Jo Seyoung	South Korea
Ms. Hu′s Garden		Pan Zhiqi	China
The First Responders		Ryu Hyung-seok	South Korea
Works and Days		Park Min-soo, Ahn Kearn-hyung	South Korea

==== Documentary Showcase ====
English title	Original title	Director(s)	Production country(ies)
Black Box Diaries		Ito Shiori	Japan, United Kingdom, United States
Dahomey		Mati Diop	France, Senegal, Benin
Ernest Cole: Lost and Found		Raoul Peck	France, United States
Israel Palestine on Swedish TV 1958–1989	Israel Palestina pa Svensk TV 1958–1989	Göran Hugo Olsson	Sweden, Finland, Denmark
Landscape Drifting		Hwang Da-eun, Park Hong-yeol	South Korea
Lula		Oliver Stone and Rob Wilson	United States, Brazil
Mother′s Household Ledger		Sung Seung-taek	South Korea
My Stolen Planet		Farahnaz Sharifi	Iran, Germany
No Other Land		Yuval Abraham, Basel Adra, Hamdan Ballal, Rachel Szor	Palestine, Norway
SAVE THE GAME		Park Yunjin	South Korea
So Long		Guillaume Brac	France
Soundtrack to a Coup d'Etat		Johan Grimonprez	Belgium, France, Netherlands
The Last of the Sea Women		Kim Sue	United States
The Other One		Marie-Magdalena Kochová	Czech Republic / Slovak Republic
The Remarkable Life of Ibelin		Benjamin Ree	Norway
The Sense of Violence		Kim Moo-young	South Korea
XiXi		WU Fan	Taiwan, Philippines, Korea

=== Midnight Passion ===
A collection of thrillers, horror and action films.

English title	Original title	Director(s)	Production country(ies)
Do Not Enter	No Entres	Hugo Cardozo	Paraguay
The Grotesque Train	괴기열차	Tak Se-woong	South Korea
Night Call		Michiel Blanchart	Belgium, France
The Damned	Les Damnés	Roberto Minervini	Belgium, Italy, United States
The Shameless		Konstantin Bojanov	India, Bulgaria, France, Switzerland, Taiwan
The Substance		Coralie Fargeat	United Kingdom, United States, France

=== On Screen ===
In this section 4 Korean 1 Taiwanese and 1 Japanese works will be released for the first time in the world.

English title	Original title	Director(s)	Production country(ies)	Platform / Network
Beyond Goodbye	さよならのつづき	Hiroshi Kurosaki	Japan	Netflix
Born for the Spotlight	影后	Yen Yi-wen	Taiwan	Netflix
Dongjae, the Good or the Bastard	좋거나 나쁜 동재	Park Gun-ho	South Korea	TVING
Gangnam B-Side	강남 비-사이드	Park Noo-ri	South Korea	Disney+
Hellbound Season 2	지옥 2	Yeon Sang-ho	South Korea	Netflix
Way Back Love	내가 죽기 일주일 전	Nam Geon	South Korea	TVING

== Special program in focus ==
=== In Memory of Lee Sun-kyun ===
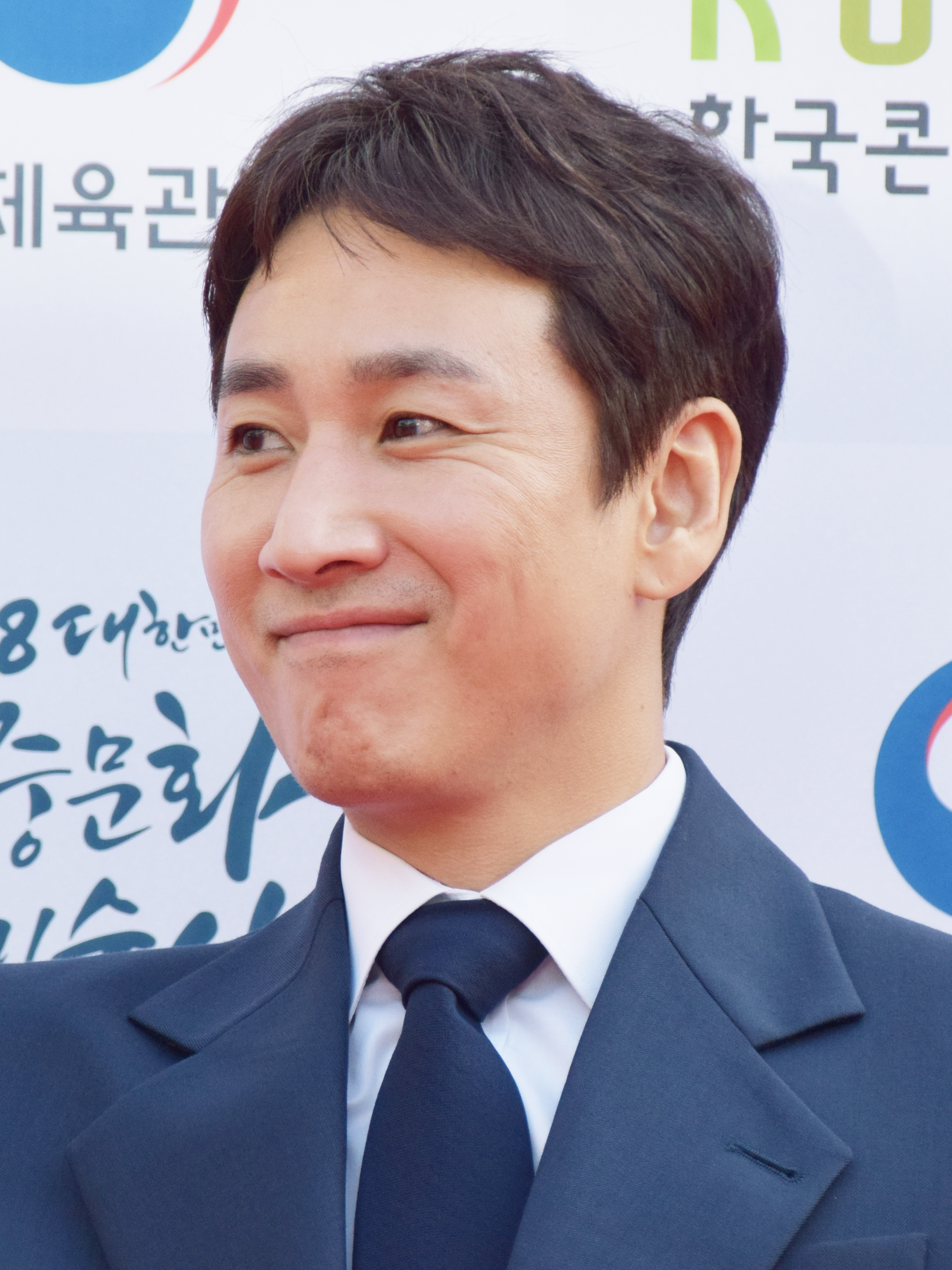
Lee in October 2018

The festival will hold 'In Memory of Lee Sun-kyun', a special feature program and screen six of the late actor's works and hold a special talk, while looking back on his acting life and achievements and creating a meaningful memorial.

Year	English title	Original title	Director(s)	Genre
2009	Paju	파주	Park Chan-ok	Drama
2013	Our Sunhi	우리 선희	Hong Sang-soo	Drama
2014	A Hard Day	끝까지 간다	Kim Seong-hun	Action thriller
2019	Parasite	기생충	Bong Joon-ho	Thriller
2024	Land of Happiness	행복의 나라	Choo Chang-min	Period drama
2018	My Mister	나의 아저씨	Kim Won-seok	5 of 16 episodes of Psychological drama

=== Miguel Gomes, a filmmaker of Joyful Melancholy ===
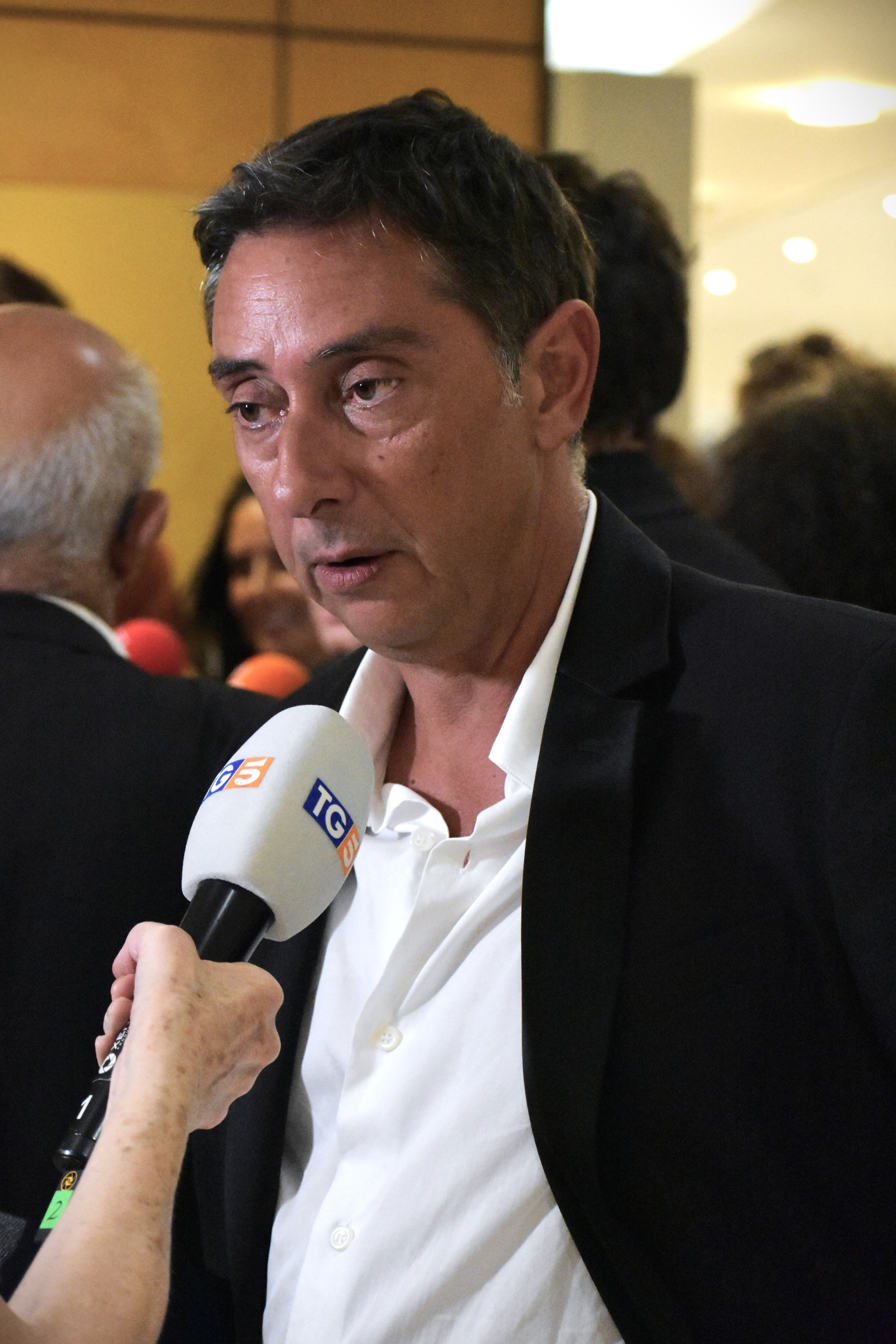
Miguel Gomes at Cannes 2024

Miguel Gomes has been invited to the festival, where his eight full-length films will be screened.

Year	English title	Original title	Genre
2004	The Face You Deserve	A Cara que Mereces	Comedy
2008	Our Beloved Month of August	Aquele Querido Mês de Agosto	Romance
2012	Tabu		Drama
2015	Arabian Nights Volume 1: The Restless One	As Mil e uma Noites	Drama
2015	Arabian Nights Volume 2: The Desolate One	As Mil e uma Noites	Drama
2015	Arabian Nights Volume 3: The Enchanted One	As Mil e uma Noites	Drama
2021	The Tsugua Diaries		Drama
2024	Grand Tour		Period drama

=== Teenage Minds, Teenage Movies ===
Year	English title	Original title	Director(s)	Production country
2023	City of Wind	Сэр сэр салхи	Lkhagvadulam Purev-Ochir	Mongolia
2024	Fish Bone	鱼刺	Xuyu Zhang	China
2024	Girls Will Be Girls		Shuchi Talati	India
2024	Happyend		Neo Sora	Japan
2024	I Am the Secret in Your Heart	夏日的檸檬草	Lai Meng Chieh	Taiwan
2024	My Sunshine	ぼくのお日さま	Hiroshi Okuyama	Japan
2024	Swimming in a Sand Pool	水深ゼロメートルから	Nobuhiro Yamashita	Japan
2023	Tiger Stripes		Amanda Nell Eu	Malaysia
2024	The Uniform	夜校女生	Chuang Ching-shen	Taiwan

=== Special Screening ===
English title	Original title	Director(s)
Walking in the Movies	영화 청년, 동호	Kim Lyang

== Awards and winners ==
Image	Recipient	Country	Ref.
The Asian Filmmaker of the Year
	Kiyoshi Kurosawa	Japan	
Korean Film Achievement Award
	Lee Sun-kyun	South Korea	

- New Currents Award:
  - The Land of Morning Calm
  - MA - Cry of Silence
- KIM Jiseok Award:
  - Village Rockstars 2, Rima Das, India
  - Yen and Ai-Lee by Tom Lin Shu-yu, Taiwan
- Sonje Award:
  - Yurim by Song Ji-seo, South Korea
  - A Garden In Winter by Eléonore Mahmoudian, Matsui Hiroshi, Japan, France
- BIFF Mecenat Award
  - Works And Days by Park Min-soo, Ahn Kearn-hyung, South Korea
  - Another Home by Frankie Sin, Taiwan, Hong Kong, France
- Actors of the Year:
  - Yoo Lee-ha, The Final Semester, Actor, South Korea
  - Park Seoyun, Humming, Actress, South Korea
- KB New Currents Audience Award:
  - The Land of Morning Calm by Park Ri-woong
- Flash Forward Audience Award:
  - Memories of a Burning Body, by Antonella Sudasassi Furniss, Costa Rica, Spain
- Documentary Audience Award: K-Number by Jo Se-young
- FIPRESCI Award: (Note: The FIPRESCI Award is given to the most exceptional film that reflects the creator’s experimental and progressive spirit, among those presented in the New Currents section.) Tale of the Land by Loeloe Hendra
- NETPAC Award: The Land of Morning Calm by Park Ri-woong
- The Choon-yun Award
  - Park Kwan-su, producer, South Korea
- Camellia Award: Ryu Seong-hie, South Korean film art director or production designer
- DGK PLUS M Award:
  - The Final Semester, by Lee Ran-hee
  - Red Nails, by Hwang Seulgi
- 'CGV Award: Fragment, by Kim Sung-yoon
- KBS Independent Film Award: The Final Semester, by Lee Ran-hee
- CGK Award: Waterdrop, cinematographer: Kang Jong-su
- Critic b Award: Inserts, by Lee Jong-su
- Chorokbaem Media Award:
  - Waterdrop, by Choi Jong-yong
  - Fragment, by Kim Sung-yoon
- Watcha Short Award: Lost Target, by Kim Dong-eun
- Songwon Citizen Critics’ Award: The Final Semester, by Lee Ran-hee
- Busan Cinephile Award: No Other Land, by Yuval Abraham, Basel Adra, Hamdan Ballal, Rachel Szor, Palestine, Norway
