= Chhaygaon =

Chhaygaon Chhaygaon, Champaknagar
- Town
- Location in Assam, India Chhaygaon (India)
- Coordinates: 26°02′52″N 91°23′13″E
- Country: India
- State: Assam
- Region: Western Assam
- District: Kamrup
- Elevation: 46 m (151 ft)

Languages
  - Official: Assamese,
  - Local: Kamrupi Assamese
- Time zone: UTC+5:30 (IST)
- PIN: 781124
- Vehicle registration: AS
- Website: kamrup.nic.in

Chhaygaon is a town in the Kamrup district of Assam, India; situated on the south bank of the Brahmaputra River. It is 38 km from the major town of Guwahati. Chhaygaon has a developing commercial and infrastructure profile, hosting branches of major banks such as State Bank of India (Gumi Branch), Canara Bank – SME Branch, Bank of Baroda (Dhekenabari Branch), Bandhan Bank, Indian Bank, and Slice Small Finance Bank along with multiple ATMs and financial service centres. A flyover on National Highway 17 improves connectivity along the Guwahati–Goalpara corridor, easing regional transportation. The town also includes a Flipkart Warehouse (FCMH, Chhaygaon), reflecting the expansion of e-commerce logistics and employment opportunities in the area. Educational institutions include Jatiya Vidyalaya Chhaygaon, a prominent local school, alongside other schools and Chhaygaon College. Additionally, Chhaygaon features several retail and fashion outlets including Fashion City and Reliance Trends.

== Etymology ==
The word Chhaygaon is derived from two Kamrupi Assamese words chhay (ছয়) (six) and gaon (গাঁও) (village) meaning six villages.

== Culture ==
The people from different religions are residing here, with distinct Kamrupi culture. The devotee throng here to pay their homage to the ancient temple of 'Chandika'. The Mer Ghar of Chand Sadagar, the merchant of the ancient times, evidences the story of Behula and Lakhinder, his daughter in law and son.

== History ==
The town was part of Kamapitha division of Ancient Kamrup. It was within capital region of ancient Kamrup kingdom. In pre-modern period it remained part of eastern Kamrup region. In nineteenth century, it became part of newly formed administrative undivided Kamrup district. In 2003, after bifurcation of old district, it is included in Kamrup rural district.

== Places of interest ==
=== Chand Sadagar's Mer Ghar ===
It is a site with which a mythological story is attached to a merchant named Chanda Sadagar and his son Lakhindar and his daughter-in-law Beula.

The legend says that Chanda Sadagar, who was a devotee of Lord Siva, once got a curse from 'Nag Devata' (the God of Snake) that he would have no descendants any further as his only son would be killed on the latter's wedding night. To prevent this, Lakhindar and his bride was confined in the "Mer Ghar" (a specially built sealed house for the newly wed couple to prevent entry of snakes ).

However, despite every effort, Lakhindar was bitten to death by 'Nag Devata' . It was Beula 's relentless offerings and prayers that saved her husband's life later on. Ruins of 'Merghar' and replica of Siva idols are still found around this site.

== Education ==
=== Chhaygaon College ===
The Chhaygaon College established in the year 1974 is the most important educational institution in the greater Chhaygaon. The college is located at an easily accessible site beside the National Highway number 37 at a distance of about 40 km west of Gauhati University and about 25 km from the Gauhati International Airport. It is a co-educational Institution providing instructions up to Three-Year Degree level in Arts and Commerce faculties and affiliated to Gauhati University.

Jatiya Vidyalaya Chhaygaon

The Jatiya Vidyalaya Chhaygaon, established on 1 January 2001, is one of the important vernacular-medium educational institutions in the greater Chhaygaon area of the Kamrup district of Assam. The school is located at Balashidhi, Chhaygaon, at an easily accessible site within the town, approximately 40 km west of Guwahati and about 25 km from the Lokpriya Gopinath Bordoloi International Airport. It is a co-educational institution providing instruction from the primary level up to High School Leaving Certificate (HSLC) level and is affiliated with the Board of Secondary Education, Assam. The school primarily imparts education through the Assamese medium and plays a significant role in promoting mother-tongue education in the region.

== Transport ==
Chhaygaon is at National Highway 17; is connected to nearby cities and towns with buses and other modes of transportation. It has a Railway station at Dhobargaon and LGB International Airport is situated at a distance of 25 km.

== See also ==
- Boko, Kamrup
- Bijay Karmakar
