= Bhauriabhita =

- village
- Location in Assam, India Bhauriabhita (India)
- Coordinates: 26.07°N 91.23°E
- Country: India
- State: Assam
- Region: Western Assam
- District: Kamrup

Government
  - Body: Gram panchayat

Languages
  - Official: Assamese
- Time zone: UTC+5:30 (IST)
- PIN: 781136
- Vehicle registration: AS
- Website: kamrup.nic.in

Bhauriabhita is a village in Kamrup rural district, in the state of Assam, India, situated in south bank of river Brahmaputra.

== Transport ==
The village is located north of National Highway 31 and connected to nearby towns and cities like Boko, Chaygaon and Guwahati with regular buses and other modes of transportation.

== See also ==
- Bhogpur
- Barpalaha
