= Bondapara =

- village
- Location in Assam, India Bondapara (India)
- Coordinates: 25.98°N 91.08°E
- Country: India
- State: Assam
- Region: Western Assam
- District: Kamrup

Government
  - Body: Gram panchayat

Languages
  - Official: Assamese
- Time zone: UTC+5:30 (IST)
- PIN: 781135
- Vehicle registration: AS
- Website: kamrup.nic.in

Bondapara is a village in Kamrup rural district, in the state of Assam, India, situated in south bank of river Brahmaputra.

== Transport ==
The village is located north of National Highway 31 and connected to nearby towns and cities like Chaygaon, Boko and Guwahati with regular buses and other modes of transportation.

== See also ==
- Birpara
- Bongra
