= Bihdia =

- village
- Location in Assam, India Bihdia (India)
- Coordinates: 26.08°N 91.37°E
- Country: India
- State: Assam
- Region: Western Assam
- District: Kamrup

Government
  - Body: Gram panchayat

Languages
  - Official: Assamese
- Time zone: UTC+5:30 (IST)
- [[]]: 781381
- Vehicle registration: AS
- Website: kamrup.nic.in

Bihdia is a village in Kamrup rural district, in the state of Assam, India, situated in south bank of river Brahmaputra.

== Transport ==
The village is located north of National Highway 31 and connected to nearby towns and cities like Chaygaon, Boko and Guwahati with regular buses and other modes of transportation. This place has a regular transport system and one can travel here easily.

== See also ==
- Birpara
- Bhomolahati
