= Birpara, Kamrup =

Birpara
- village
- Location in Assam, India Birpara (India)
- Coordinates: 26.02°N 91.29°E
- Country: India
- State: Assam
- Region: Western Assam
- District: Kamrup

Government
  - Body: Gram panchayat

Languages
  - Official: Assamese
- Time zone: UTC+5:30 (IST)
- PIN: 781123
- Vehicle registration: AS
- Website: kamrup.nic.in

Birpara is a village in Kamrup rural district, in the state of Assam, India, situated in south bank of river Brahmaputra.

== Transport ==
The village is located north of National Highway 31 and connected to nearby towns and cities like Bamunigaon, Chaygaon, Boko and Guwahati with regular buses and other modes of transportation. Bamunigaon railway station is located here.

== See also ==
- Bihdia
- Bhomolahati
