= Ita Fort =

Fort in Arunachal Pradesh, India

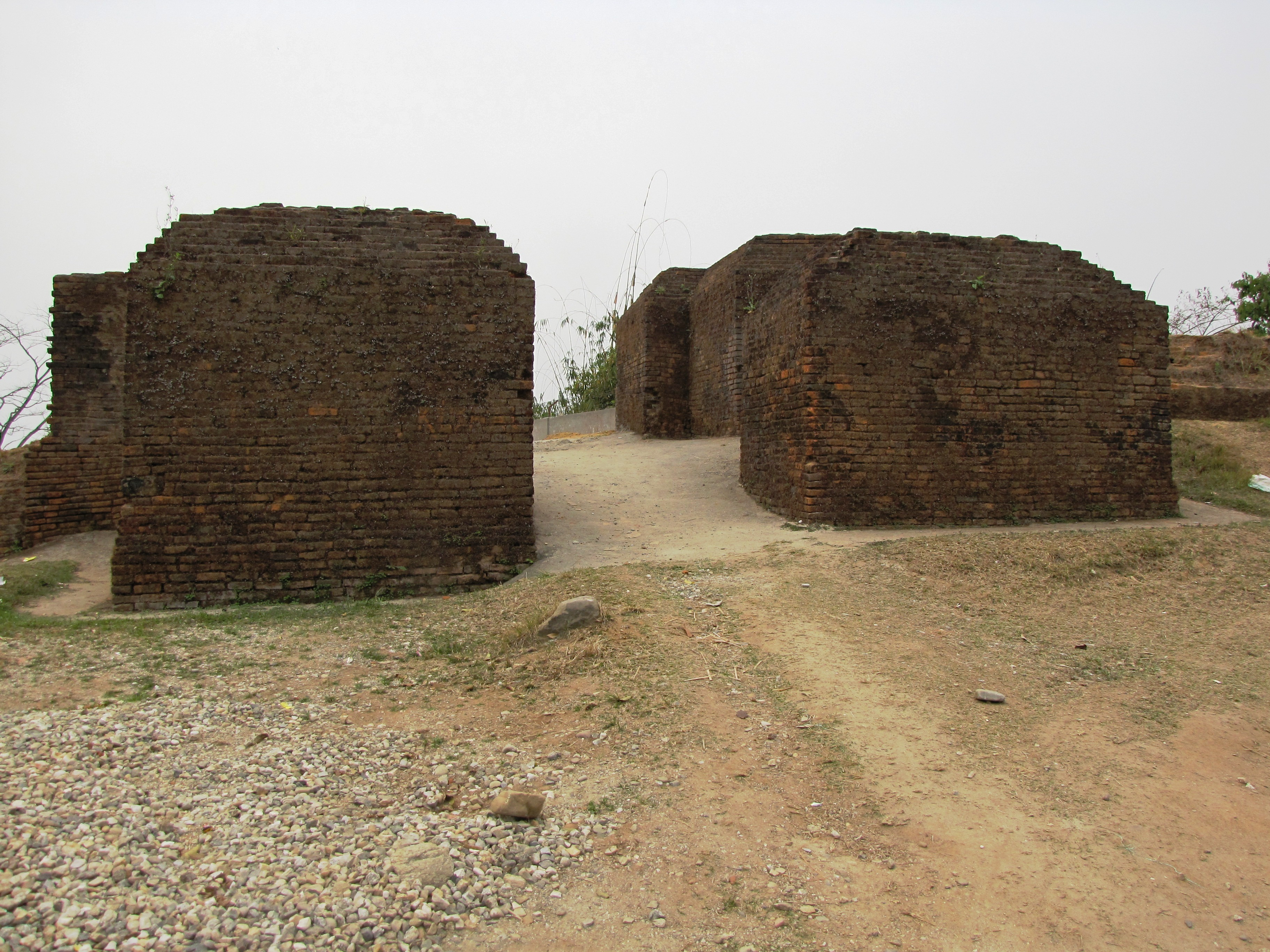
- Ita Fort, southern gate
- Interactive map of Ita Fort
- 27.092°N 93.632°E
- Type: Fort
- Location: Itanagar, Arunachal Pradesh, India
- Part of: Arunachal Pradesh

History
- Built: 11th–14th century
- Built by: Sutiya kingdom

Site notes
- Material: Bricks, Granite and Lime mortar
- Condition: Ruins
- Management: Government of Arunachal Pradesh

Ita Fort in Itanagar town is an important historical site in the state of Arunachal Pradesh, India. The name literally means "Fort of Bricks" (brick being called "Ita" in the Assamese language). It also lends its name to the city Itanagar, the capital of Arunachal Pradesh. The Ita Fort at Arunachal Pradesh is generally assumed to be built by the Sutiya kings in the 14th or the 15th century. The fort has an irregular shape, built mainly with bricks dating back to the 14th - 15th century. The total brickwork is of 16,200 cubic metre lengths which was probably built by kings of the Sutiya kingdom which ruled the region during that time. The architectural style of the walls of the fort, with a stone masonry base and layers of bricks on top of it, is similar to the enclosure walls of Tamreswari Temple and Rukmini Nagar. Archaeological finds from the site are on displayed at the Jawaharlal Nehru Museum, Itanagar.

== History ==
The bricks used in the fort hint to its construction in the 14th-15th century. The ruins of a hill fort on the banks of the Buroi river bear the same builder's marks as the ones found in the ruins of the Tamreswari Temple near Sadiya, which might indicate that the Sutiya fortifications were spread till Biswanath. The location of Ita fort well to the east of Buroi shows that the Ita fort was also one of the Sutiya hill forts.

=== Historical Claims and Interpretations ===
In the year 1941, the political officer of former Balipara frontier tract, Mr. D.N. Das, in an article published in the Journal of Assam Research Society, claimed the fort to be the capital of Ramachandra/Mayamatta Mayapur. But, from the assamese chronicle Adi Charita (which is itself dubious), it is known that Ramachandra had his capital in Pratappura, due to which, he was known as Pratappuriya. Pratappura has been identified to be located near Biswanath. The Pratapgarh ruins may have formed the eastern borders of the kingdom as evident from the Uma-tumani island (near Biswanath) stone inscription which mentions the ruler as Pratapuradhikari. Further, it is also known that Ramachandra/Pratapuriya's son Arimatta or Sansanka had his kingdom in present day Kamrup, Darrang and Sonitpur districts with capital at Baidargarh (Betna) and annexed the Kamata kingdom by killing the Kamateswar Phengua. These might point that the Ita fort had nothing to do with Arimatta line of kings.

== Gallery ==
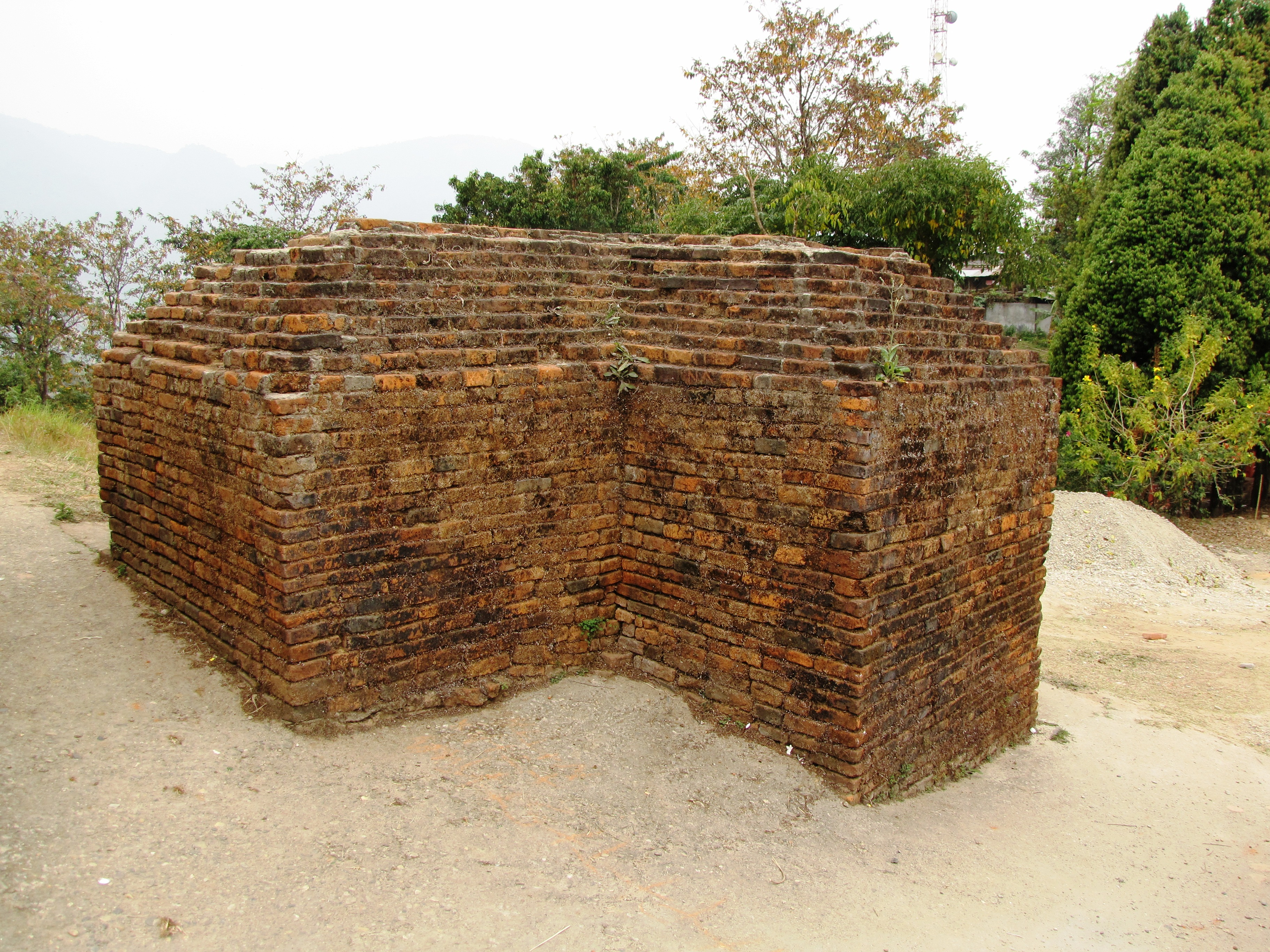
A brick wall at the southern gate.

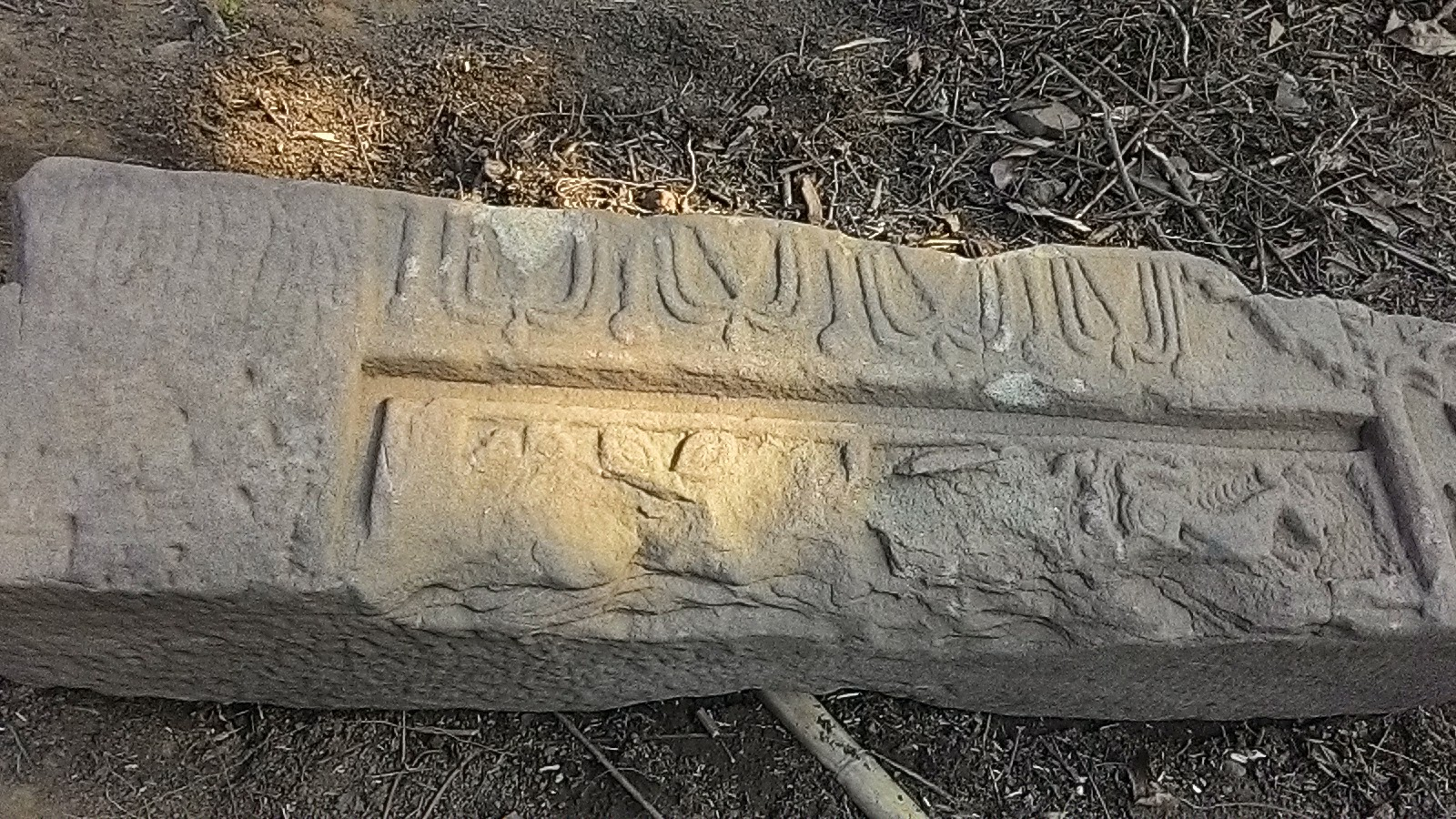
A granite stone carvings found in Ita fort depicting a lion, the symbol of the Chutia kingdom.

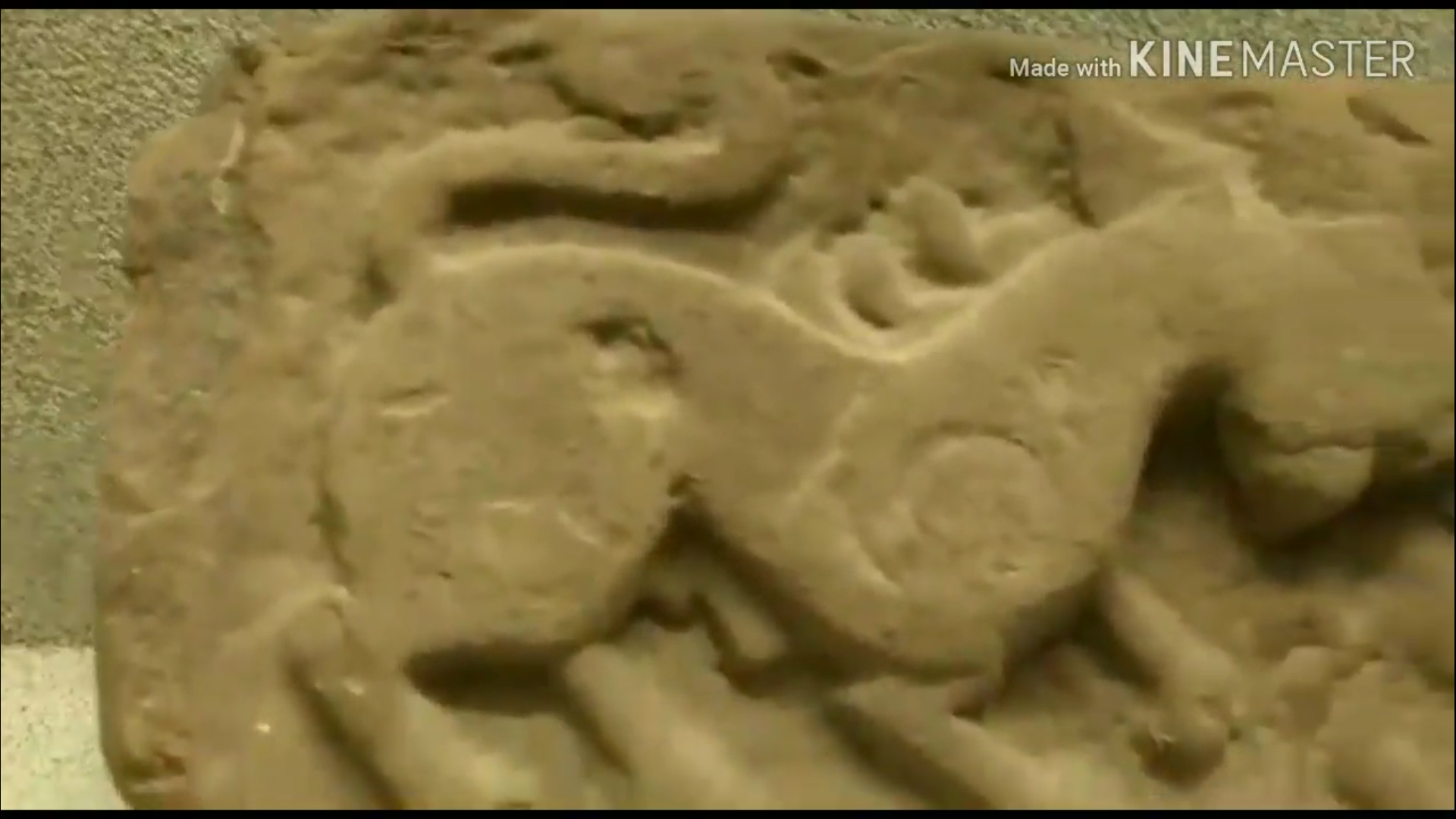
Lion artwork from Ita fort. Lion was the emblem of the Chutia kingdom as found in Rukmini Nagar and Bhismaknagar.
