= Dorakahara =

- village
- Location in Assam, India Dorakahara (India)
- Coordinates: 26.29°N 91.70°E
- Country: India
- State: Assam
- Region: Western Assam
- District: Kamrup

Government
  - Body: Gram panchayat

Languages
  - Official: Assamese
- Time zone: UTC+5:30 (IST)
- PIN: 781101
- Vehicle registration: AS
- Website: kamrup.nic.in

Dorakahara is a village in the Kamrup rural district, in the state of Assam, India, situated on the north bank of the Brahmaputra River.

== Transport ==
The village is located near National Highway 27 and is connected to nearby towns and cities like Changsari and Guwahati with regular buses and other modes of transportation.

== See also ==
- Dihina
- Bongra
