= Nandita Das (politician) =

Indian politician

President of Assam Pradesh Mahila Congress Committee
- In office 3 January 2019 – 2022
- Succeeded by: Mira Borthakur

Member of the Legislative Assembly, Assam
- In office 2016–present
- Preceded by: Gopinath Das
- Constituency: Boko, Assam

Personal details
- Born: 23 October 1969 (age 55); Guwahati, Assam
- Political party: Indian National Congress
- Spouse: Bhabesh Chandra Das
- Education: B.A. (Hons)
- As of July, 2021

Nandita Das (born 23 October 1969) is an Indian National Congress politician from the state of Assam, India. She is a two time member of Assam Legislative Assembly. She won the 2016 and 2021 assembly election from Boko constituency.

Nandita Das was appointed president of Assam Pradesh Mahila Congress Committee on 3 January 2019 and served in that capacity until 2022.
