= Batarhat =

- village
- Location in Assam, India Batarhat (India)
- Coordinates: 26.09°N 91.49°E
- Country: India
- State: Assam
- Region: Western Assam
- District: Kamrup

Government
  - Body: Gram panchayat

Languages
  - Official: Assamese
- Time zone: UTC+5:30 (IST)
- PIN: 781122
- Vehicle registration: AS
- Website: kamrup.nic.in

Batarhat is a village in Kamrup Rural District, in the state of Assam, India. It is situated on the south bank of river Brahmaputra.

== Transport ==
The village is near National Highway 31 and connected to nearby towns and cities like Chaygaon, Bijoynagar and Guwahati with regular buses and other modes of transportation.

== See also ==
- Baruajani
- Barpalaha
