= Raju Mesh =

Indian politician (born 1979)

Assam Legislative Assembly
- Incumbent
- Assumed office May 2026
- Constituency: Boko–Chaygaon Assembly constituency

Personal details
- Born: 1979 (age 46–47)
- Party: Bharatiya Janata Party

Raju Mesh (born 1979) is an Indian politician from Assam. He is a member of the Assam Legislative Assembly from the Boko–Chaygaon Assembly constituency, which is reserved for Scheduled Tribe community, in Kamrup district representing the Bharatiya Janata Party.

Mesh is from Boko, Kamrup district, Assam. He is the son of the late Lalit Mesh. He completed his Bachelor of Arts at Jawaharlal Nehru College, Boko which is affiliated with Gauhati University in 2004. He runs his own business. He declared assets worth Rs. 29 crore in his affidavit to the Election Commission of India.

== Career ==
Mesh won the Boko–Chaygaon Assembly constituency representing the Bharatiya Janata Party in the 2026 Assam Legislative Assembly election. He polled 1,07,113 votes and defeated his nearest rival, Ramen Singh Rabha of the Indian National Congress, by a margin of 59,554 votes.
