= Don Bosco College, Itanagar =

College in Arunachal Pradesh, India

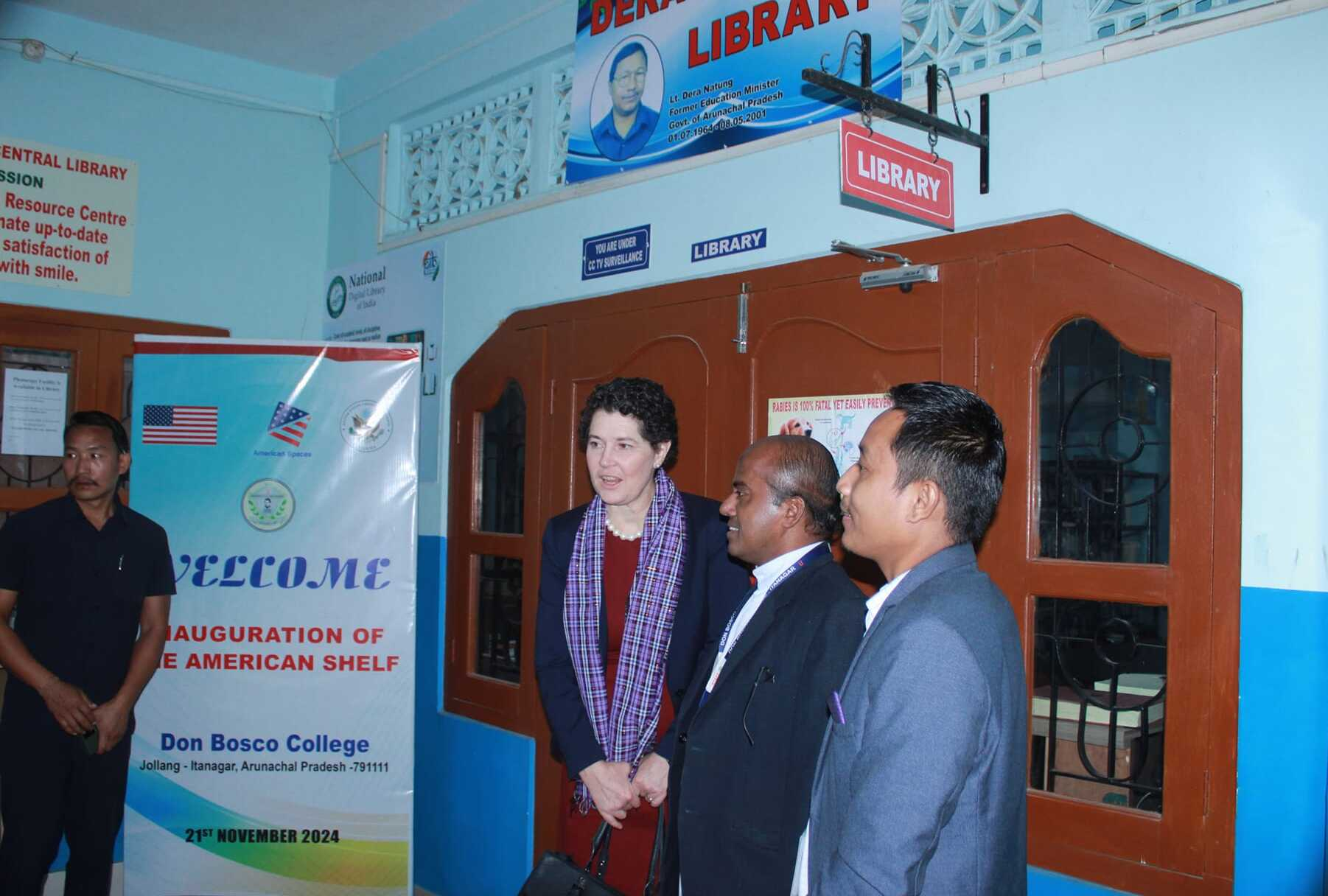
- Visit to Don Bosco by Kathy Diaz, the Consulate General of the United States, Kolkata in 2024
- Motto: Lead Kindly Light
- Type: Undergraduate college
- Established: 2002
- Academic affiliations: Rajiv Gandhi University
- Principal: Fr. Jose George
- Location: Jollang, Itanagar, Arunachal Pradesh, India; 27.084°N 93.605°E
- Campus: Urban
- Website: https://dbcitanagar.ac.in

Don Bosco College, Itanagar is an undergraduate degree college at Jollang in Itanagar, Arunachal Pradesh, India. Established in 2002, it is a Catholic institution managed by the Salesians of Don Bosco Educational Society. It is affiliated to Rajiv Gandhi University and has been described as the first private college established in Arunachal Pradesh.

== Accreditation ==
Don Bosco College is accredited by the National Assessment and Accreditation Council (NAAC) with a Grade A in the first cycle, achieving a Cumulative Grade Point Average (CGPA) of 3.13, making it one of the first private colleges in Arunachal Pradesh to receive this distinction. The achievement was marked with a celebration at the college on 5 April 2023.

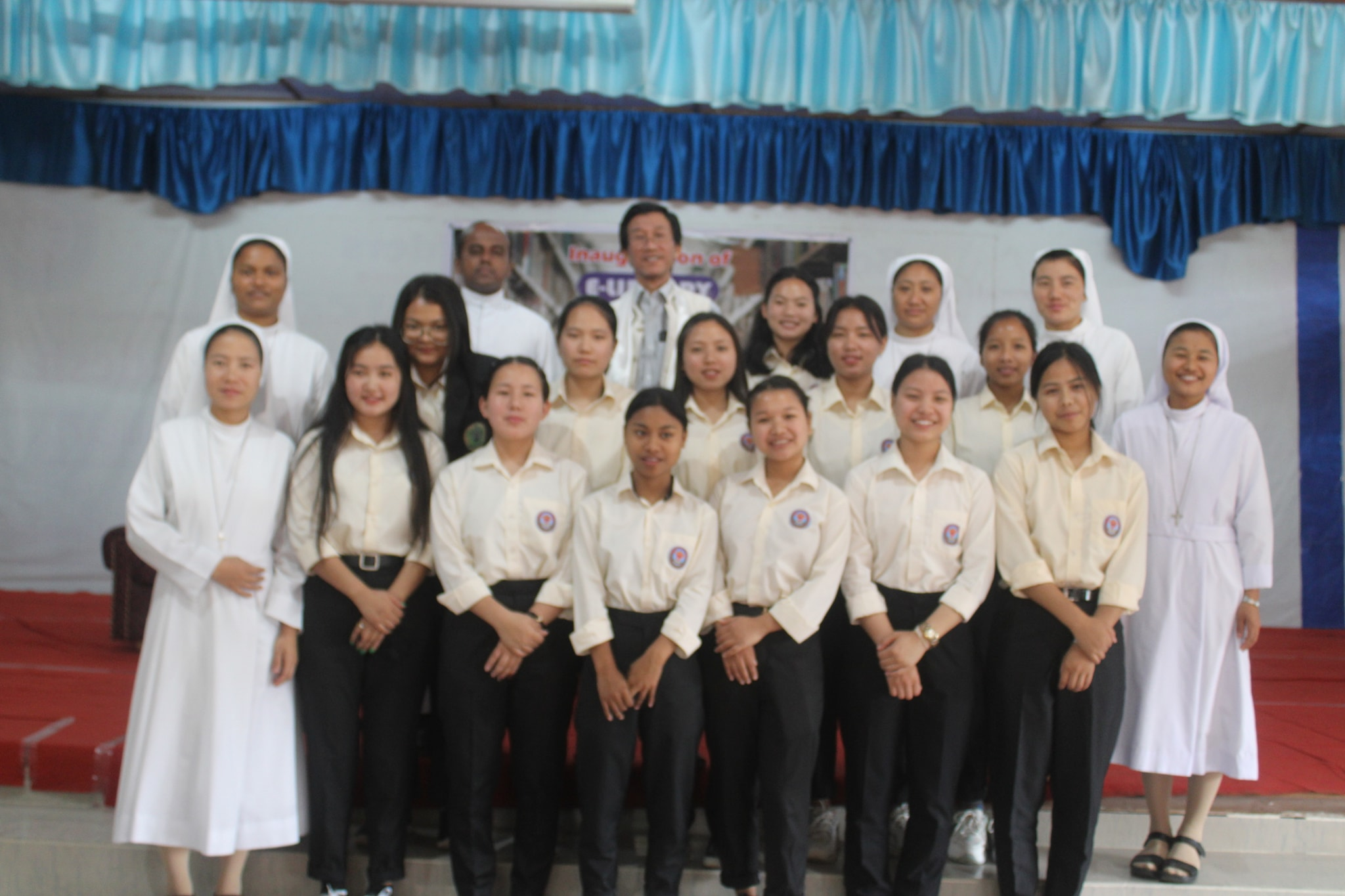
Dera Natung E-library inauguration

== Campus and facilities ==
In March 2021, Chief Minister Pema Khandu inaugurated a sports stadium on campus named in memory of his father and former Chief Minister Dorjee Khandu, built at a cost of approximately ₹1.80 crore. The stadium was made available to the state government and other organizations for state and national level events. In July 2021, Itanagar Municipal Corporation Mayor Tame Phassang laid the foundation stone for a boys' hostel on campus.

The college library, known as the Dera Natung Library, received an "American Shelf" of 118 books on American history and culture donated by the US Consulate General in Kolkata, inaugurated by US Consul General Kathy Giles-Diaz.

== Overview ==
DBC hosts academic and extracurricular activities across its departments. Its Department of Economics has organized national seminars supported by the Indian Council of Social Science Research, and the college has participated in environmental initiatives including events co-organized with the Arunachal Sociological Forum. The college won the Best Institution award at the Arunachal Youth Parliament 2.0 in 2025.

== Departments ==
- Department of Political Science
- Department of Social Work (BSW)
- Department of Commerce
- Department of English
- Department of History
- Department of Sociology
- Department of Economics
