= Bhogpur, Kamrup =

Bhogpur
- village
- Location in Assam, India Bhogpur (India)
- Coordinates: 26.07°N 92.00°E26.074299,92.0041353
- Country: India
- State: Assam
- Region: Western Assam
- District: Kamrup

Government
  - Body: Gram panchayat

Languages
  - Official: Assamese
- Time zone: UTC+5:30 (IST)
- PIN: 781366
- Vehicle registration: AS
- Website: kamrup.nic.in

Bhogpur is a village in Kamrup rural district, in the outskirts of Guwahati, in the state of Assam, India, situated in south bank of river Brahmaputra. It is surrounded by localities of Sonapur, Jorabat, and Jagiroad.

== Transport ==
The village is located south of National Highway 31 and connected to Guwahati with regular buses and other modes of transportation.

== Attractions ==
The village is known for 'Tegheriya picnic spot'.

== See also ==
- Bhauriabhita
- Barpalaha
