= Jawaharlal Nehru Museum, Itanagar =

State museum at Itanagar, Arunachal Pradesh, India

Jawaharlal Nehru State Museum
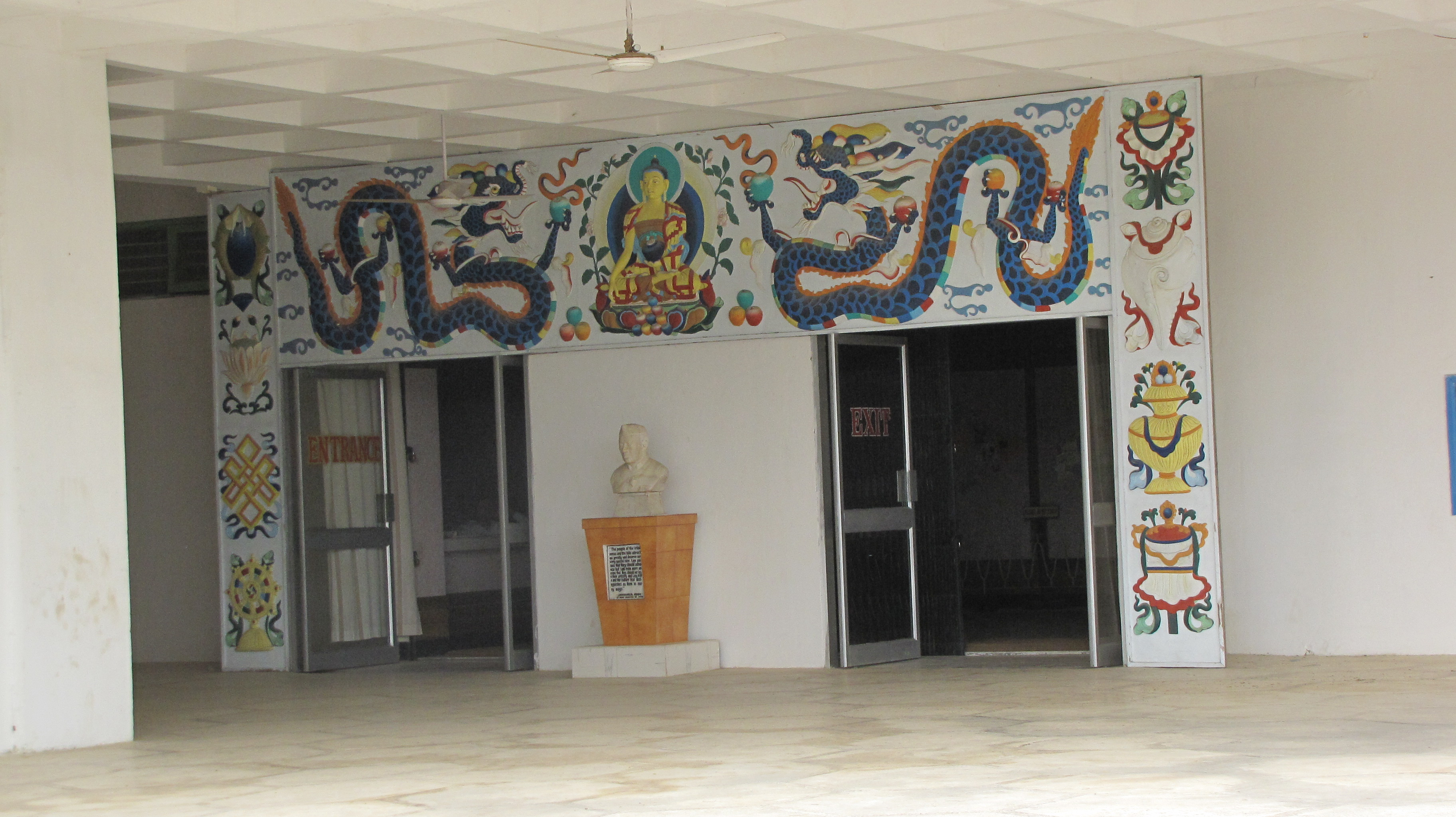
- Entrance of Jawaharlal Nehru Museum
- Location: State Museum Road, Itanagar 791111
- Coordinates: 27.102036°N 93.625003°E
- Type: ethnographic and archeological
- Owner: Government of Arunachal Pradesh

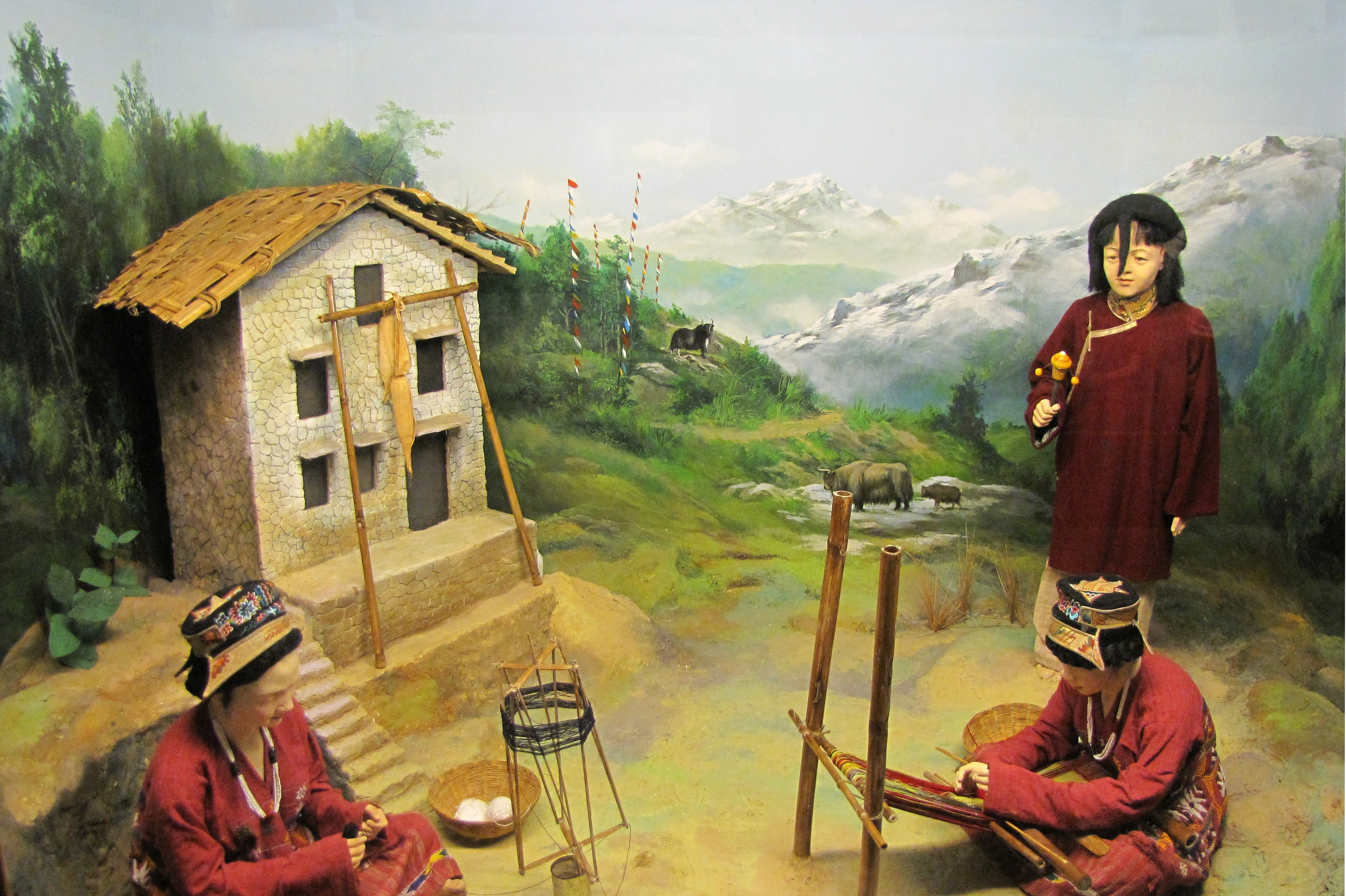
Diorama and wax figures of the Monpa people at the Jawaharlal Nehru Museum

The Jawaharlal Nehru State Museum (or simply Jawaharlal Nehru Museum) is a state museum in Itanagar, Arunachal Pradesh, India. Established in the 1980s, it showcases aspects of tribal life of the Himalayan state of Arunachal Pradesh, India. These include clothing, headdress, weapons, handicraft, music instruments, jewellery and other artifacts of daily use and culture, besides archeological finds.

Over the years, the museum has become an important tourist destination in the state capital.

== Collection and activities ==
The ground floor of the museum houses an extensive ethnographic collection, including traditional art, musical instruments, religious objects, and handicrafts, like wood carving and cane products, while the first floor has archaeological objects found in Ita Fort, Noksparbat and Malinithan in West Siang district.

Apart from its collection, the museum runs a workshop for traditional cane products at its Handicrafts Centre. The museum shop sells tribal handicrafts.

In 2011, Tapi Mra, the first person from the state to scale Mount Everest, donated his entire expedition gear to the museum.
