= Itanagar =

- State capital city
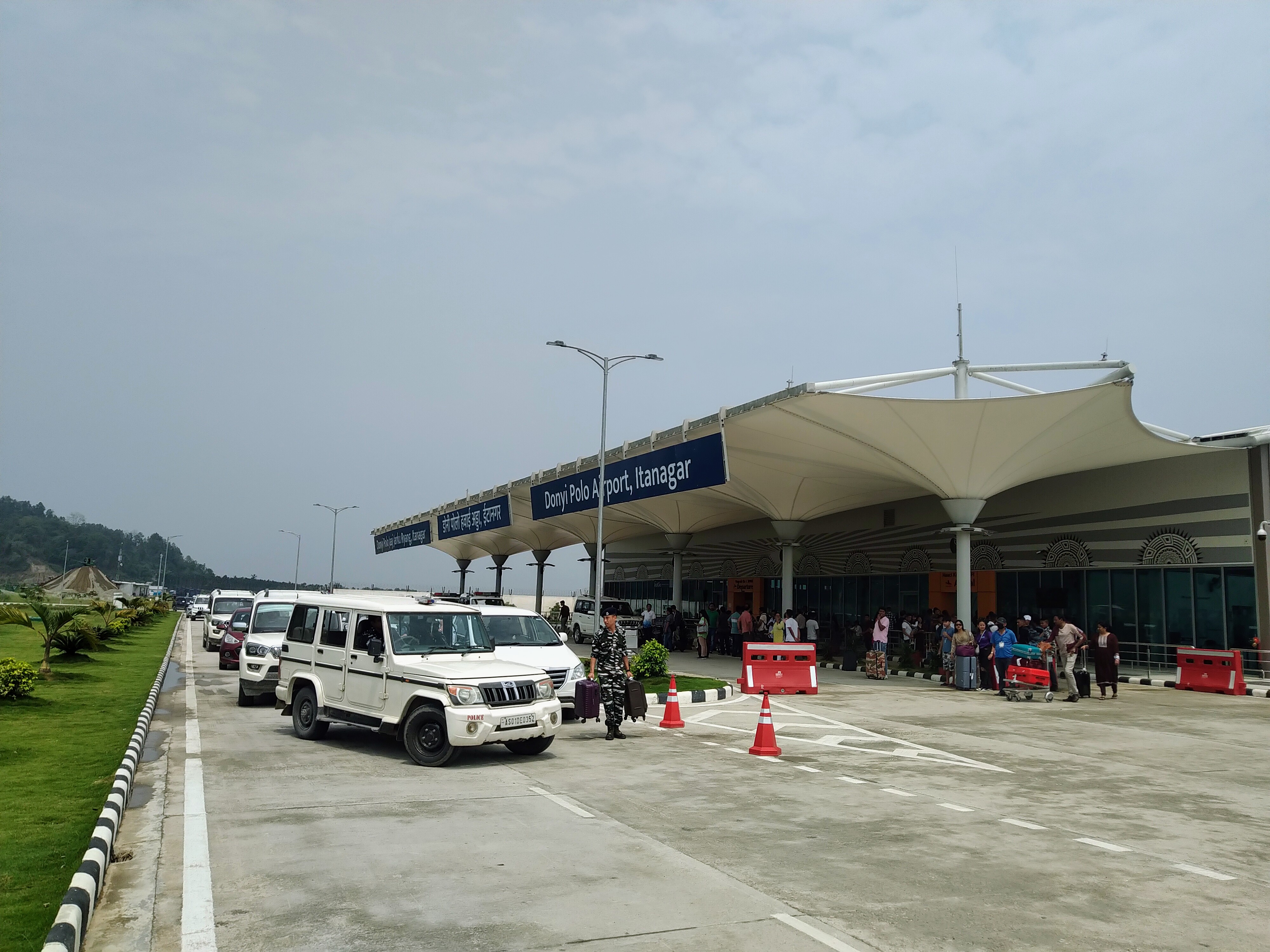
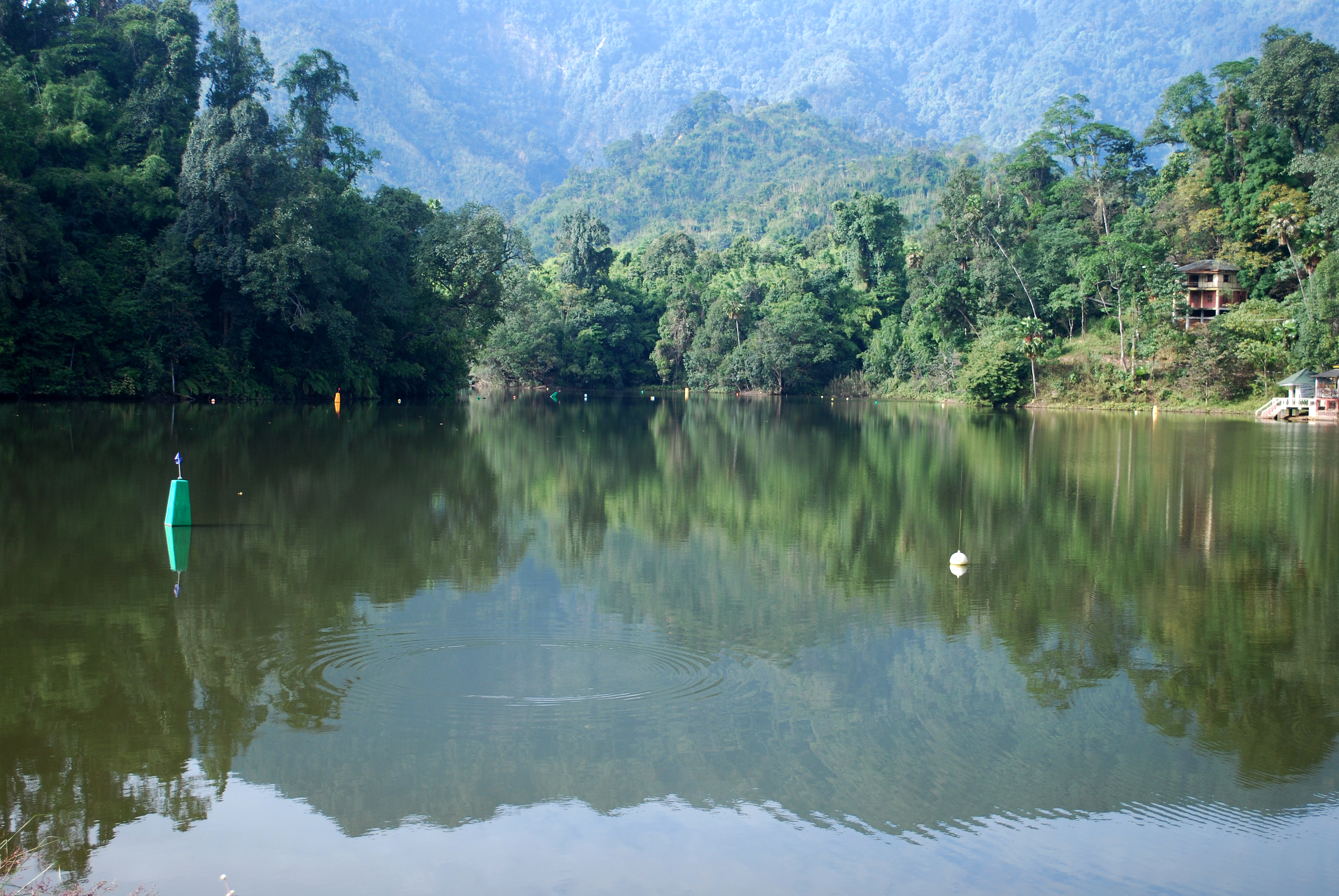
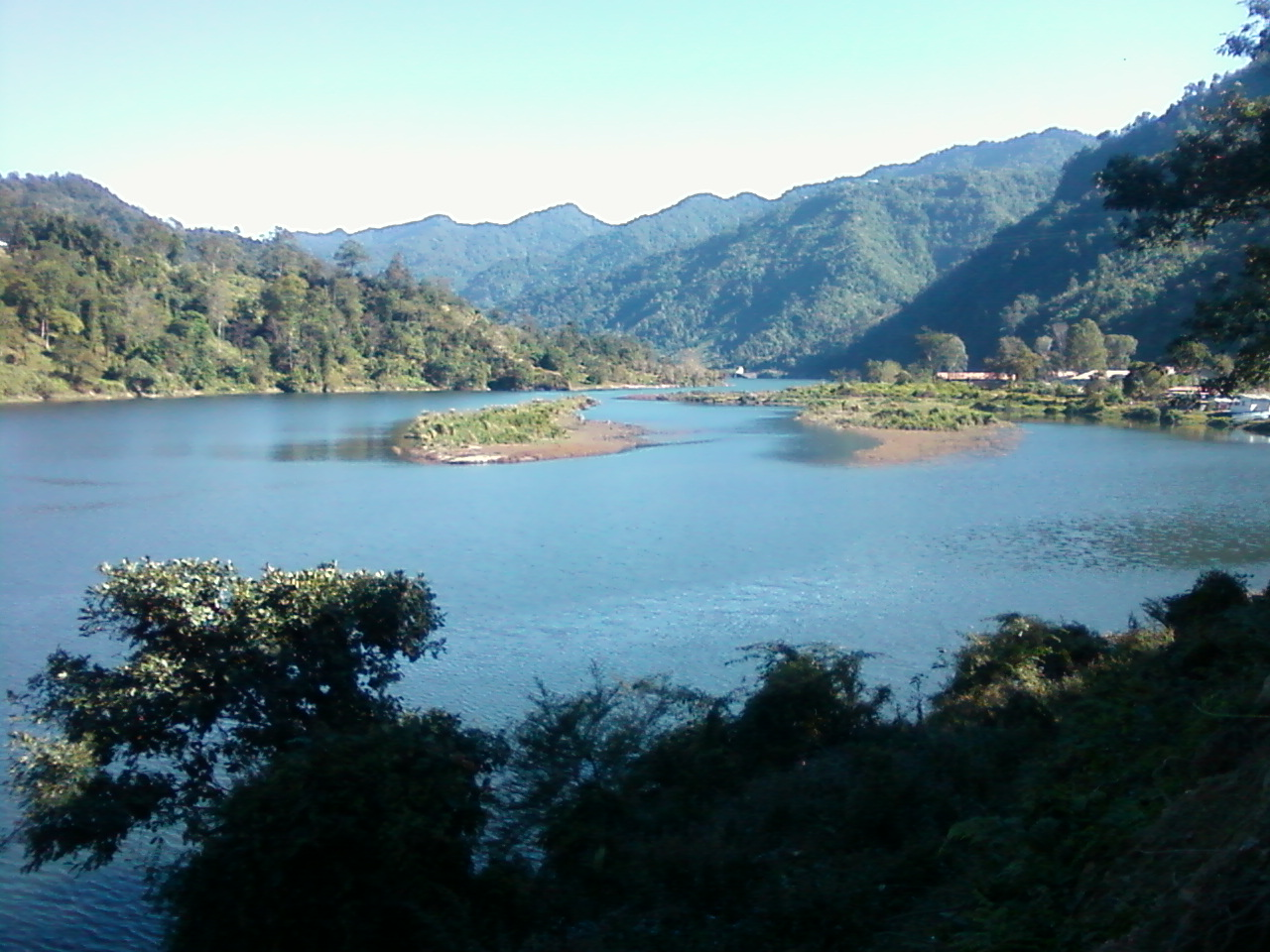
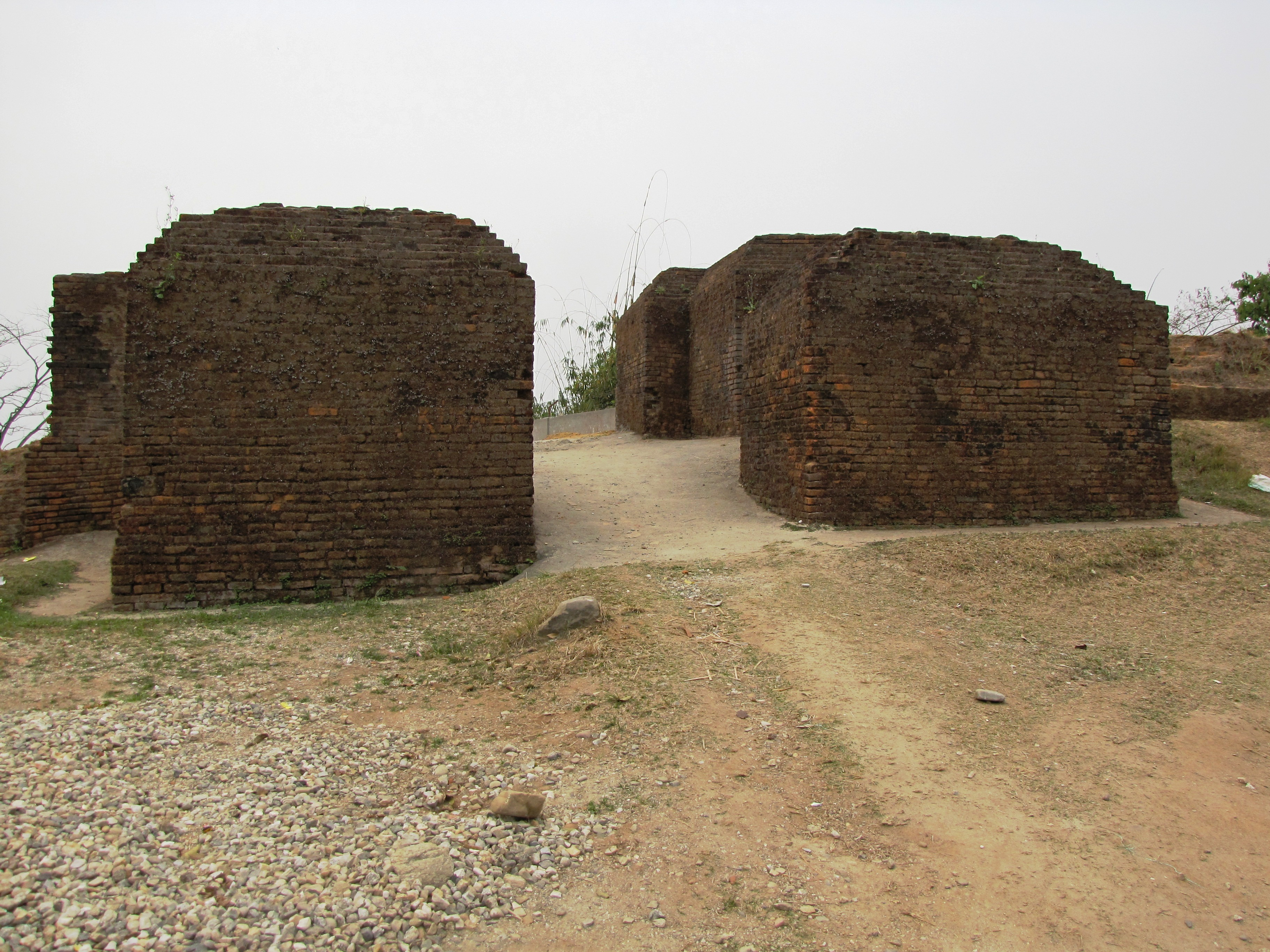
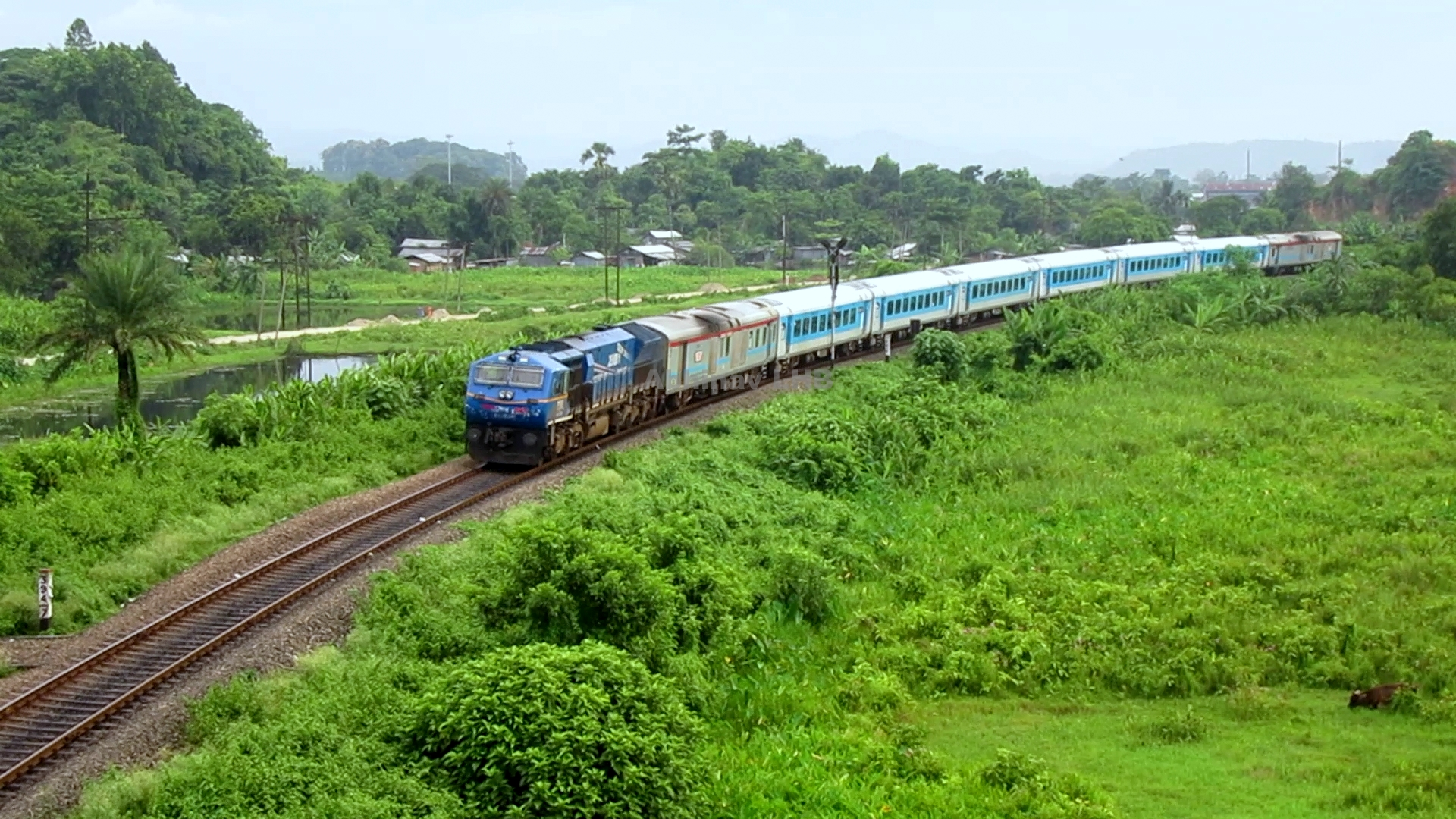
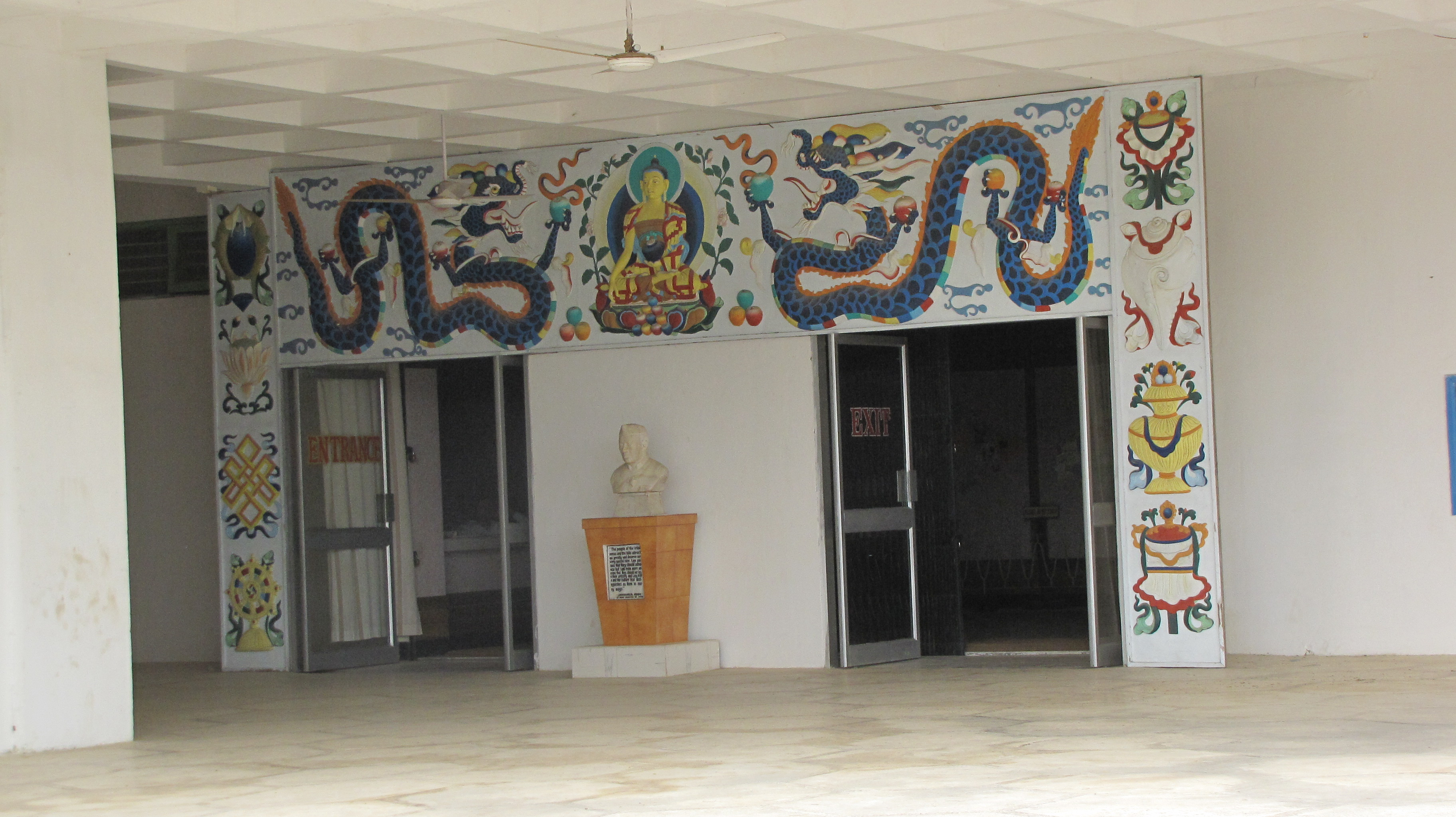
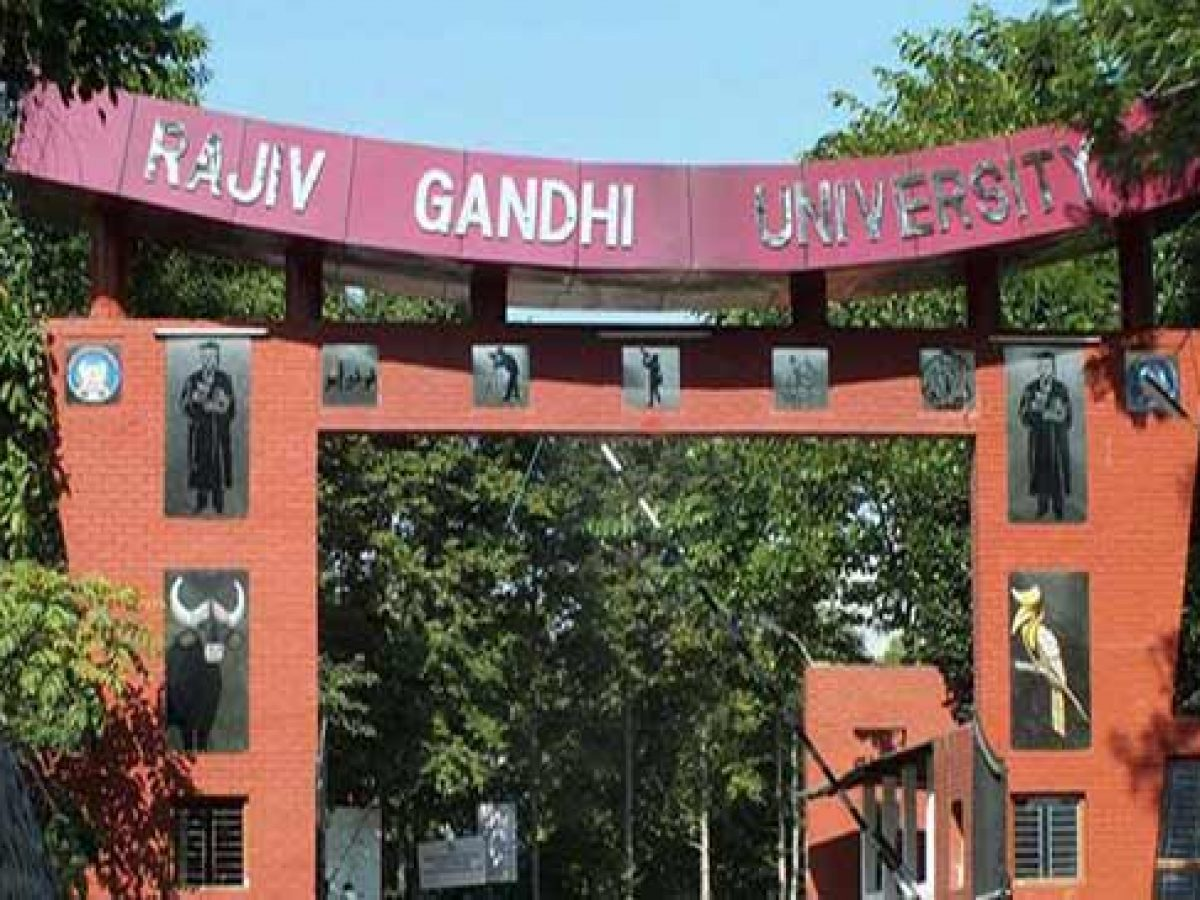
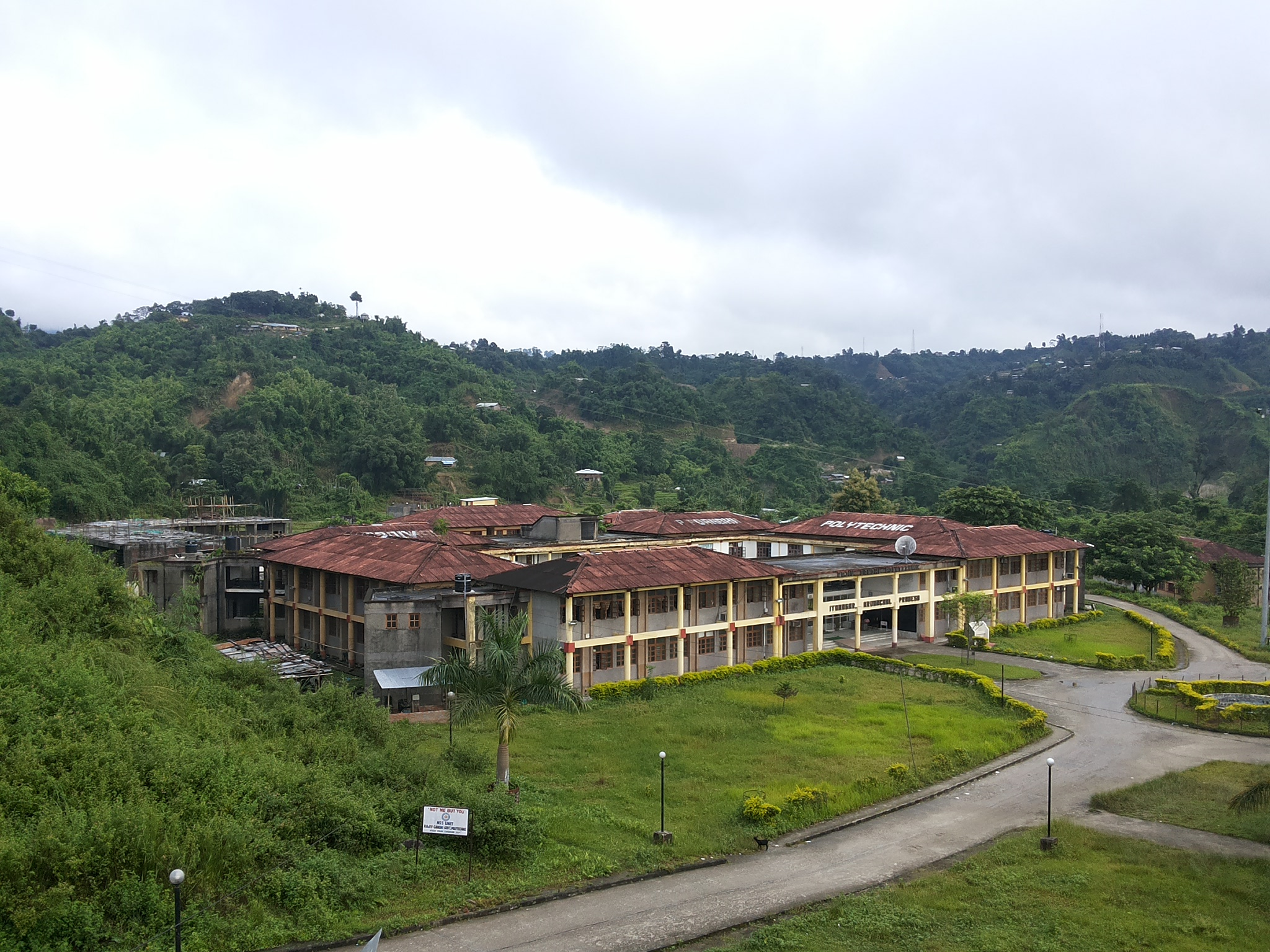
- From top, left to right: Donyi Polo Airport, Ganga/Gyakar Sinyi lake, Lake at Itanagar, Ita Fort southern gate, Shatabdi Express from Itanagar station to Guwahati, Jawaharlal Nehru Museum, Itanagar, Rajiv Gandhi University
- Nickname: Capital of Arunachal
- Location of Itanagar in Arunachal Pradesh Itanagar (India)
- Coordinates: 27°06′00″N 93°37′12″E
- Country: India
- State: Arunachal Pradesh
- District: Itanagar

Government
  - Type: Municipal Corporation
  - Body: Itanagar Municipal Corporation
  - Mayor: Likha Nari Tadar (BJP)
  - Deputy Mayor: Tok Tabin Camdir (BJP)
  - Lok Sabha MP: Kiren Rijiju (BJP)
  - MLA: Techi Kaso (BJP)

Area
  - Total: 51.69 km^{2} (19.96 sq mi)
- Elevation: 320 m (1,050 ft)

Population (2011)
  - Total: 59,490
  - Density: 1,151/km^{2} (2,981/sq mi)
- Demonym: Itanagari

Languages
  - Official: English
- Time zone: UTC+5:30 (IST)
- PINs: 791111, 791112, 791113
- Vehicle registration: AR-01, AR-02
- Website: imc.arunachal.gov.in

Itanagar (/iːˈtɑːnəɡər/) is the capital and largest town of the Indian state of Arunachal Pradesh. The seat of Arunachal Pradesh Legislative Assembly, the seat of government of Arunachal Pradesh, and the seat of Gauhati High Court permanent bench at Naharlagun are all in Itanagar. Being the hub of all the major economic bases, Itanagar, along with the adjacent town of Naharlagun, comprises the administrative region of the Itanagar Capital Complex Region. This stretches from the Itanagar Municipal limit at Chandranagar Town, until Nirjuli Town, and is a major hub of cultural, economic, fashion, education and recreational activities.

== Etymology ==
Itanagar derives its name from Ita Fort, the 'fort of bricks' situated in the heart of Itanagar. The fort has an irregular shape, built mainly with bricks dating back to the 14th-15th century.

== History ==
The earliest recorded history of present-day Itanagar is associated with Ita Fort, a medieval brick fortification situated within the city. The name Itanagar is derived from the fort, with ita meaning "brick". Archaeological and architectural evidence places the construction of the fort between the 14th and 15th centuries CE. The fort has been variously attributed to the Chutia (Sutiya) kings, who ruled the region during that period. The fort is enclosed by natural ridges and brick ramparts, forming an irregular fortified complex that represents one of the most important medieval archaeological sites in Arunachal Pradesh. Excavations at the site have yielded brickbats, pottery and iron clamps, with the pottery being dated to the medieval period. The remains of Ita Fort are protected as a State Protected Monument by the Government of Arunachal Pradesh.

Present-day Itanagar was established as the capital of the then North-East Frontier Agency (NEFA) in the 1970s. The foundation stone of the new capital was laid by President V. V. Giri on 20 April 1974. Nabam Runghi, the first Agency Council member of NEFA, played a central role in the selection of the present site for the capital. He persuaded the then Governor of Assam, B. K. Nehru, to establish the capital at Itanagar by demonstrating the historical significance of Ita Fort, and is widely credited as the architect of Itanagar and the person behind making the city the capital of Arunachal Pradesh.

== Geography ==
Itanagar is located at 27.1°N 93.62°E. It has an average elevation of 320 metres.

== Climate ==
Itanagar features a humid subtropical climate (Köppen: Cwa), with dry, mild winters and hot, humid and wet summers.

Climate data for Itanagar
Month	Jan	Feb	Mar	Apr	May	Jun	Jul	Aug	Sep	Oct	Nov	Dec	Year
Record high °C (°F)	27.2 (81.0)	30.0 (86.0)	33.9 (93.0)	33.7 (92.7)	40.5 (104.9)	35.8 (96.4)	38.0 (100.4)	36.6 (97.9)	35.2 (95.4)	35.6 (96.1)	31.3 (88.3)	28.9 (84.0)	40.5 (104.9)
Mean daily maximum °C (°F)	23.4 (74.1)	25.0 (77.0)	27.8 (82.0)	29.0 (84.2)	31.0 (87.8)	31.4 (88.5)	31.9 (89.4)	31.6 (88.9)	31.5 (88.7)	30.3 (86.5)	28.1 (82.6)	25.2 (77.4)	28.8 (83.8)
Daily mean °C (°F)	17.1 (62.8)	18.1 (64.6)	21.0 (69.8)	23.4 (74.1)	25.9 (78.6)	27.1 (80.8)	27.6 (81.7)	27.6 (81.7)	27.2 (81.0)	25.3 (77.5)	21.0 (69.8)	18.0 (64.4)	23.3 (73.9)
Mean daily minimum °C (°F)	10.8 (51.4)	11.2 (52.2)	14.2 (57.6)	17.8 (64.0)	20.8 (69.4)	22.8 (73.0)	23.3 (73.9)	23.6 (74.5)	22.9 (73.2)	20.2 (68.4)	13.8 (56.8)	10.7 (51.3)	17.7 (63.9)
Record low °C (°F)	6.6 (43.9)	5.2 (41.4)	8.8 (47.8)	13.6 (56.5)	18.7 (65.7)	20.0 (68.0)	20.5 (68.9)	21.3 (70.3)	17.4 (63.3)	15.6 (60.1)	9.8 (49.6)	7.4 (45.3)	5.2 (41.4)
Average rainfall mm (inches)	33.7 (1.33)	67.6 (2.66)	106.1 (4.18)	226.8 (8.93)	468.7 (18.45)	633.2 (24.93)	577.7 (22.74)	503.0 (19.80)	492.3 (19.38)	241.6 (9.51)	19.2 (0.76)	11.3 (0.44)	3,381.2 (133.12)
Average rainy days (≥ 2.5 mm)	2.5	5.3	6.9	12.2	14.4	19.7	20.5	16.4	16.2	8.5	1.8	1.0	125.4
Average relative humidity (%) (at 17:30 IST)	85	77	71	75	78	84	83	86	89	87	85	86	82
Source: India Meteorological Department

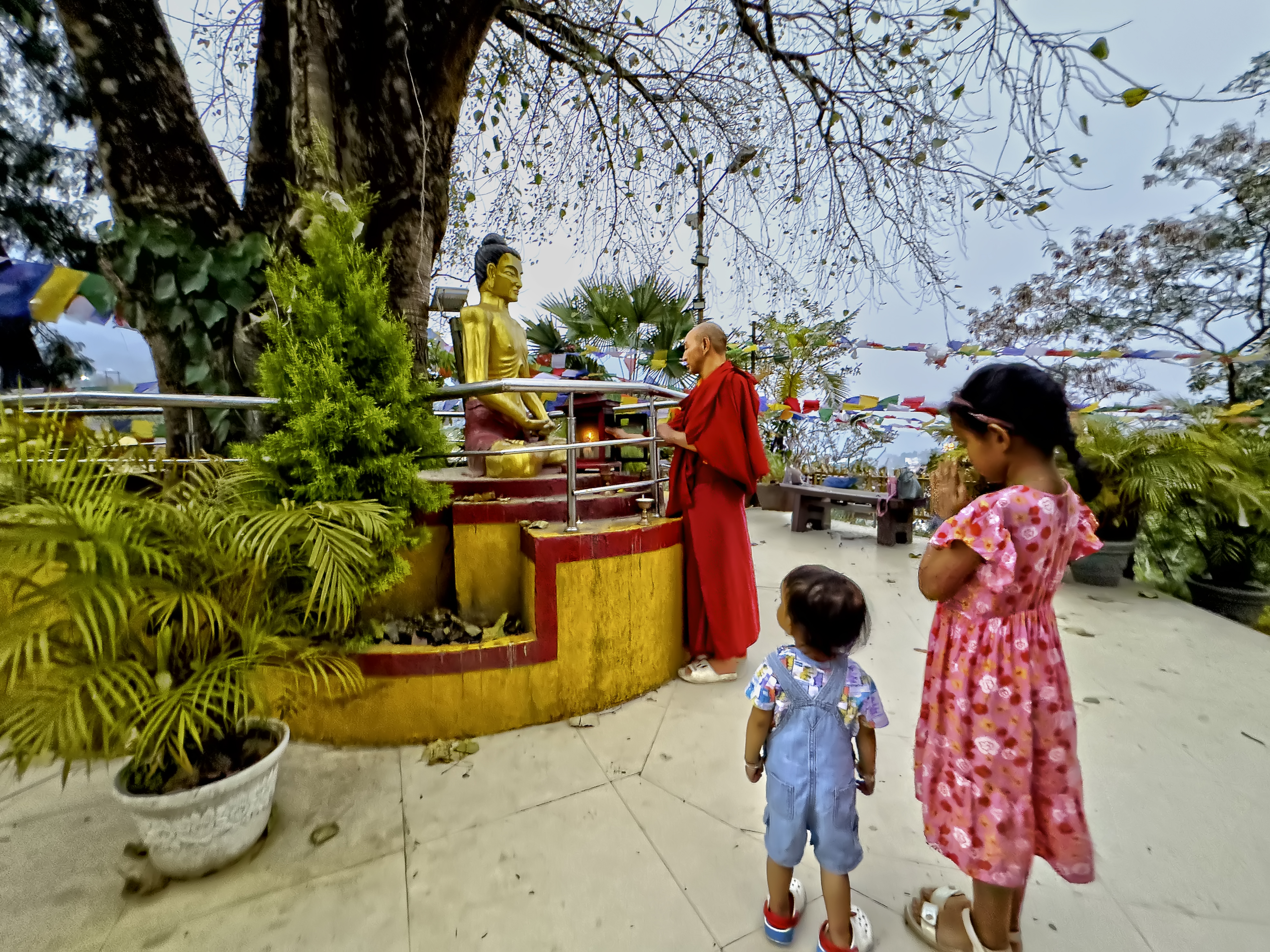
Centre for Buddhist Culture (Gompa Temple), Itanagar, Arunachal Pradesh.

== Local Governance ==
The Itanagar Council was constituted on 14 August 2013 with 30 wards. In 2020, it was upgraded to the Itanagar Municipal Corporation under the provisions of the Arunachal Pradesh Municipal Corporation Act, 2019, and reorganized into 20 wards.

The administrative functions of the Itanagar Municipal Corporation are headed by the Commissioner, Shri Kego Jilen. The corporation also has a Joint Commissioner, Shri Khoda Lasa, along with other administrative officers, including an Administrative Officer, Statistical Officer, Executive Engineers, Municipal Veterinary Officer, Finance and Accounts Officer, and Assistant Engineers. The elected leadership of the Itanagar Municipal Corporation comprises the Mayor, Smti Likha Nari Tadar, representing Ward No. 16, and the Deputy Mayor, Shri Tok Tabin Camdir, representing Ward No. 17.

In April 2026, the Itanagar Municipal Corporation assumed responsibility for the functions of Urban Planning, including Town Planning, and Regulation of land use and construction of buildings, following a Government notification transferring these subjects to the corporation with effect from 8 April 2026.

== Culture ==
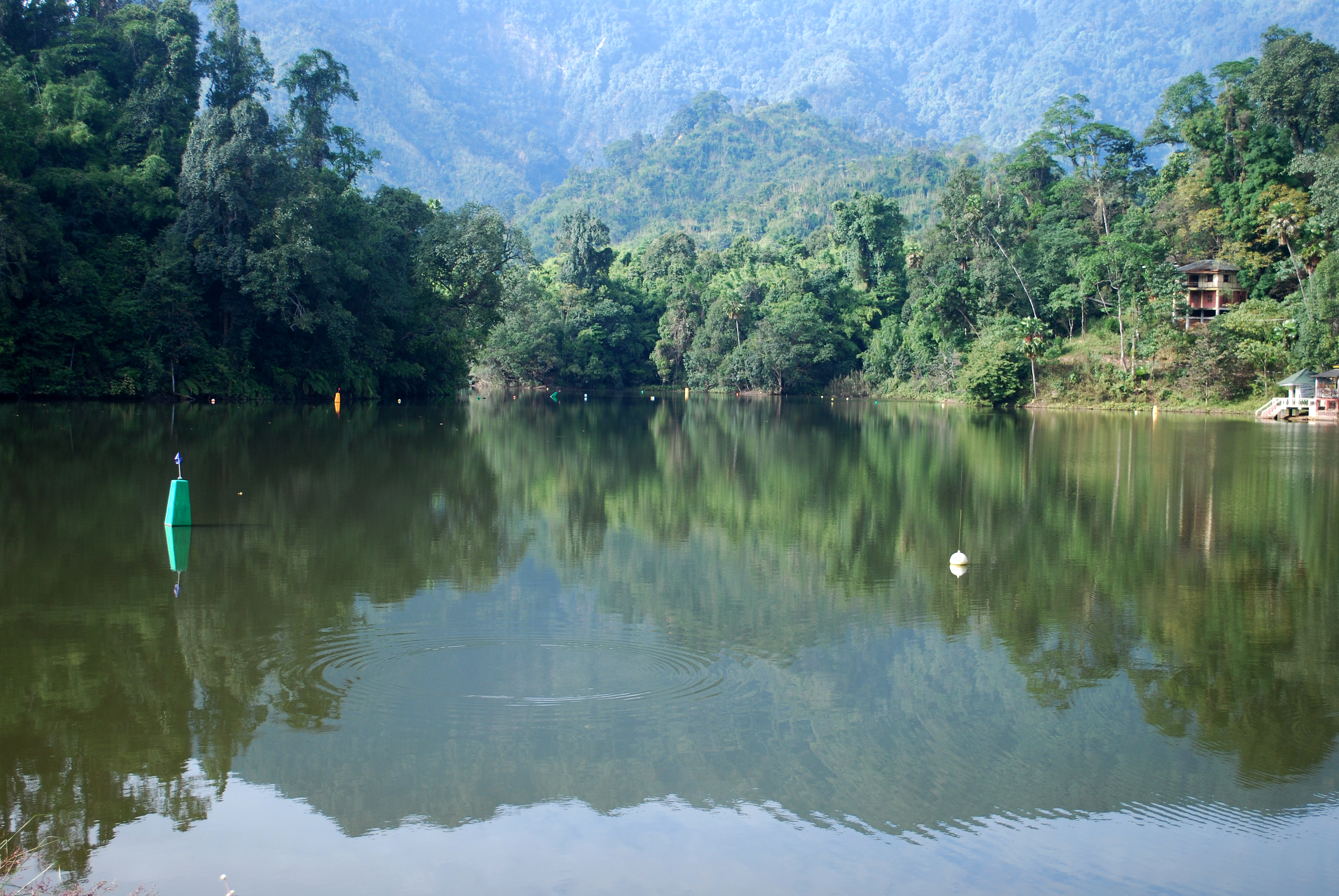
Ganga Lake

Itanagar has a number of tribes, i.e., Nyishi, Adi, Apatani, Tagin, Galo, etc.

== Economy ==
The economy of Itanagar is predominantly agrarian, with a large section of the population depending on agriculture. Besides agriculture, handloom, handicrafts, weaving, and tourism contribute to the region's economy. The climate and topography support the cultivation of wheat, rice, millet, pulses, potatoes, and sugarcane, while jhum cultivation and terrace farming are widely practised. The favourable agro-climatic conditions also support horticulture, with fruits such as pineapple, apple, orange, plum, pear, walnut, chestnut, and guava, along with spices, bamboo, aromatic and medicinal plants, cardamom, ginger, and mushrooms. Handloom is one of the major small-scale industries and is the primary occupation of many women, producing items such as Galuk (shirts), Gale (skirts), side bags, cotton shawls, and curtain cloth. The handicraft industry, based mainly on bamboo and cane, also includes weaving, carpet making, ornament making, wood carving, carpentry, and pottery, producing items such as ladies' hats, haversacks, wooden statues, wooden fruit bowls, wooden ashtrays, traditional bangles, and Tankha paintings.

== Demographics ==
As of 2011 India census, Itanagar had a population of 59,490. Males constituted 53% of the population and females 47%. Itanagar has an average literacy rate of 66.95%, lower than the national average of 74.4%: male literacy is 73.69%, and female literacy is 59.57%. In Itanagar, 15% of the population is under 6 years of age.

=== Religion ===
Religion in Itanagar City (2011)
Religion	Percent
Hinduism	40.94%
Christianity	29.51%
Donyi Polo	21.17%
Islam	4.52%
Buddhism	2.88%
Others*	0.98%
*Others include Sikhism, Jainism & Other religions

A majority of the tribes are worshipers of nature, with Tani Tribes being descendants of the Forefather Abotani, being followers of Donyi-Polo. According to the 2011 census, 40.94% of the population is Hindu, 29.51% Christian, 21.17% Donyi Polo, 4.52% Muslim and 2.88% Buddhist.

=== Languages ===
Languages of Itanagar (2011)
1. Nishi (30.1%)
2. Bengali (13.7%)
3. Adi (13.6%)
4. Apatani (7.15%)
5. Nepali (6.26%)
6. Hindi (6.12%)
7. Assamese (5.93%)
8. Bhojpuri (3.34%)
9. Other (13.8%)

According to 2011 census, Nishi was the most spoken language in Itanagar with 17,896 speakers, followed by Bengali at 8,125, Adi at 8,102, Apatani at 4,256, Nepali at 3,721, Hindi at 3,641, Assamese at 3,538 and Bhojpuri at 1,987.

== Education ==
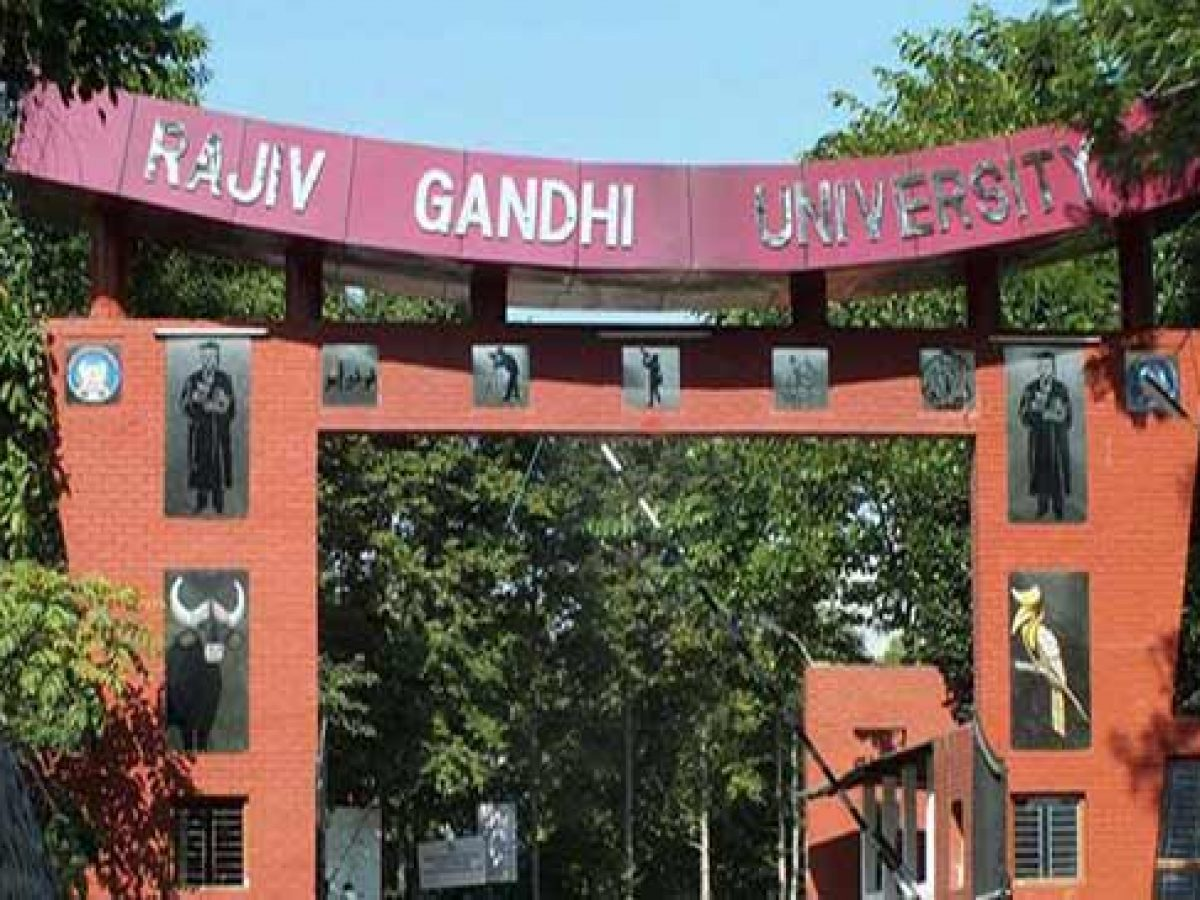
Rajiv Gandhi University

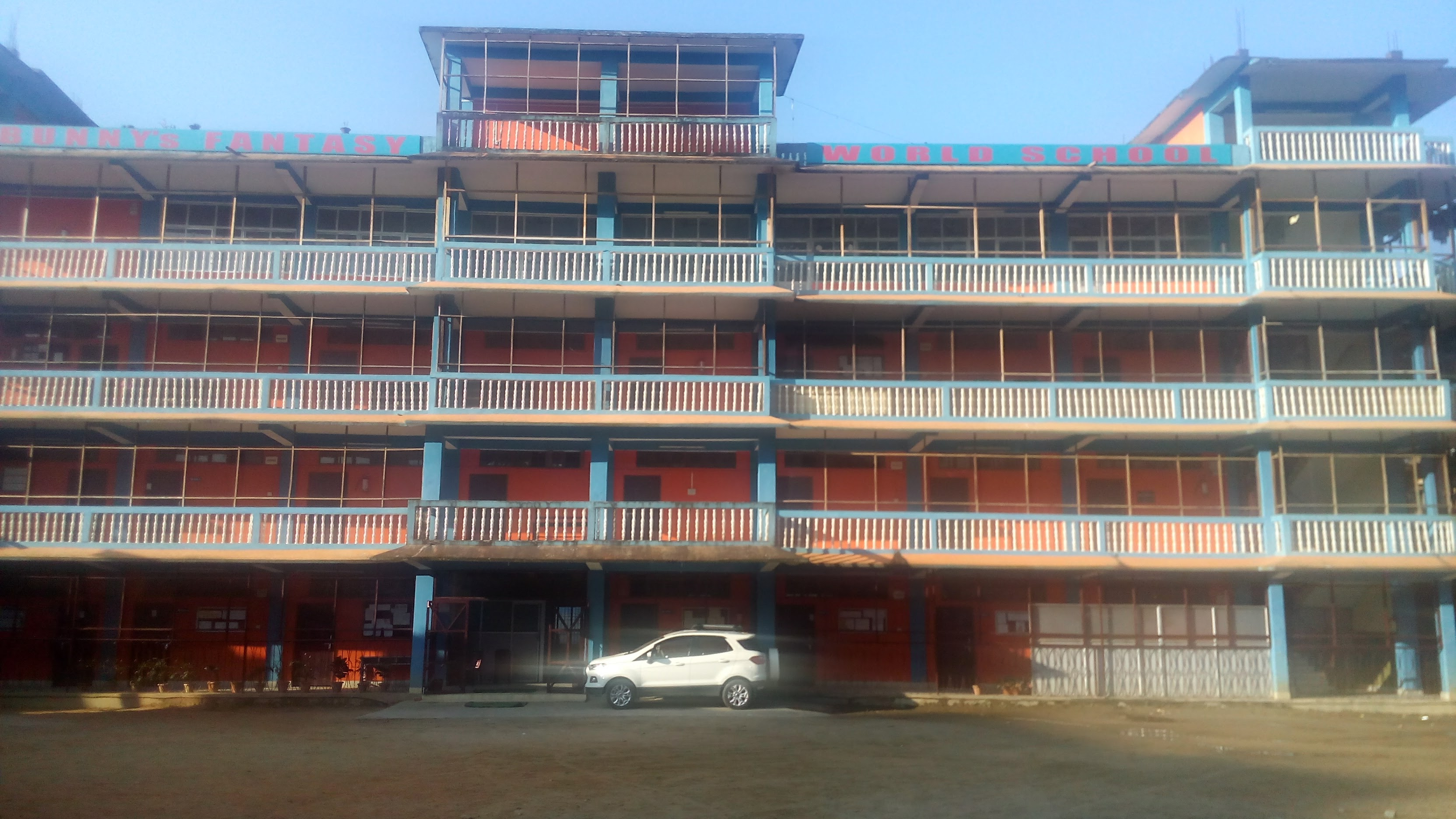
Front view of Bunny's fantatsy world school and boys hostel, Itanagar

=== Universities and colleges ===
- Dera Natung Government College
- Don Bosco College
- Himalayan University
- NERIST
- National Institute of Technology, Arunachal Pradesh
- Rajiv Gandhi Government Polytechnic
- Rajiv Gandhi University
- Tomo Riba Institute of Health and Medical Sciences
- Indira Gandhi National Open University

== Media and communications ==
=== Television ===
DD Arunprabha is the state-owned television broadcaster of Arunachal Pradesh.

=== Radio ===
Radio stations of Itanagar are: All India Radio, RadioCity Itanagar (Arunachal Pradesh's first community radio) and Big FM 92.7 (India's largest national radio network).

=== Newspapers ===
- The Arunachal Times
- Echo of Arunachal
- Dawnlit Post

== Places of Interest ==
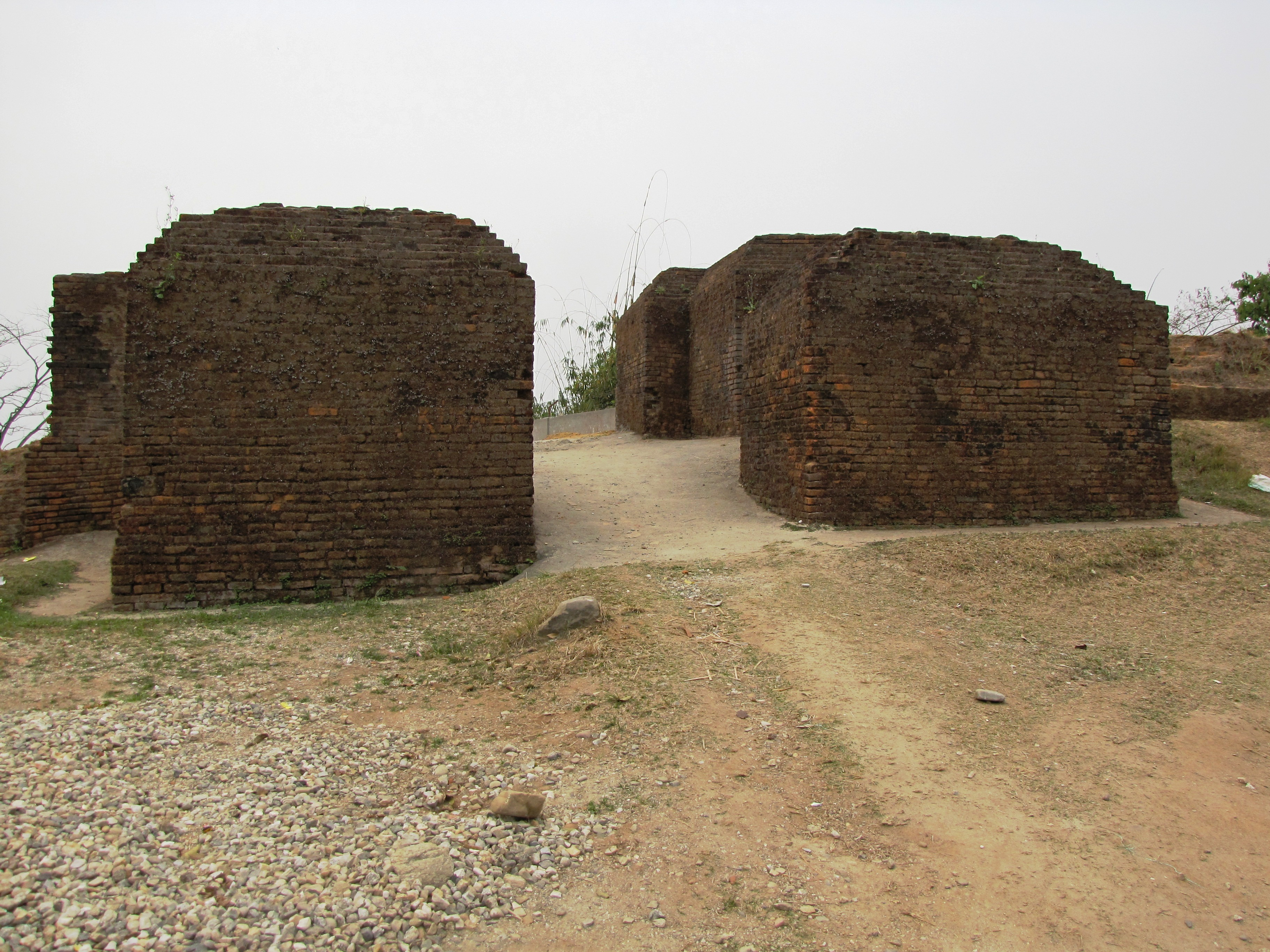
Ita Fort

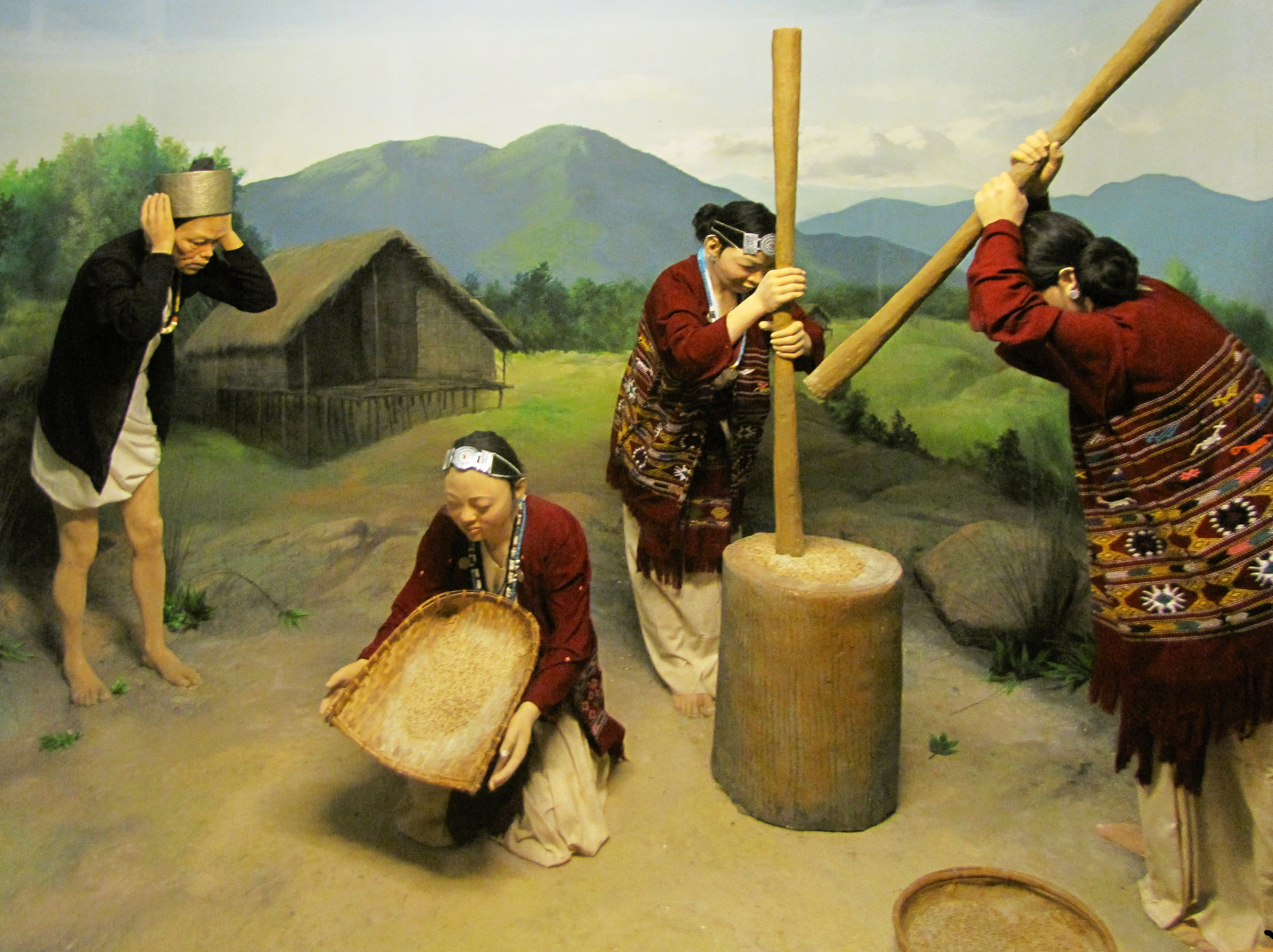
Jawaharlal Nehru Museum, Itanagar

- Ita Fort, one of the most important historical sites in the state of Arunachal Pradesh. The name literally means "Fort of bricks"( brick being called "Ita" in the Assamese language). The Ita Fort was built as early as the 14th or the 15th century. The fort is mainly built with bricks, forming an irregular shape. The total brickwork is of 16,200 cubic meters, which has been identified by some scholars with the Chutiya kingdom. The fort has three different entrances on three different sides, which are the western, eastern, and southern sides.
- Jawaharlal Nehru Museum, Itanagar is also known for showcasing the rich tribal culture of the state.
- Gekar sinyi (Ganga Lake) is a beautiful natural lake which literally means confined lake in the Nyishi dialect. It is surrounded by a landmass of hard rock. Primeval vegetation, orchid masses on tall trees and tree ferns contribute to its popularity as a hot picnic spot and recreation hub. Boating facilities and a swimming pool are available at the site.
- Buddhist monastery [Gompa mandir]

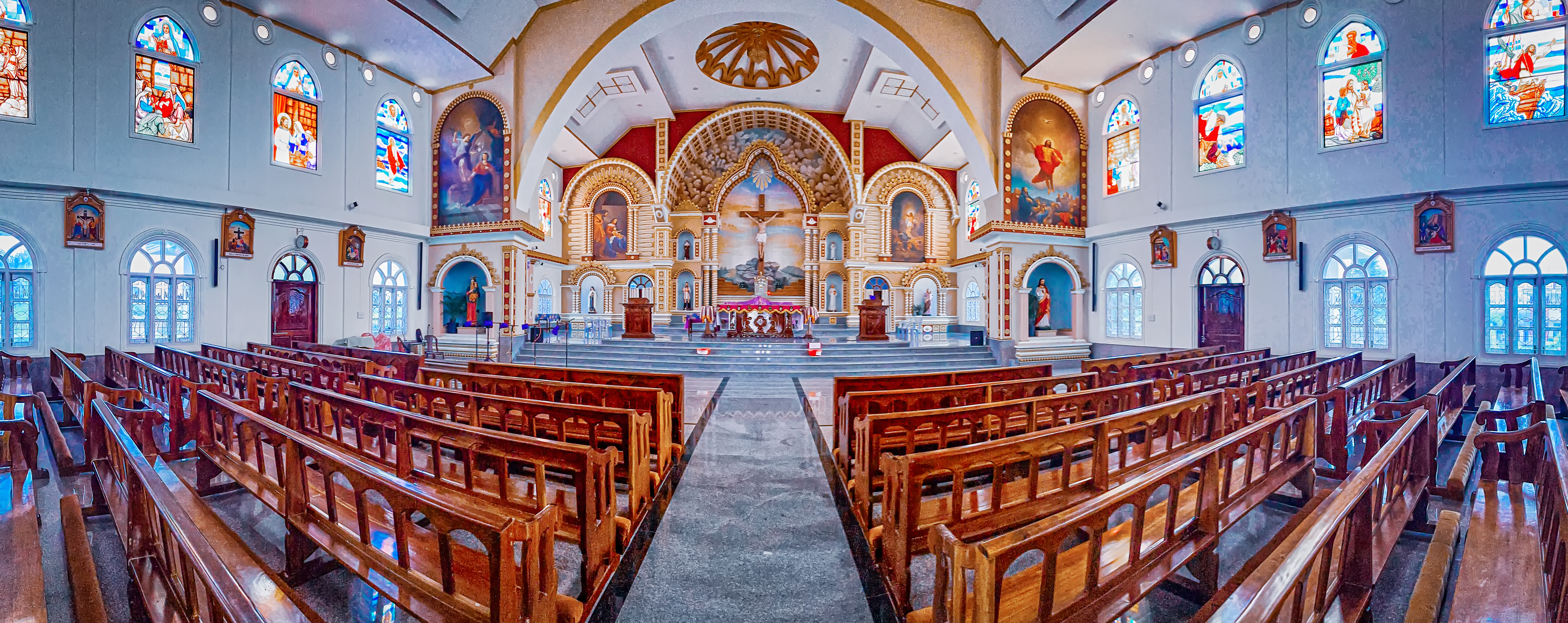
Sacred Heart Church, Naharlagun suburb of Itanagar

== Transport ==
=== Road ===
National Highway 415 connects Itanagar to the rest of the country. Regular bus and taxi services are available from Guwahati.

=== Railway ===
Naharlagun railway station is the nearest railway station, which is nearly 15 km away from the city. Taxi and bus services are easily available from the railway station to Itanagar. Donyi Polo Express can be availed, which runs on all days of the week from Guwahati, and Shatabdi Express is available thrice a week from Guwahati. The Arunachal AC Superfast Express runs between Naharlagun and Anand Vihar Terminal twice a week, which is the only direct train that connects Arunachal Pradesh with the national capital.

=== Air ===
Regular helicopter service is available from Guwahati to Naharlagun. Prime Minister Narendra Modi laid the foundation stone for Itanagar Airport at Hollongi on 9 February 2019. It has been named as Donyi Polo Airport, and was inaugurated on 19 November 2022, with flight services operated by Alliance Air, IndiGo and FlyBig airlines.

== See also ==
- Arunachal Pradesh
- Arunachal Pradesh Legislative Assembly
- Tourism in North East India
