= Boko–Chaygaon Assembly constituency =

Constituency of the Assam legislative assembly in India

Coordinates: 25.98°N 91.24°E

Boko
- Constituency No. 48 for the Assam Legislative Assembly

Constituency details
- Country: India
- Region: Northeast India
- State: Assam
- District: Kamrup
- Lok Sabha constituency: Gauhati
- Established: 1951
- Reservation: ST

Member of Legislative Assembly
- 16th Assam Legislative Assembly
- Incumbent Raju Mesh
- Party: Bhartiya Janata Party
- Elected year: 2026

Boko Assembly constituency is one of the 126 constituencies of Assam Legislative Assembly. This constituency was renamed to Boko–Chaygaon in 2023, after the Chaygaon Assembly constituency was merged into it.

Boko formed part of the Gauhati Lok Sabha constituency. It was one of the Assam constituencies reserved for Scheduled Tribes. Raju Mesh of the Bharatiya Janata Party is the present MLA (as of 2026) for the constituency.

== Town Details ==
Following are details on Boko Assembly constituency

- Eligible Electors as per 2021 General Elections: 2,36,661. Eligible Electors. Male Electors: 85,984. Female Electors: 84,350.
- Total Area Covered: 742 square kilometres.
- Area Includes: Boko thana (excluding Bongaon mouza) in Gauhati sub-division.
- Number of Polling Stations: 238 (2011), 245 (2016), 48 (2021).

== Members of Legislative Assembly ==
Following is the list of past members representing Boko Assembly constituency in Assam Legislature.

Year	Member	Party
1951	Radha Charan Choudhury	Socialist Party
1957	Radha Charan Choudhury	Indian National Congress
1962	Prabin Kumar Chaudhuri	Indian National Congress
1967	Prabin Kumar Chaudhuri	Indian National Congress
1972	Prabin Kumar Chaudhuri	Indian National Congress
1978	Umesh Chandra Das	Janata Party
1983	Upendra Das	Indian National Congress
1985	Gopinath Das	Independent politician
1991	Gopinath Das	Indian National Congress
1996	Jyoti Prasad Das	Asom Gana Parishad
2001	Gopinath Das	Indian National Congress
2006	Jyoti Prasad Das	Asom Gana Parishad
2011	Gopinath Das	All India United Democratic Front
2016	Nandita Das	Indian National Congress
2021	Nandita Das	Indian National Congress
2026	Raju Mesh	Bharatiya Janata Party

== Election results ==
=== 2026 ===
2026 Assam Legislative Assembly election: Boko-Chaygoan
Party	Candidate	Votes	%	±%
BJP	Raju Mesh	1,07,113	63.77	N/A
INC	Ramen Singh Rabha	47,559	28.31	−30.51
National People's Party	Ganseng B. Sangma	7,092	4.22	New
AITC	Bhoglal Rabha	1,178	0.70	−5.43
NOTA	NOTA	1,552	0.98	−0.84
Margin of victory		59,554	35.45	+9.86
Turnout		167,980	85.11	−1.34
Rejected ballots				
Registered electors				
BJP gain from INC		Swing	+4.95	

=== 2021 ===
2021 Assam Legislative Assembly election: Boko
Party	Candidate	Votes	%	±%
INC	Nandita Das	120,613	58.82	+19.13
AGP	Jyoti Prasad Das	68,147	33.23	+3.52
AITC	Gopinath Das	12,571	6.13	New
NOTA	None of the above	3,735	1.82	+0.78
Majority		52,466	25.59	+15.61
Turnout		2,05,066	86.45	−2.60
Registered electors				
INC hold		Swing		

=== 2016 ===
2016 Assam Legislative Assembly election: Boko
Party	Candidate	Votes	%	±%
INC	Nandita Das	69,986	39.69	+8.74
AGP	Jyoti Prasad Das	52,392	29.71	+12.65
AIUDF	Gopinath Das	42,338	24.01	−14.51
Independent	Dr. Ghanashyam Das	5,794	3.28	N/A
Independent	Anirban Das	2,796	1.58	N/A
Independent	Nitish Ranjan Das	1,148	0.65	N/A
NOTA	None of the above	1,851	1.04	N/A
Majority		17,594	9.98	+2.41
Turnout		1,76,305	89.05	+5.78
Registered electors		1,97,963		+16.75
INC gain from AIUDF		Swing	+1.17	

=== 2011 ===
2011 Assam Legislative Assembly election: Boko
Party	Candidate	Votes	%	±%
AIUDF	Gopinath Das	54,388	38.52	
INC	Jayanta Das	43,697	30.95	
AGP	Jyoti Prasad Das	24,086	17.06	
BPF	Prabin Mandal	13,318	9.43	
BJP	Jiten Sarkar	3,656	2.59	
AITC	Niranjan Das	2,050	1.45	
Majority		10,691	7.57	
Turnout		1,41,195	83.27	
Registered electors		1,69,554		
AIUDF gain from AGP		Swing		
