= Jyoti Prasad Das =

Indian politician

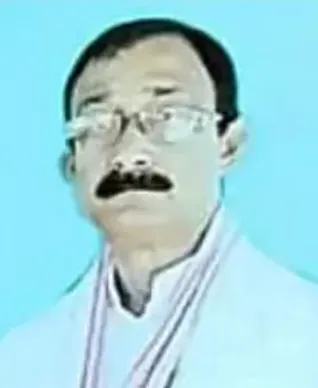
Jyoti Prasad Das

Jyoti Prasad Das is an Indian politician and member of the Asom Gana Parishad. Das was twice a member of the Assam Legislative Assembly member from the Boko constituency in South Kamrup district. He was elected to the state assembly from 1996 to 2001 and again from 2006 to 2011.

== Education ==
He has a bachelor's degree in science from Arya Vidyapeeth College in the year 1981.
