= Gerua, Kamrup =

Gerua
- village
- Location in Assam, India Gerua (India)
- Coordinates: 26.60°N 91.57°E
- Country: India
- State: Assam
- Region: Western Assam
- District: Kamrup

Government
  - Body: Gram panchayat

Languages
  - Official: Assamese
- Time zone: UTC+5:30 (IST)
- PIN: 781102
- Vehicle registration: AS
- Website: kamrup.nic.in

Gerua is a village in Kamrup rural district, in the state of Assam, India, situated in north bank of river Brahmaputra.

== Transport ==
The village is located north of National Highway 27 and connected to nearby towns and cities like Rangiya and Guwahati with regular buses and other modes of transportation.

== See also ==
- Dihina
- Gandhmow
