= Gopinath Das =

Indian politician

Gopinath Das is an Indian politician and member of the Assam Pradesh Congress Committee. Das was a member of the Assam Legislative Assembly from the Boko constituency in South Kamrup district.
