= Boko, Kamrup =

Boko
- Town
- Location in Assam, India Boko (India)
- Coordinates: 25.97777°N 91.23557°E
- Country: India
- State: Assam
- District: Kamrup
- Sub-district: Rangiya

Government
  - Body: Nagar Palika

Languages
  - Official: Assamese
- Time zone: UTC+5:30 (IST)
- PIN: 781123
- ISO 3166 code: IN-AS
- Vehicle registration: AS
- Website: kamrup.nic.in

Boko is a town located in Assam, in the Kamrup district in the Indian state of Assam. The town is composed of 139 villages. It is approximately 60 kilometers west of Guwahati.

== Culture ==
Boko's cultural tradition is known mainly for the Bogai festival, which began in honor of a King Bogai who ruled the area. People visit Boko during this event, because it is the only one of its kind in the region and is the biggest festival held in the South Kamrup area.

Boko is also home to the Suwori (সুঁৱৰি) festival, which has been celebrated in the town for almost a century. This festival is similar to Assam's Bihu, which is celebrated with great fervor and joy by all the indigenous Assamese communities irrespective of caste, creed, religion, faith or belief. The festival coincides with Rongali Bihu.

== Transport ==
Boko is accessible through National Highway 17 which connects it to nearby cities and towns. It has good communication infrastructure, which effectively connects it with the state of Meghalaya. It is an important jump-off location for people travelling to Hahim, Langpih, Chamaria, Malang, and Nagarbera. The nearest railway station is in Belpara, 44 kilometres from LGBI Airport. Boko is 59 kilometres away from district headquarters in Amingaon.

== Demographics ==
The population of Boko constituency based on the 2011 census is 111,880. The average sex ratio of Boko is 983 women to 1000 men, or 56,415 males and 55,465 females.

== Places of interest ==
- Parvati Pahar - Notable historical sites of South Kamrup is the famous shrine of the temple of Maa Parvati Devi in Boko Parbati Hills. Located about four kilometres northwest of Boko city, this heritage Parbati hill gathers lakhs of devotees on the day of Sot-Bahagar Sankranti and on the day of Goru Bihu. Located at an altitude of about 1500 feet above the plains. Devotees climb the hill along the road and look for the blessings of Maa Parvati.
- Satras - Satras in Boko include Bhalukghata Satra, Haripur Satra and Chamaria Satra. Among them, Chamaria Satra is the oldest and largest. Sri Sri Bar Vishnu Than, Chamaria Satra located at Chamaria is known to be one of the oldest satras in Assam, while the Chamaria satra was established in 1588. This well-known satra is situated about 22 km from town.
- Hahim - The Hahim Picnic Spot is located at the juncture of Assam, Arunachal Pradesh, Bhutan on the foothills of Meghalaya. The area attracts a large crowd and is considered as one of the most popular picnic spots in Assam. Hahim is a less populated village in Assam with very few people residing here.
- Langpih - a hamlet cradled in the hilly terrains of Assam bordering Meghalaya, a neighbouring state. Being more rural, the region is known for being quiet, and having less overall pollution, but lacking health services, schools, electricity, and sanitation. With a population of about eleven thousand, mostly Nepalis and Khasis, Langpih falls under the Boko subdivision of Kamrup district in Assam. Agriculture and livestock rearing continue to be the mainstay of its people.
- Malangkona Sildubi - A waterfall near Malangkona village, Assam.
- Batakuchi

== Education ==
Boko is an important educational centre. Jawaharlal Nehru College is one of the important educational institutions in this place.

== Politics ==
The Asom Gana Parishad, Bharatiya Janata Party and Indian National Congress are the major political parties in this area. Boko comes under the Boko (SC) constituency and Rabha Hasong Autonomous Council. Currently (2025) Nandita Das of the Congress is the Member of the Legislative Assembly.

Members of Legislative Assembly from Boko:

- 1951: Radha Charan Choudhury, Socialist Party
- 1957: Radha Charan Choudhury, Indian National Congress
- 1962: Prabin Kumar Choudhury, Indian National Congress
- 1967: Prabin Kumar Choudhury, Indian National Congress
- 1972: Prabin Kumar Choudhury, Indian National Congress
- 1978: Umesh Chandra Das, Janata Party
- 1983: Upendra Das, Indian National Congress
- 1985: Gopinath Das, Independent
- 1991: Gopinath Das, Indian National Congress
- 1996: Jyoti Prasad Das, Asom Gana Parishad
- 2001: Gopinath Das, Indian National Congress
- 2006: Jyoti Prasad Das, Asom Gana Parishad
- 2011: Gopinath Das, All India United Democratic Front
- 2016: Nandita Das, Indian National Congress
- 2021: Nandita Das ( Indian National Congress)

== See also ==
- Chaygaon
- Palasbari
