= Bongra =

- village
- Location in Assam, India Bongra (India)
- Coordinates: 26.09°N 91.54°E
- Country: India
- State: Assam
- Region: Western Assam
- District: Kamrup

Government
  - Body: Gram panchayat

Languages
  - Official: Assamese
- Time zone: UTC+5:30 (IST)
- PIN: 781015
- Vehicle registration: AS
- Website: kamrup.nic.in

Bongra is a village in Kamrup rural district, in the state of Assam, India, situated in south bank of river Brahmaputra.

== Transport ==
The village is located near National Highway 31 and connected to nearby towns and cities like Bijoynagar and Guwahati with regular buses and other modes of transportation. It is in close proximity of Gauhati Airport.

== See also ==
- Bondapara
- Bihdia
