= Bargaon, Kamrup =

Bargaon
- village
- Location in Assam, India Bargaon (India)
- Coordinates: 26.22°N 91.63°E
- Country: India
- State: Assam
- Region: Western Assam
- District: Kamrup

Government
  - Body: Gram panchayat

Languages
  - Official: Assamese
  - Native: Kamrupi
- Time zone: UTC+5:30 (IST)
- PIN: 781104
- Vehicle registration: AS
- Website: kamrup.nic.in

Bargaon is a village in Kamrup rural district, in the state of Assam, India, situated on the north bank of the river Brahmaputra.

== Transport ==
The village is near National Highway 27 and connected to nearby towns and cities such as Changsari, Baihata and North Guwahati, Guwahati with regular buses and other modes of transportation.

== See also ==
- Bardekpar
- Bardangrikuchi
