= Radha Kuchi =

- Village
- Location in Assam, India Radha Kuchi (India)
- Coordinates: 26.34519°N 91.72640°E
- Country: India
- State: Assam
- District: Kamrup

Area
  - Total: 5 km^{2} (1.9 sq mi)

Population
  - Total: 2,000

Radha Kuchi is a village near the town of Baihata, Kamrup district, Assam, India.

== Location ==
Radha Kuchi is about 1 kilometer away from the Indian town of Baihata. Nanara, Aagdola and Nagaon are the neighboring villages of Radha Kuchi. It belongs to the Karara Gaon Panchayat and the Bihdia block.

== Festivals ==
The Magh Bihu is the main festival of the village, but villagers also celebrate Kati Bihu, Rongal, Bihu functions, Maha Shivaratri and Laxmi Puja. Magh Bihu is largely celebrated in this village, and the Bihu is a part of three Bihu according to Assamese mythology. Maha Shivratri is also celebrated by the village's large Hindu population.

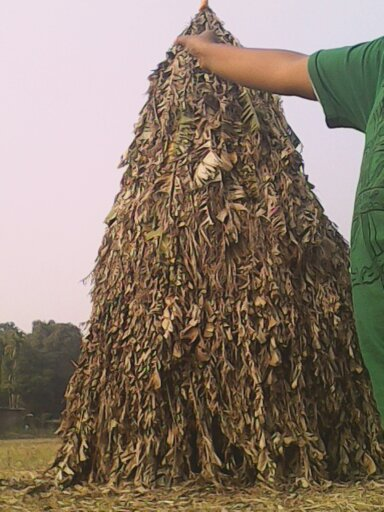
Meji of Magh Bihu

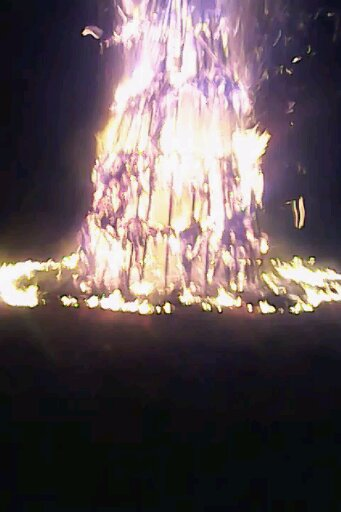
A Magh Bihu Meji burning in Assam, India, as part of the festival Bihu in Assam

== Places ==
Radha kuchi village is a village with many small parts where people from different casts and religion live. The main parts are Hindu chuburi and Muslim chuburi.
