= Bardekpar =

- village
- Location in Assam, India Bardekpar (India)
- Coordinates: 26.33°N 91.66°E
- Country: India
- State: Assam
- Region: Western Assam
- District: Kamrup

Government
  - Body: Gram panchayat

Languages
  - Official: Assamese
  - Native: Kamrupi
- Time zone: UTC+5:30 (IST)
- PIN: 781382
- Vehicle registration: AS
- Website: kamrup.nic.in

Bardekpar is a village in Kamrup rural district, in the state of Assam, India, situated in north bank of river Brahmaputra.

The village is near National Highway 27.

== See also ==
- Bargaon
- Bardangrikuchi
