= Deuduar =

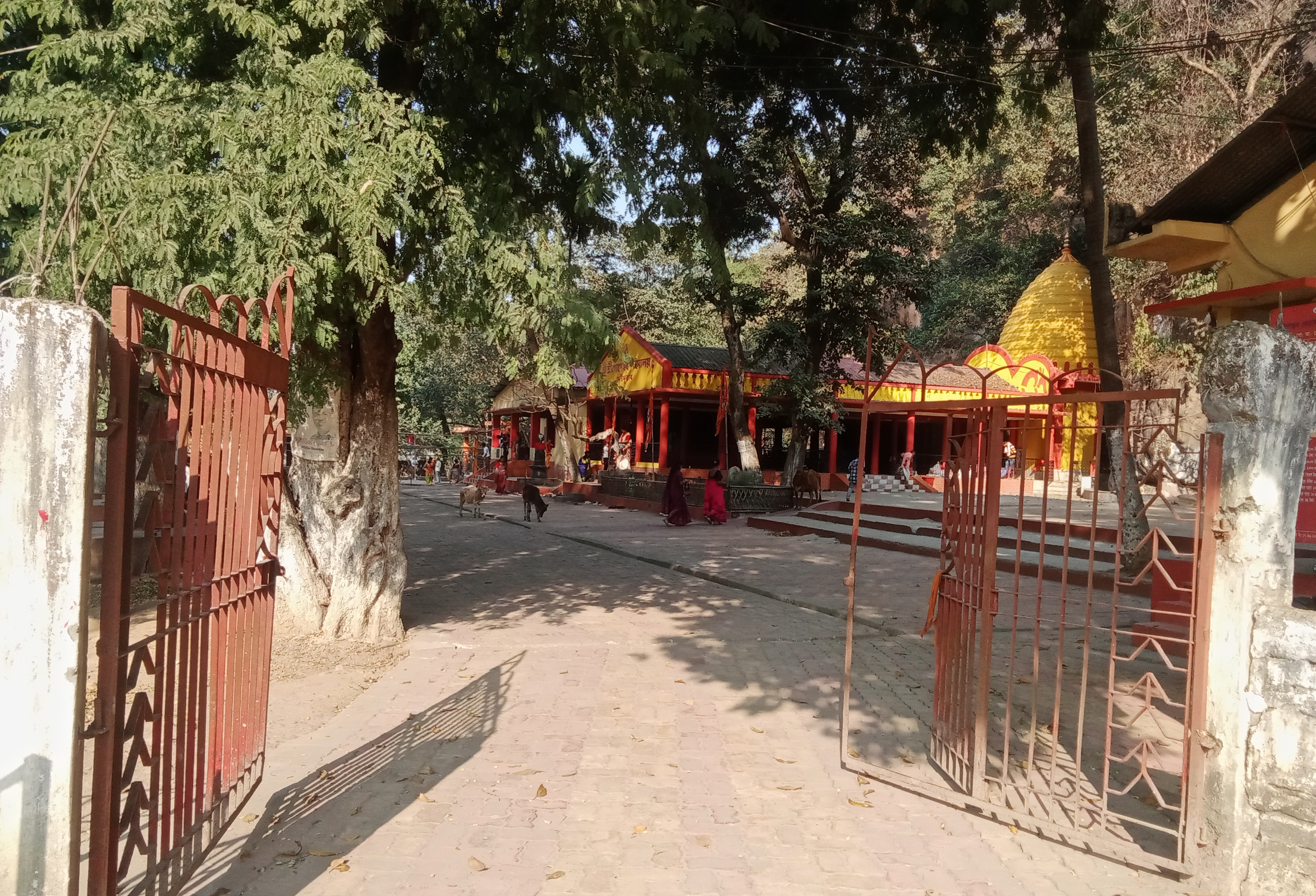
Gopeswar Devalaya, a devotional place with mysterious stories of Lord Shiva and Goddess Parvati. Also known as Gupteswar or Hidden God

Deuduar is a mid-sized village located in the district of Kamrup in the state of Assam in India. It has a population of about 3500 persons living in around 300 households. It is situated almost 30 km away Guwahati. The 31 natioanal highway goes through midflr of this village. Most of the villagers are farmers. Some are stonecutters. There has been gradual destruction of Gopeshwar Hill by stonecutters.

== History ==
In assamese "Deu" means God and "duar" means gate. The name Deuduar literally means "gate of God". There is a famous temple name Gopeshwar Dewaloi in this village. The eastern part of this village is covered by a hill called "Gopeshwar Pahar ". Gopeswar means lord Shiva. In myth it is said lord Shiva used to come in Gopeshwar Dewaloi. The Gopeshwar hill is also associated with two famous things one is Madan Kamdev and Parvati guha (guha means cave). Those women or couple not becoming parents use to come in parvati guha for prayer. There are many example where such couple become parents after offering Puja in Parvati cave.
