= Madan Kamdev =

Archaeological site in Kamrup, Assam

Coordinates: 26°19′11″N 91°44′27″E

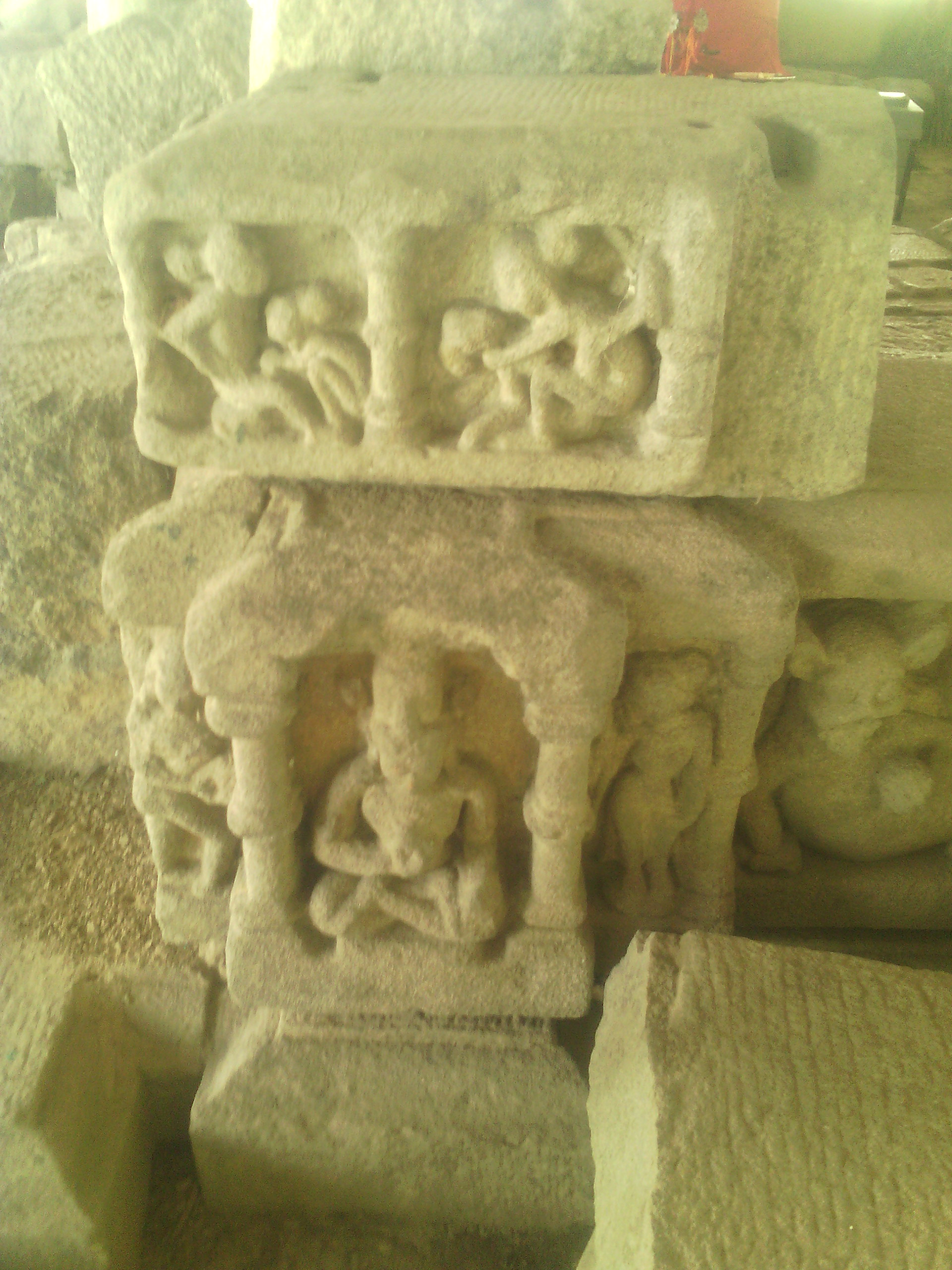

- Location within Assam Location within India
- Type: Archaeological site
- Associated with: Palas
- Location: Baihata Chariali
- Region: Kamrup
- Part of: Kamrup Kingdom

History
- Built: 9th – 10th century C.E

Site notes
- Archaeologists: Archaeological Survey of India, Pradeep Sarma and others
- Condition: Renovated
- Owner: Archaeological Survey of India
- Management: Archaeological Survey of India
- Public access: Open

Madan Kamdev (Pron: ˈmʌdən/məˈdɑ:n kæmˈdeɪv/ˈkʌmˌdeɪv) is an archaeological site in Baihata Chariali, Kamrup, Assam. The place dates back to the 9th and 10th century A.D. The excavation and ruins is dated back to the Pala dynasty.

The ruins of Madan Kamdev are scattered widely in a secluded place, covering 500 meters. Temple of Kamdev must be reconstruction, Uma Maheshwar's embraced idols, carved on the stones of medieval temples, can be seen here. The most prominent statues are of the Sun, Ganesha, and Vidyadhara

== Discovery and excavation ==
Archeologists differed on the issue of when and who constructed these temples. Dr. Pradeep Sharma, assistant director of the Archaeological Directorate of Assam, suggests that the description in the Journal of Asiatic society of Bengal of 1855 by Edward Dalton about the ruins of 15 temple found around the Silsako Bridge (a historical bridge destroyed in the 1897 Assam earthquake) might have referred to Madan Kamdev.

In 1943 and 1949, Tarnikant Sharma, inspector of primary education, affirmed this information in an article published by the Assam research society (Kamarupa Anusandhan Samiti). No excavations were conducted for more than a quarter century after this article. During that period, religious people of the villages took the previous statues away, or hunters carried them from one place to another.

In 1977, the Archaeological Directorate of Assam took over the responsibility for this area. They started the excavations of the statues under the supervision of Dr. Pradeep Sharma. In addition to the main temple, his team found ruins of 12 more temples. Analysis of the temples and the idols engraved on the walls, led them to conclude these were constructed from the 10th century to the 12th century.

Statues of Bhairav with six heads, a four-headed Shiva, Kalpavriksha, Sun various Apsara, Vishnu with six heads, Saraswati and various other statues of animals have been identified as being from here.

== Environment ==
In the year 1977, when this area was protected and exploration and preservation began, the hill was surrounded by immense variety of forests, filled with snakes, scorpions, and wild animals such as deer and tigers. Birds sing and chirp in the trees. Right below the Kamdev, the River Madankuri flows in the east and towards the north. Beneath the hill is a vast stretch of swampy land; a chain of hills of Gopeshwar runs from the north to west, and Natuar nacha and Sangsari in the east. Puranic beliefs are still based on Madan Kamdev. One account says that God Shiva in a spurt of fury had burnt the god of love, Kam or Madan, to cinders. Madan was reborn at this place.

== Architecture ==
Madan-Kamdev is the main temple, with ruins of other huge and small temples scattered around it. Representatives of the Architectural Directorate believe that excavation may reveal an additional twelve temples.

Near Madan Kamdev, an old temple of lord Shiva, known here as Gopeshwar, is located in the village of Deuduar. Nearby is a large cave known as Parvati Guha (Parvati Cave), after his consort.

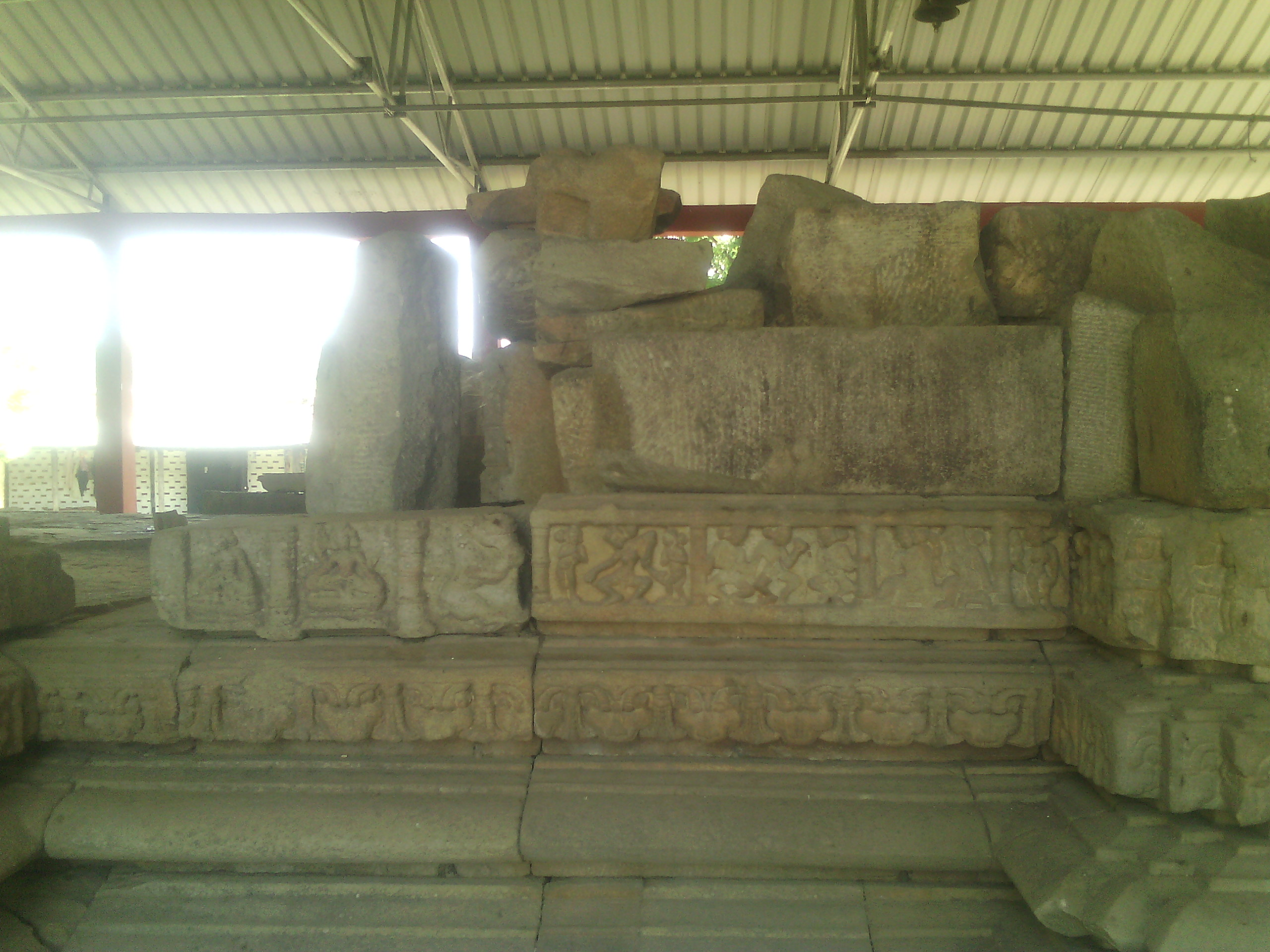

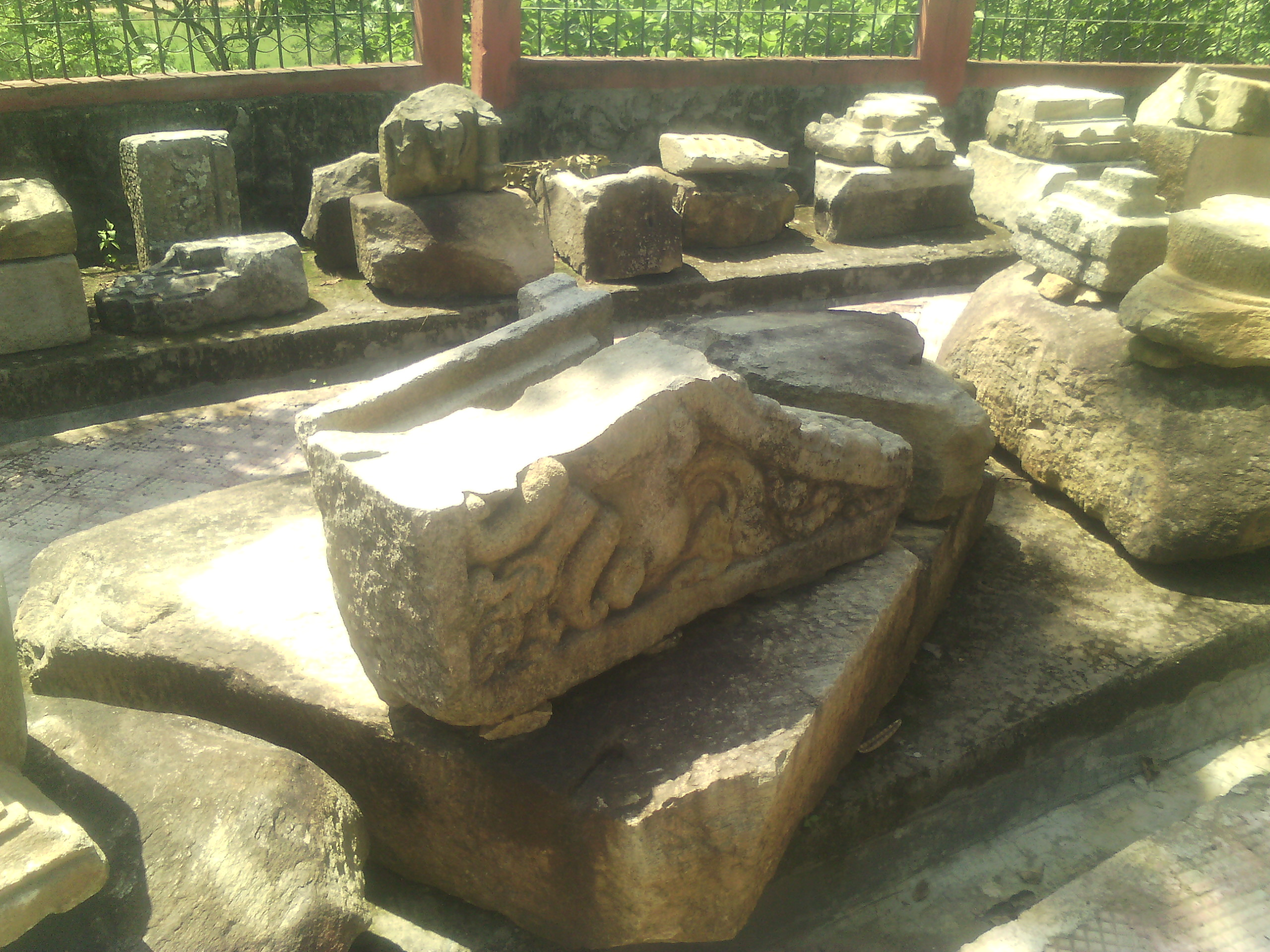

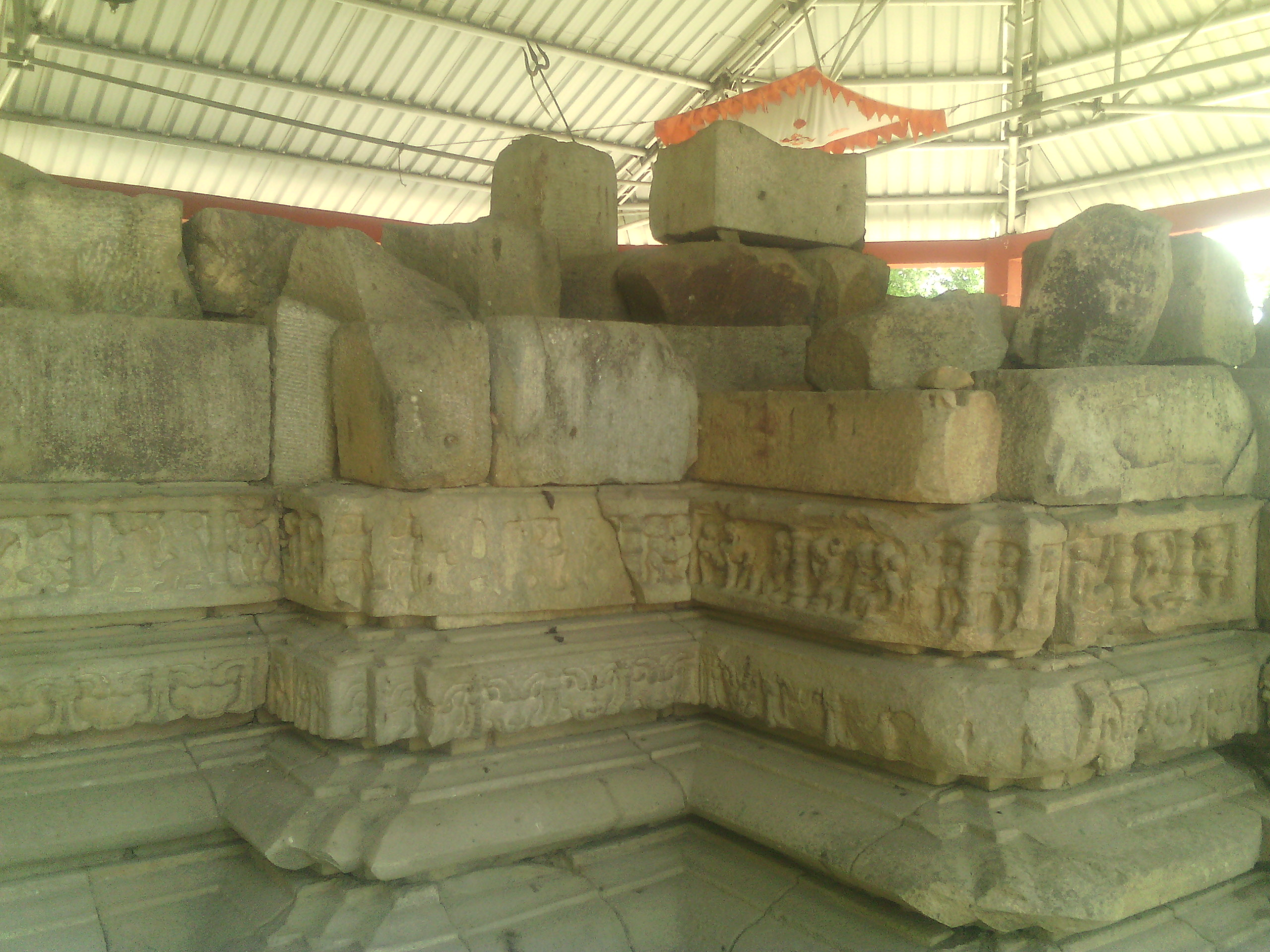

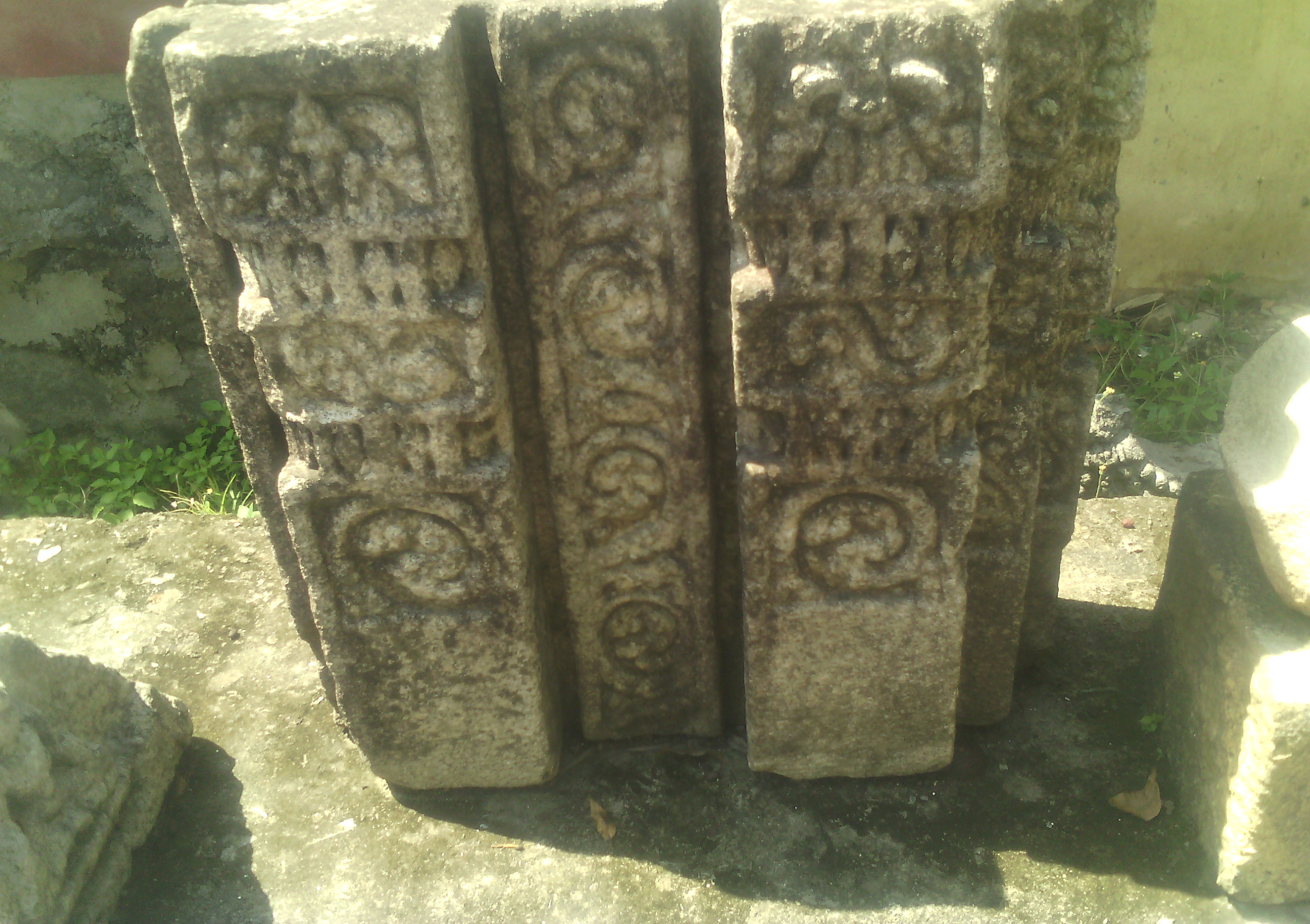

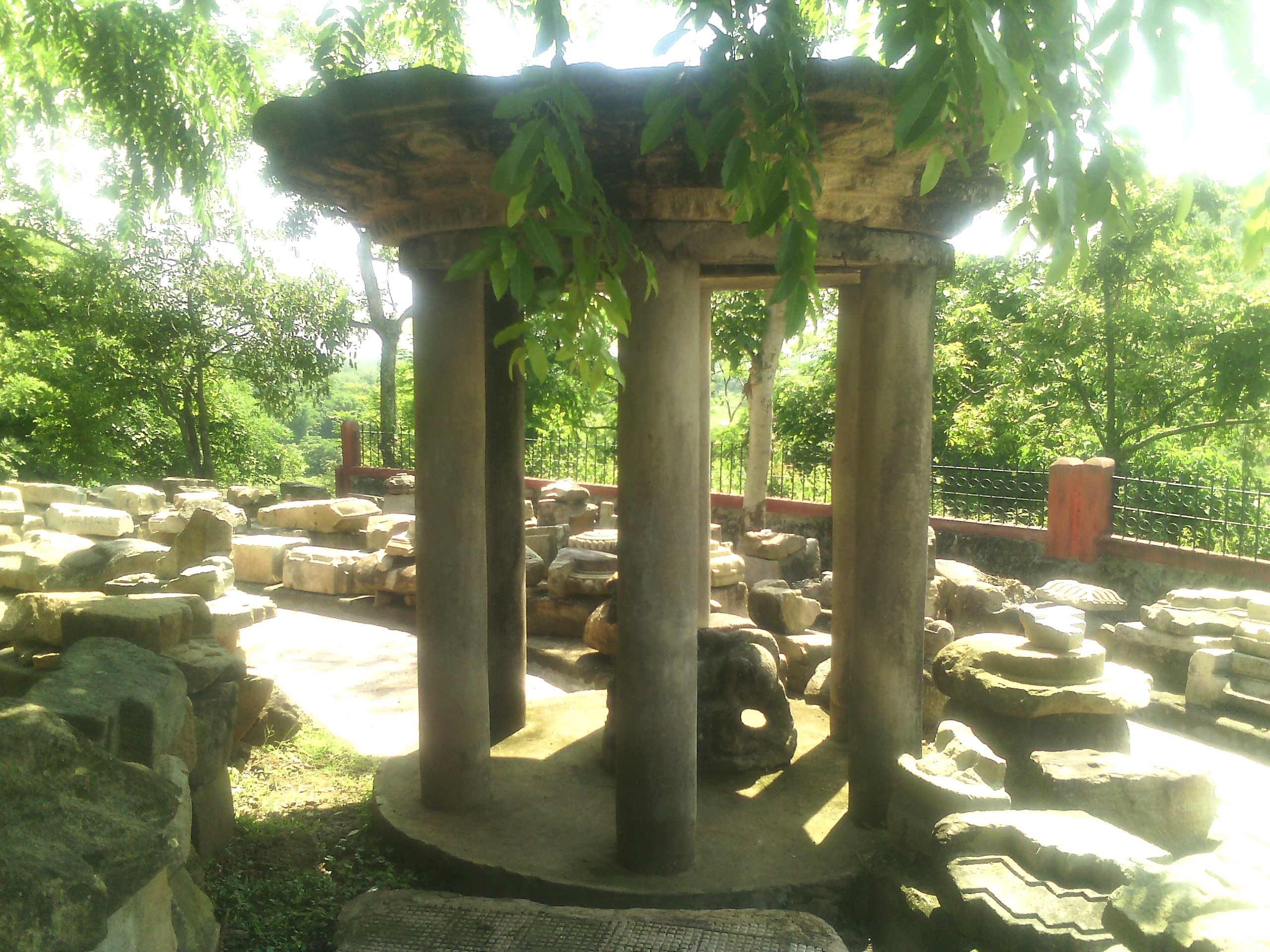

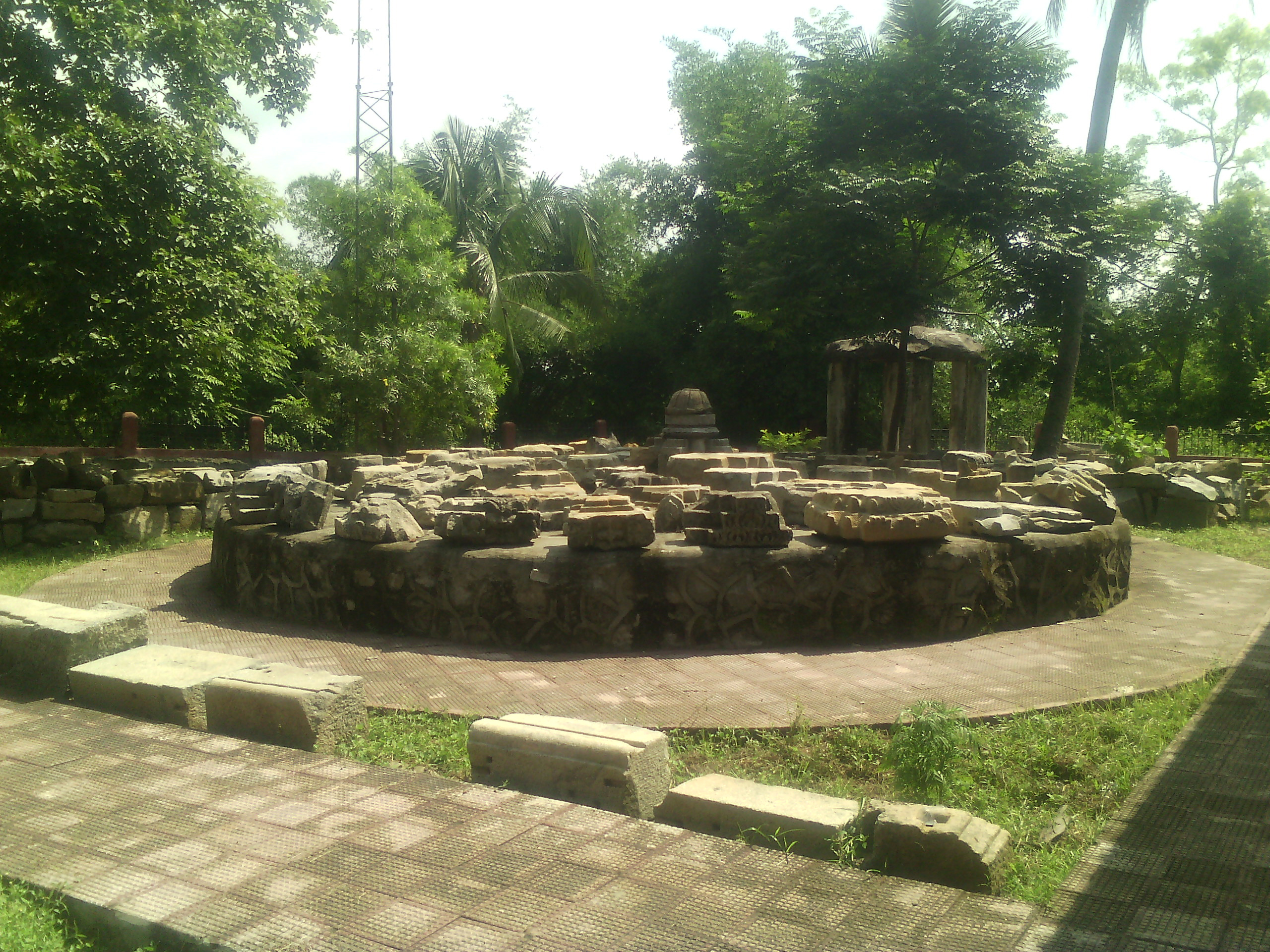

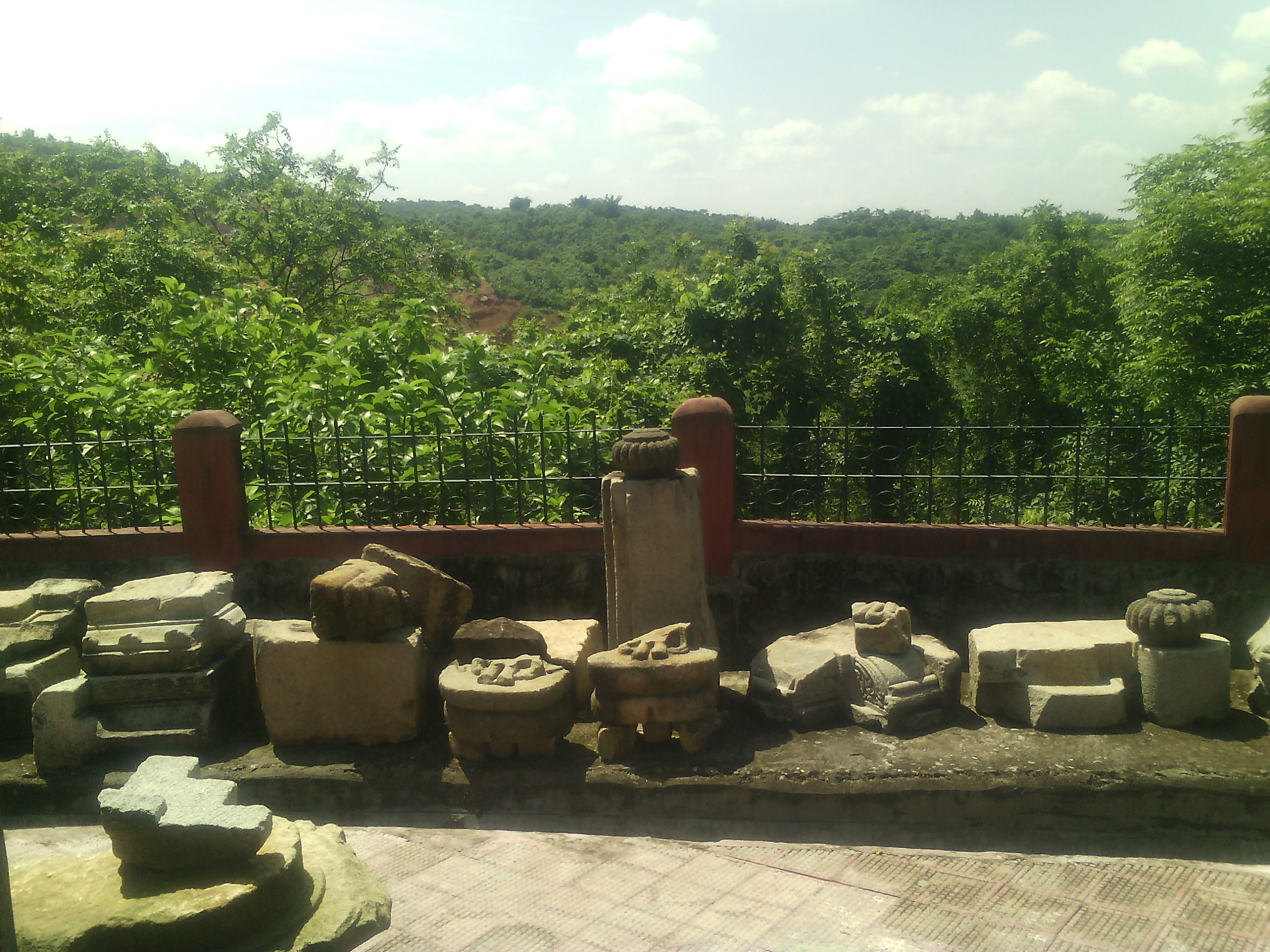

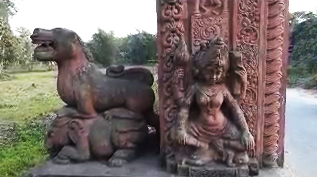

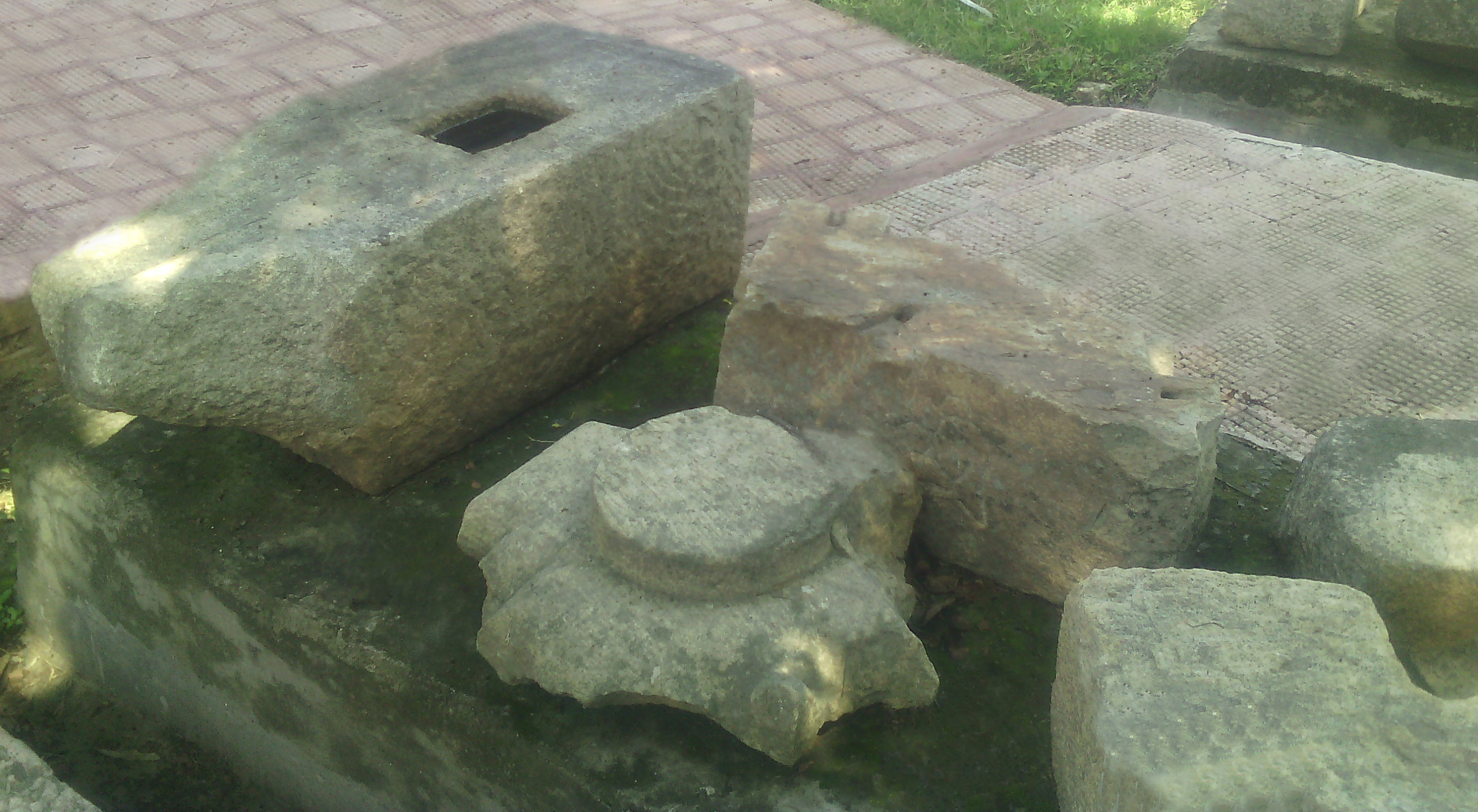

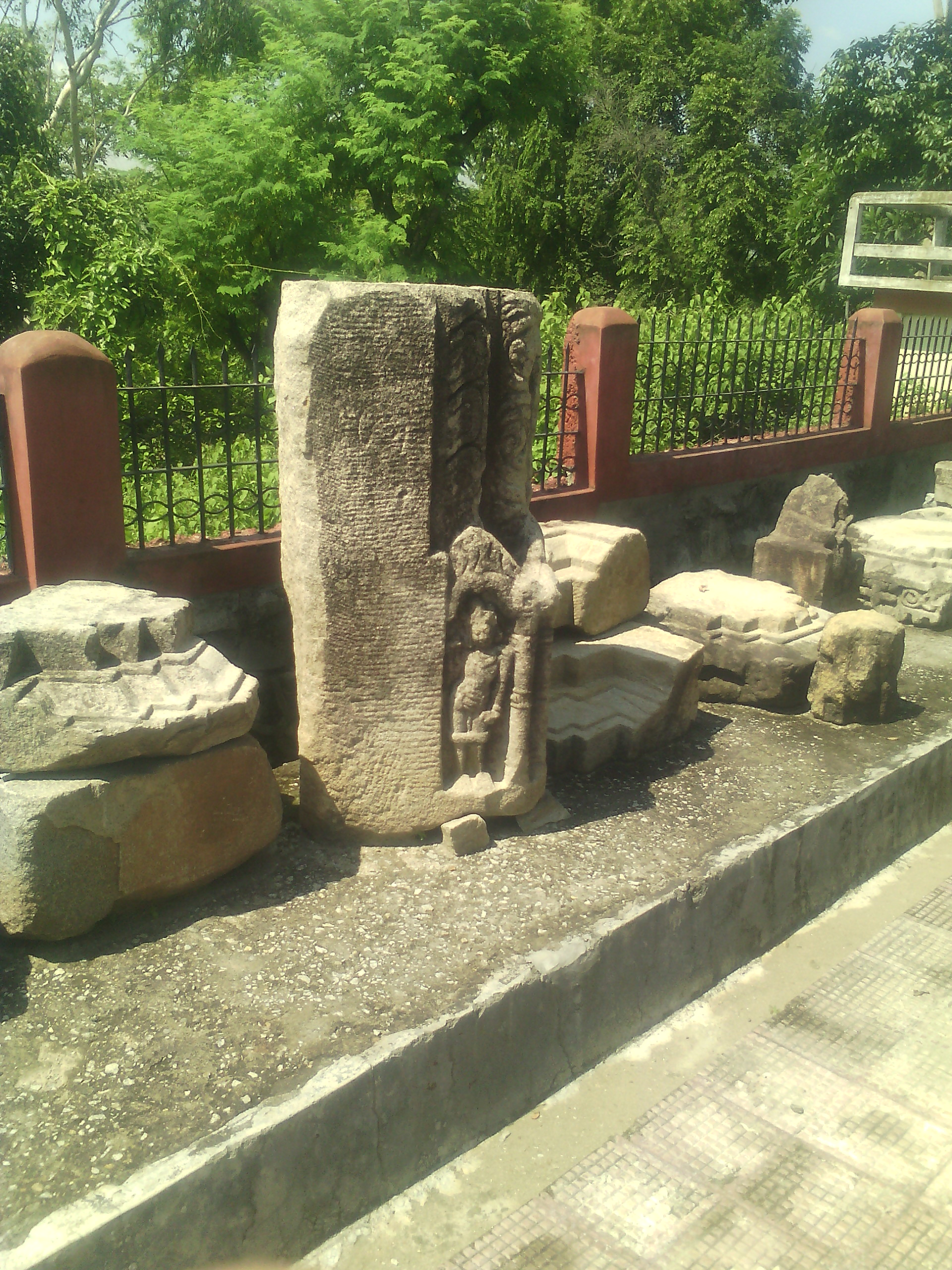

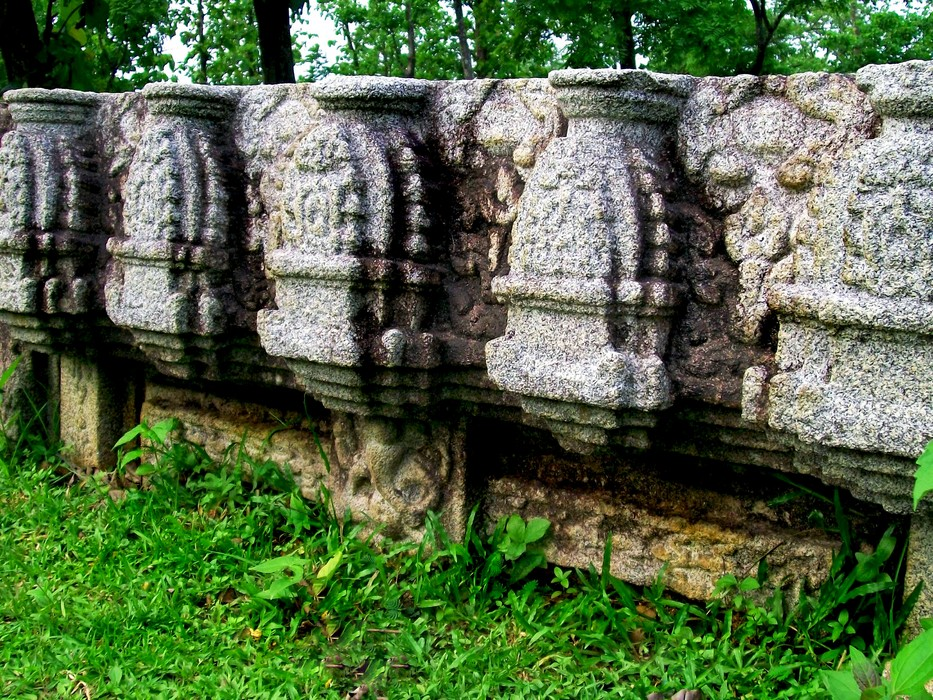

== See also ==
- Khajuraho
- Deopahar
