= Baihata =

Location in Assam, India

Baihata Chariali Baihata Town Square
- Town
- Location in Assam, India Baihata Chariali (India)
- Coordinates: 26.3451°N 91.7264°E
- Country: India
- State: Assam
- District: Kamrup
- Sub-district: Rangiya
- Elevation: 46 m (151 ft)

Languages
  - Official: Assamese
  - Native: Kamrupi
- Time zone: UTC+5:30 (IST)
- PIN: 781381
- ISO 3166 code: IN-AS
- Vehicle registration: AS
- Website: kamrup.nic.in

Baihata Chariali (Pron: baɪˈhɑ:tə ˈʧɑ:rɪˌɑ:lɪ) is an outgrowth urban centre of Guwahati town in the Kamrup Rural district of Assam, India; situated at northern side of the Brahmaputra River. The place is called Chariali, as it is a major road junction where National Highway 27 interconnects with National Highway 15.

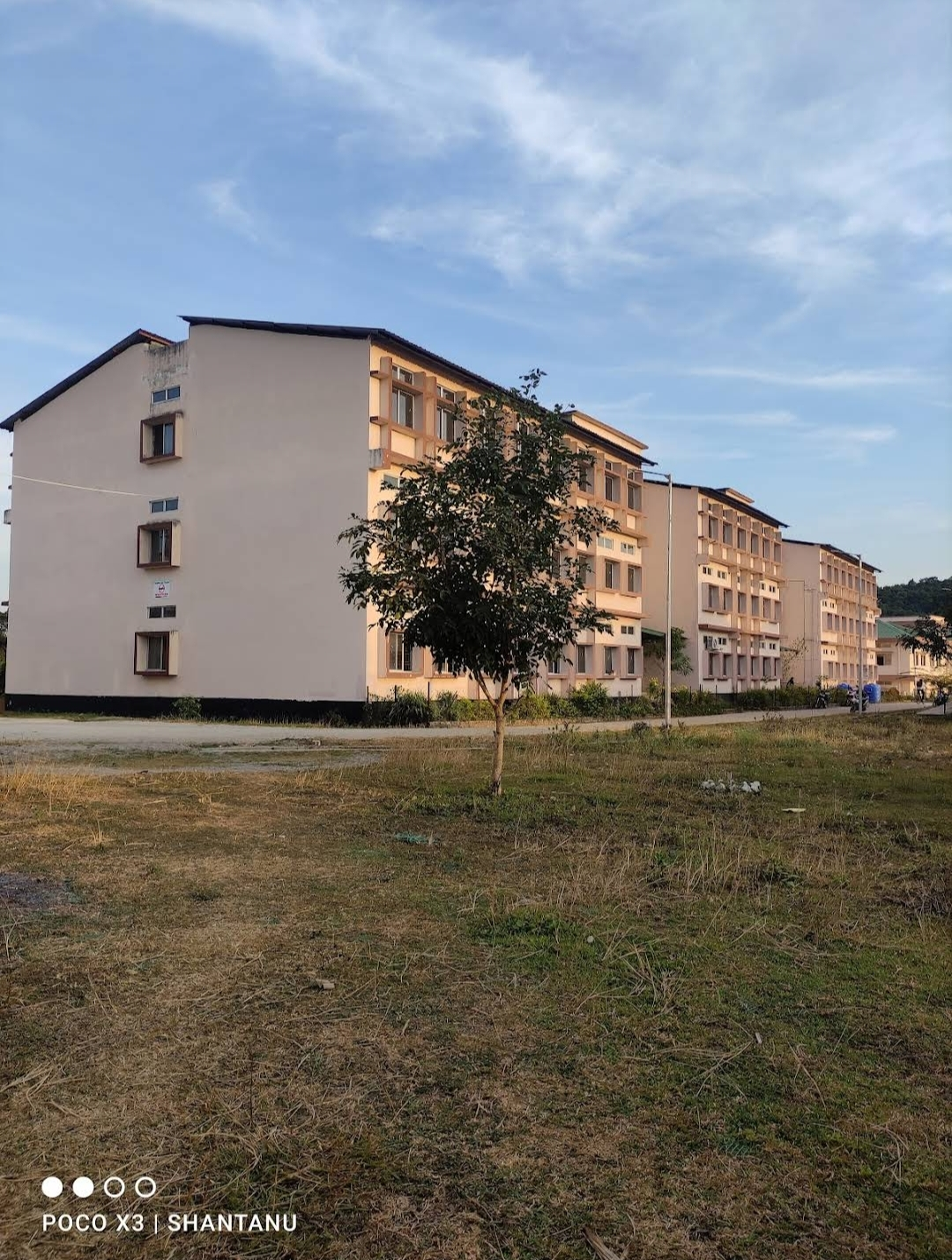
Kamrup Polytechnic back view

== Education ==
Delhi Public School, Kamrup is situated there. The Pub Kamrup college which is affiliated to University of Gauhati is also there.

== Place of interest ==
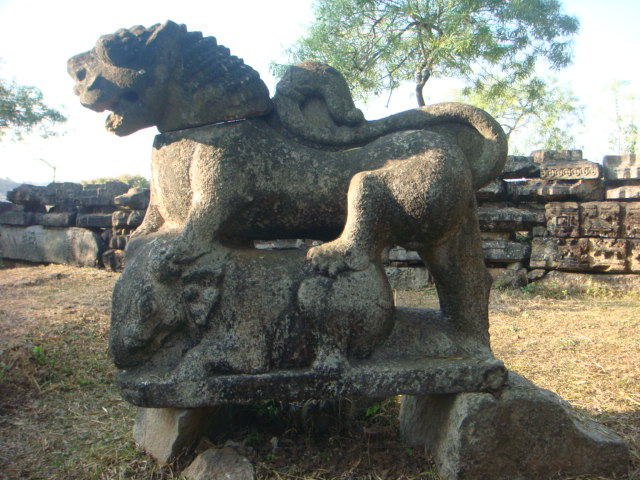
Madan Kamdev

The Madan Kamdev archeological site built by the Pala dynasty of Kamrup Kingdom is located there.

== Transport ==
Baihata Chariali is situated at National Highway 27 and is connected with nearby towns like Rangia, Nalbari and Guwahati. The Baihata Railway Station is 3 km from the town center.

== See also ==
- Kamalpur
- Bijoynagar
