= List of people from Assam =

This is a list of notable people from Assam, India.

== Administrators, diplomats and justices ==
- Fakhruddin Ali Ahmed, 5th president of India; first Assamese to be the president of India
- Devakanta Barua, first Assamese to be the president of Indian National Congress
- Ananda Ram Baruah, first Indian district magistrate in India; first person to qualify for the civil services (ICS) from Assam and sixth from India; first graduate from Assam; Sanskrit scholar
- Ranjan Gogoi, 46th Chief Justice of India, first Assamese and also the first person from northeast to held this prestigious position
- Bishnuram Medhi, Governor of Madras State from January 1958 to May 1964; first Assamese governor of an Indian state
- Gopinath Bordoloi, Prime Minister of Assam before independence;Chief Minister after independence; politician; writer; first Bharat Ratna awardee from Assam
- Parbati Kumar Goswami, first Assamese Justice in Supreme Court of India
- Harishankar Brahma, first election commissioner of India from Assam and the second from North-East India
- Baharul Islam, judge of the Supreme Court of India
- Anowara Taimur, First lady Chief Minister of Assam
- Jamchonga Nampui, first person from Scheduled Tribe of Assam to qualify for the civil services (IAS)

== Academicians and scholars ==
- Krishna Kanta Handiqui, A Sanskrit scholar, an Indologist and philanthropist from Assam
- Nabakanta Barua, A prominent Assamese novelist and poet
- Amalendu Guha, An eminent Marxist historian, poet and a littérateur from Assam.
- Mamoni Raisom Goswami, an Indian writer, poet, professor, scholar and editor
- K M Baharul Islam, professor at Indian Institute of Management Kashipur, Fellow, Indian Institute of Advanced Study
- Jugal Kalita, a professor and department chair of computer science at the College of Engineering and Applied Science within the University of Colorado, Colorado Springs (UCCS)
- Mrinal Miri
- Bhabendra Nath Saikia
- Indira Miri
- Kumud Kalita, Educator and writer

== Performing artists ==
=== Actors and models ===
- Pramathesh Barua
- Jamuna Baruah
- Kashmiri Saikia Baruah
- Kenny Basumatary
- Jaya Battacharya
- Jaya Seal
- Ashima Bhalla
- Aimee Baruah
- Biju Phukan
- Devoleena Bhattacharjee
- Jupitora Bhuyan
- Barsha Rani Bishaya
- Seema Biswas
- Jatin Bora
- Kopil Bora
- Panchi Bora
- Pranami Bora
- Asha Bordoloi
- Parineeta Borthakur
- Plabita Borthakur
- Priyadarshini Chatterjee, Femina Miss India 2016
- Rewati Chetri
- Chetana Das
- Rimpi Das
- Tapan Das
- Utpal Das
- Angoorlata Deka
- Monikangana Dutta
- Zubeen Garg
- Amrita Gogoi
- Moloya Goswami
- Nishita Goswami
- Nipon Goswami
- Aideu Handique
- Ashraful Haque
- Diganta Hazarika
- Adil Hussain
- Baharul Islam
- Pabitra Rabha
- Rishi Kaushik
- Urmila Mahanta
- Shamin Mannan
- Mohini
- Moghai Ojah
- Rati Pandey
- Papon
- Prastuti Parashar
- Renu Saikia
- Brajanath Sarma
- Phani Sarma
- Ravi Sarma
- Arunima Sharma
- Dipannita Sharma
- Mahika Sharma
- Tara
- Zerifa Wahid

=== Film directors ===
- Jyoti Prasad Agarwala
- Pramathesh Barua
- Jahnu Baruah
- Munin Barua
- Manju Bora
- Bhupen Hazarika
- Zubeen Garg
- Reema Kagti
- Bhabendra Nath Saikia
- Phani Sarma
- Parvati Prasad Baruva
- Samarendra Narayan Dev
- Lakshyadhar Choudhury
- Suman Haripriya
- Rima Das
- Biswajeet Bora
- Rajni Basumatary
- Simple Gogoi
- Kenny Basumatary

=== Musicians ===
- Kalikaprasad Bhattacharya - folk musician
- Jyoti Prasad Agarwala
- Bishnu Prasad Rabha
- Bhupen Hazarika
- Parvati Prasad Baruva
- Dipali Barthakur, singer
- Khagen Mahanta
- Ramen Baruah, composer
- Pratima Barua Pandey
- Rameshwar Pathak
- Parveen Sultana- singer
- Jayanta Hazarika - composer, singer
- Beauty Sharma Barua
- Rudra Baruah
- Manas Robin - composer
- Bhitali Das - singer
- Zubeen Garg - composer, singer
- Papon - composer, singer
- Joi Barua - singer
- Janam Raj - singer, composer
- Sagarika - singer, actress
- Kalpana Patowary - singer
- Jim Ankan Deka - singer
- Dhrubajyoti Phukan
- Queen Hazarika - singer
- Mayukh Hazarika
- Padmanav Bordoloi - singer
- Simanta Shekhar - singer
- Anindita Paul - singer
- Anurag Saikia - composer

== Activists ==
- Kiran Bala Bora, freedom fighter and social activist
- Muzammil Haque, first martyr of Madhyam movement.
- Nabin Chandra Bardoloi, freedom fighter, social activist and writer
- Akhil Gogoi
- Hema Bharali, freedom fighter and social activist
- Birubala Rabha, social activist
- Chobilal Upadhyaya, freedom fighter and Nepali social activist

== Journalists ==
- Siva Prasad Barooah
- Arnab Goswami
- Ananda Chandra Barua
- Radha Govinda Baruah, founder of The Assam Tribune
- Parag Kumar Das
- Gauri Shankar Kalita
- Mahendra Nath Deka Phukan
- Khiren Roy
- Wasbir Hussain

== Writers ==
- Amrit Bhushan Dev Adhikari
- Ananda Chandra Agarwala
- Chandra Kumar Agarwala
- Jyoti Prasad Agarwala
- Nabin Chandra Bardoloi
- Debo Prasad Barooah
- Amulya Barua
- Ananda Chandra Barua
- Binanda Chandra Barua
- Chandradhar Barua
- Hem Barua
- Hem Barua (Tyagbir)
- Hemchandra Barua
- Jahnavi Barua
- Jnanadabhiram Barua
- Kanaklal Barua
- Nabakanta Barua
- Ananda Ram Baruah
- Bhubanmohan Baruah
- Padmanath Gohain Baruah
- Parvati Prasad Baruva
- Lakshminath Bezbaroa
- Debananda Bharali
- Chandra Bharati
- Birendra Kumar Bhattacharya
- Kamalakanta Bhattacharya
- Nalinidhar Bhattacharya
- Hiren Bhattacharyya
- Bhattadeva
- Nakul Chandra Bhuyan
- Dhrubajyoti Bora
- Mahim Bora
- Satyanath Bora
- Rajanikanta Bordoloi
- Homen Borgohain
- Abani Chakraborty
- Saurabh Kumar Chaliha
- Raghunath Choudhary
- Ambika Charan Choudhury
- Lakshyadhar Choudhury
- Rebati Mohan Dutta Choudhury
- Mithinga Daimary
- Jogesh Das
- Birendra Nath Datta (1935-)
- Bhabananda Deka
- Harekrishna Deka
- Nalini Bala Devi
- Robin Dey
- Utpal Dutta
- Srutimala Duara
- Jatindra Nath Duwara
- Bhusana Dvija
- Pitambar Dvija
- Gopalacharana Dwija
- Ganesh Gogoi
- Hiren Gohain
- Gopaldev
- Hemchandra Goswami
- Sarat Chandra Goswami
- Krishna Kanta Handique
- Atul Chandra Hazarika
- Dhruba Hazarika
- Mafizuddin Ahmed Hazarika
- Tabu Taid
- Banikanta Kakati
- Ananta Kandali
- Madhava Kandali
- Rudra Kandali
- Durgabar Kayastha
- Madhavdev
- Syed Abdul Malik
- Rongbong Terang
- Kaliram Medhi
- Gopala Mishra
- Dimbeswar Neog (1899–1967)
- Nilmani Phookan (1933-)
- Anandaram Dhekial Phukan
- Mitra Phukan
- Arupa Kalita Patangia
- Sarmistha Pritam
- Anuradha Sharma Pujari
- Bishnuprasad Rabha
- Benudhar Rajkhowa
- Jyoti Prasad Rajkhowa
- Khiren Roy
- Bhabendra Nath Saikia
- Sankardev
- Hema Saraswati
- Brajanath Sarma
- Phani Sarma
- Siddhartha Sarma
- Imran Shah
- Arun Sharma
- Benudhar Sharma
- Harivara Vipra

=== Poets ===
- Gopaldeva Bhawanipuria Aata (1551–1611)
- Hem Barua, Member of Parliament; poet and writer
- Azan Faqir, Poet
- Hiren Bhattacharyya, poet
- Haribar Bipra (fl. 14th century)
- Nalinibala Devi, poet
- Ananta Kandali (fl. 16th century)
- Madhav Kandali (fl. 14th century)
- Madhavdev (1489–1596)
- Sankardev (1449–1568)
- Hem Saraswati (fl. 14th century)
- Jayadhwaj Singha (died 1663), Ahom King, poet
- Rudra Singha, Ahom King, poet

== Historical figures ==
- Kanaklata Baruah
- Kumārila Bhaṭṭa
- Badan Chandra Borphukan
- Lachit Borphukan
- Chilarai
- Maniram Dewan
- Bagh Hazarika
- Kushal Konwar
- Joymoti Konwari
- Tarun Ram Phukan
- Sati Sadhani
- Kumar Bhaskara Varman
- Bhimbor Deori

== Politicians ==
- Fakhruddin Ali Ahmed, fifth President of India
- Badruddin Ajmal, President of All India United Democratic Front
- Atul Bora, Cabinet Minister; A Member of the Assam Legislative Assembly from the regional party Asom Gana Parishad.
- Abdul Matlib Mazumder, He was one among the prominent muslim MLA and also Cabinet Minister of Assam.As a Muslim leaders of eastern India, he also support Hindu-Muslim unity, opposing the partition of India on communal lines. Mazumdar along with Fakhruddin Ali Ahmed (who later became the 5th President of India) became the most prominent Muslim opponents of the demand for a separate Muslim state of Pakistan, especially in the eastern part of the country.
- Pramod Boro, former CEM of BTC; president of UPPL
- Siva Prasad Barooah, politician, tea planter, philanthropist, and humanist
- Debakanta Barua, former president of Indian National Congress.
- Gopinath Bordoloi, first Chief Minister of independent Assam; freedom fighter; only Assamese to date who has been conferred the civil honour of Bharat Ratna by the Indian Government.
- Upendranath Brahma, Bodo-Fa, the father of Bodoland
- Sansuma Khunggur Bwiswmuthiary, Bodo nationalist
- Bimala Prasad Chaliha, former Chief Minister of Assam
- Mahendra Mohan Choudhury, former Chief Minister of Assam; former Governor of Punjab
- Tarun Gogoi, former Chief Minister of Assam
- Bijoy Krishna Handique, former Union Minister of state
- Bhabesh Kalita, State President BJP Assam Pradesh
- Jogendra Nath Hazarika, former Chief Minister of Assam
- Prafulla Kumar Mahanta, former Chief Minister of Assam
- Bishnuram Medhi, former Chief Minister of Assam; former Governor of Madras State; first Assamese governor
- Santosh Mohan Dev, former Union Minister
- Hagrama Mohilary, ex-BLTF chief, former CEM of BTC
- Ranjit Shekhar Mooshahary, former Governor of Meghalaya
- Ajanta Neog, Minister of Finance in Govt of Assam; first woman Finance Minister of Assam; Member of the Assam Legislative Assembly from Bharatiya Janata Party.
- Kabindra Purkayastha, former Union Minister
- Syed Muhammed Saadulah, first Chief Minister of Assam under British colonial, He was also the member of Constituent Assembly of India from 1946 to 1950.
- Hiteswar Saikia, former Chief Minister of Assam, 6th Lieutenant Governor of Mizoram
- Himanta Biswa Sarma, current Chief Minister of Assam & Convener of the Election Management Committee; Cabinet Minister, Govt. of Assam (2002-2014) (2016-2021)
- Sarat Chandra Sinha, former Chief Minister of Assam
- Sarbananda Sonowal, Former Chief Minister of Assam; former Union Minister
- Syeda Anwara Taimur, first woman Chief Minister of Assam. Only Muslim chief minister of Assam.

== Religious leaders ==
- Kalicharan Brahma
- Rupnath Brahma
- Damodardev
- Ajan Fakir
- Pitambar Deva Goswami
- Madhavdev
- Sankardev

== Sports ==
=== Archer ===
- Jayanta Talukdar

=== Athletes ===
- Tayabun Nisha
- Bhogeswar Baruah, won gold medal at 1966 Asian Games
- Hima Das

=== Badminton player ===
- Dipankar Bhattacharjee, Indian badminton player
- Ashmita Chaliha

=== Boxers ===
- Jamuna Boro
- Shiva Thapa
- Lovlina Borgohain, won a bronze medal at the 2020 Summer Olympics

=== Bodybuilding ===
- Mahadev Deka
- Gautam Kalita

=== Cricketers ===
- Abu Nechim Ahmed, First Assamese IPL player and former Mumbai Indians fast bowler.
- Javed Zaman, He was Assam's first List A Player and greatest fast bowler from Assam [1]
- Gokul Sharma
- Riyan Parag,. plays for Rajasthan Royals in IPL and Indian international cricketer.
- Jogeswar Bhumij, Cricketer

=== Footballers ===
- Debashish Roy, former Indian national footballer
- Gilbertson Sangma, former Indian national footballer
- Babul Phukan, former Indian national footballer
- Jewel Bey, former Indian national footballer
- Anjana Saikia, Indian national woman footballer
- Holicharan Narzary, ISL and Indian national footballer
- Alen Deory, ISL and Indian national footballer
- Durga Boro, former ISL footballer
- Baoringdao Bodo, ISL and Indian national footballer
- Pranjal Bhumij, ISL footballer
- Pragyan Gogoi, ISL footballer
- Vinit Rai, ISL and Indian national footballer
- Gaurav Bora, ISL footballer
- Milan Basumatary
- Toshen Bora, Indian national footballer

=== Gymnast ===
- Binita Chetry, 3rd place on Britain’s Got Talent

=== Tennis player ===
- Somdev Devvarman

=== Table tennis player ===
- Monalisa Baruah Mehta

== Naturalists ==
- Robin Banerjee
- Ananda Chandra Dutta
- Jadav Payeng
- Anwaruddin Choudhury

== Others ==
- Hemendra Prasad Barooah, entrepreneur, tea planter and philanthropist
- Jitendra Nath Goswami, astrophysicist
- Ranjit Barthakur, businessman
- Sailadhar Baruah, film producer
- Suprabha Devi, film producer
- Uddhab Bharali, inventor
- Nomal Chandra Borah, neurologist and founder of GNRC hospitals
- Harishankar Brahma, election commissioner of India
- Ramesh C. Deka, former Director of AIIMS
- Gunaram Khanikar, herbalist
- Achyut Lahkar, father of Assamese mobile theatre
- Tarun Ram Phukan, freedom fighter
- Joyanti Chutia, scientist, one of the only two women to head any scientific institution in India
- Anandita Dutta Tamuly, world record holder
- Nayandeep Deka Baruah, mathematician
- Anupam Saikia, mathematician
- Dhaniram Baruah, heart surgeon, popularly known as India's Pig Heart Doctor

== See also ==
- People from Western Assam
