= List of people from Western Assam =

Modern Western Assam is a culturally distinct region. This list specifically focuses on people from Western Assam.

== Legendary ==
- Naraka, founder, Naraka dynasty
- Bhagadatta, ruler, Naraka dynasty
- Vajradatta, ruler, Naraka dynasty

== Ancient ==
- Pushyavarman, founder, Varman dynasty
- Samudravarman, ruler, Varman dynasty
- Balavarman, ruler, Varman dynasty
- Kalyanavarman, ruler, Varman dynasty
- Ganapativarman, ruler, Varman dynasty
- Mahendravarman, ruler, Varman dynasty
- Narayanavarman, ruler, Varman dynasty
- Bhutivarman, ruler, Varman dynasty
- Chandramukhavarman, ruler, Varman dynasty
- Sthitavarman, ruler, Varman dynasty
- Susthitavarman, ruler, Varman dynasty
- Supratisthitavarman, ruler, Varman dynasty
- Bhaskaravarman, ruler, Varman dynasty
- Avantivarman, ruler, Varman dynasty
- Brahma Pala, founder, Pala dynasty
- Ratna Pala, ruler, Pala dynasty
- Indra Pala, ruler, Pala dynasty
- Go Pala, ruler, Pala dynasty
- Harsha Pala, ruler, Pala dynasty
- Dharma Pala, ruler, Pala dynasty
- Jaya Pala, ruler, Pala dynasty
- Lauhityapada, writer
- Minanatha, writer
- Kumarila Bhatta, Preacher
- Chand Sadagar, Merchant

== Medieval ==
- Ananta Kandali, writer
- Bakul Kayastha, writer
- Bhattadeva, writer
- Bhusana Dvija, writer
- Birdatta Choudhury, revolutionary
- Chandra Bharati, writer
- Damodara Deva, writer
- Durgabar Kayastha, writer
- Kalapachandra Dvija, writer
- Gopalacharana Dwija, writer
- Gopala Mishra, writer
- Haribara Vipra, writer
- Haradatta Choudhury, revolutionary
- Hema Saraswati, writer
- Pitambar Dvija, writer
- Pitambara Sidhanta Vagisa, writer
- Rama Saraswati, writer
- Rudra Kandali, writer
- Sarvabhauma Bhattacharya, writer
- Sridhara Kandali, writer
- Vishnu Bharati, writer

== Modern ==
- Abani Chakravarty, writer
- Adil Hussain, Bollywood actor
- Ambika Charan Choudhury, writer
- Ambikagiri Raichoudhury, freedom fighter
- Axl Hazarika, Composer, musician, lyricist, producer, film-maker
- Banikanta Kakati, linguist
- Bhabananda Deka, writer and recipient of the literary pension and literature grant
- Bhumidhar Barman, thirteenth chief minister of Assam
- Birendra Nath Datta, national award-winning singer
- Bishnu Ram Medhi, second chief minister of Assam
- Bishnu Prasad Rabha, freedom fighter
- Fakhruddin Ali Ahmed, fifth President of India
- Hagrama Mohilary, Chief Executive Member of Bodoland Territorial Council
- Himanta Biswa Sarma, politician
- Indira Goswami, national award-winning author
- Jim Ankan Deka, musician and documentary film maker
- Kaliram Medhi, writer
- Kalpana Patowary, singer
- Mahadev Deka, bodybuilder
- Mahendra Mohan Choudhry, fourth chief minister of Assam
- Parbati Charan Das, Kargil martyr
- Pratima Barua Pandey, national award-winning Goalparia lokageet singer
- Rameshwar Pathak, Kamrupi Lokgeet singer
- Ranjit Shekhar Mooshahary, present Governor of Meghalaya
- Sarat Chandra Sinha, fifth Chief Minister of Assam
- Sarbananda Sonowal, fourteenth Chief Minister of Assam
- Seema Biswas, Bollywood actress
