= List of Assamese-language poets =

This is a List of notable Assamese poets.

== List ==
- Madhav Kandali (fl. 14th century)
- Hem Saraswati (fl. 14th century)
- Haribar Bipra (fl. 14th century)
- Sankardev (1449–1568)
- Madhavdev (1489–1596)
- Ananta Kandali (fl. 16th century)
- Bhattadev
- Sridhar Kandali
- Gopaldeva Bhawanipuria Aata (1551–1611)
- Jayadhwaj Singha (died 1663)
- Rudra Singha (died 1714)
- Kamalakanta Bhattacharya (1853–1936)
- Chadrakumar Agarwala (1867–1938)
- Hem Chandra Goswami (1872–1928)
- Lakshminath Bezbarua (1864–1938)
- Padmanath Gohain Baruah (1871–1946)
- Ananda Chandra Agarwala (1874–1939)
- Benudhar Rajkhowa (1872–1955)
- Kamalakanta Bhattacharya (1853–1936)
- Mafizuddin Ahmed Hazarika (1870–1958)
- Chandradhar Baruah (1874–1961)
- Raghunath Choudhary (1879–1968)
- Nalinibala Devi (1898–1977)
- Nilmoni Phukan (1880-1978)
- Dimbeswar Neog (1899–1966)
- Atul Chandra Hazarika (1903–1986)
- Jyoti Prasad Agarwalla (1903–1951)
- Mahendranath Dekaphukan (1903–1973)
- Parvati Prasad Baruva (1904-1964)
- Hem Barua (1915–1977)
- Nalinidhar Bhattacharya (1920-2016)
- Amulya Barua (1922–1946)
- Mahim Bora (1924-2016)
- Nabakanta Barua (1926–2002)
- Bhabananda Deka (1929–2006)
- Homen Borgohain (1931–2021)
- Hiren Bhattacharya (born 1932)
- Nilamani Phookan (born 1933)
- Hiren Gohain (born 1939)
- Troilokya Bhattacharjya(1939-2013)
- Nalini Prava Deka (1944-2014)
- Harekrishna Deka (born 1948)
- Baldev Mahanta (born 1950)
- Keshab Mahanta(1926-2006)
- Nirmal Prabha Bordoloi(1933-2004)
- Syed Abdul Malik(1919–2000)
- Ganesh Gogoi(1908-1938)
- Sananta Tanty (Born 1952)
- Samir Tati
- Chandra Kumar Agarwala
- Jyoti Prasad Agarwala
- Hafiz Ahmed
- Bijoy Sankar Barman
- Ananda Chandra Barua
- Bhaben Barua
- Binanda Chandra Barua
- D. K. Barooah
- Chandra Bharati
- Kamalakanta Bhattacharya (Assam)
- Hiren Bhattacharyya
- Surya Kumar Bhuyan
- Abani Chakraborty
- Lakshyadhar Choudhury
- Rita Chowdhury
- Mithinga Daimary
- Birendra Nath Datta
- Nalini Bala Devi
- Jatindra Nath Duwara
- Suresh Ranjan Goduka
- Hemchandra Goswami
- Mamoni Raisom Goswami
- Madhava Kandali
- Durgabar Kayastha
- Mitradev Mahanta
- Maheswar Neog
- Nilmani Phookan Jr
- Nilmoni Phukan Sr
- Anuradha Sharma Pujari
- Bishnu Prasad Rabha
- Ambikagiri Raichoudhury
- Hema Saraswati
- Imran Shah (writer)
- Benudhar Sharma
- Kamal Kumar Tanti
- Harivara Vipra
