= Kamrupi culture =

Kamrupi culture refers to the cultural norms of people of colonial Kamrup district.

== Language ==
The colloquial language of Kamrup are the Kamrupi dialects of Assamese.

== Religion ==
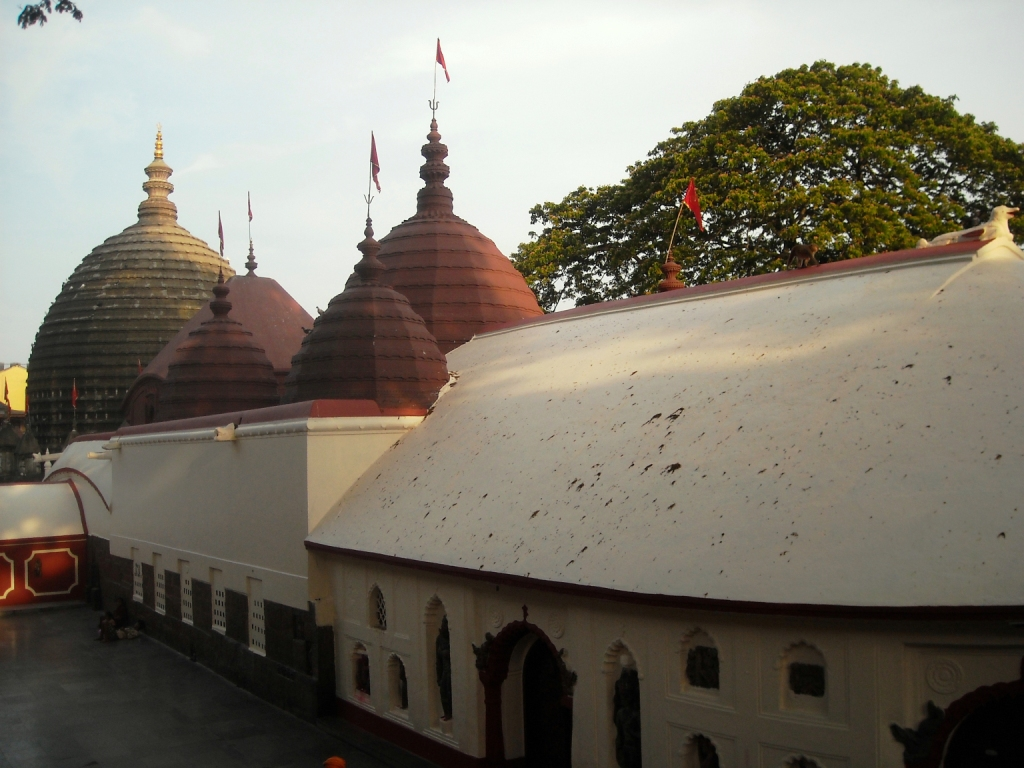
Kamakhya temple, an ancient temple in Kamrup Metropolitan district

Traditionally Hinduism is primary religion practised by Kamrupi people. Cultural development of Kamrup is influenced by Hindu way life, which is evident in day-to-day life. Kamakhya temple is referred to as the heart of Kamrup in different Puranas.

== Literature ==
Kamrupi literature as written form begins as copper plate seals and other inscriptions of Kamrupi kings, as well as Charyapada, a major work in Eastern India. Lauhityapada, Minanatha, Hema Saraswati, Ananta Kandali, Haribara Vipra, Rudra Kandali and Bhattadeva are well known Kamrupi littérateurs.

== Folklore ==
Kamrupi dance are vaishnava forms of dances which are part of Kamrupi folklore.

== Music ==
Kamrupi Lokgeet are traditional folk songs sung from immemorial times, depicting different aspects of life like wedding, lullaby and even for mosquito driveout.

== Festivals ==
The important festivals of Kamrup region are Damhi; Bhathli, a kind of bamboo worship held in mid April, Amati and different Puja's. In winter there is a custom of mosquito drive-out by group singing known as 'Mahoho'. There are also choral songs, known as 'Ojapali', connected with the story of goddess Manasa.

== See also ==
- People from Kamrup
- Guwahati
