= Beauty Sharma Barua =

Indian singer

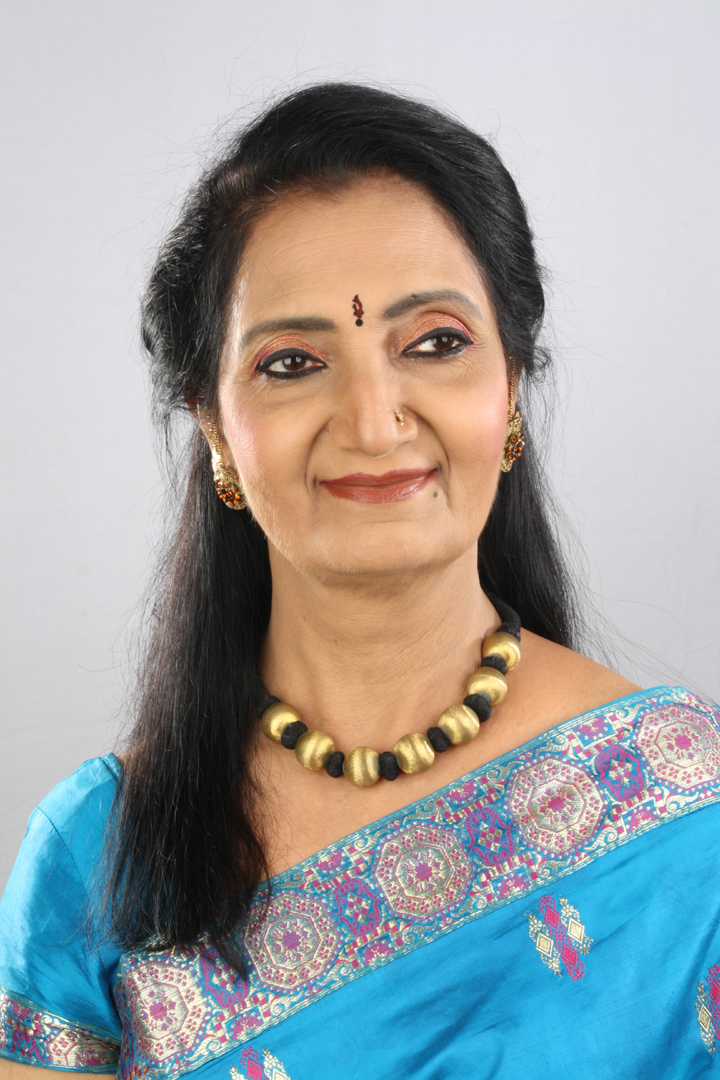
- Beauty Sharma Barua in 2011

Background information
- Also known as: Beauty Baideu
- Born: Beauty Barua; 18 June 1951 (age 75); Dafalating Tea Estate, Golaghat, Assam, Eastern India,
- Origin: Assamese
- Genres: Assamese music Folk music Indian Classical Music Ghazal Bhajan
- Occupation: Singer
- Years active: 1958–present

Beauty Sharma Barua (born 18 June 1951) is a singer from Assam, India. She is one of the best-known and most respected Assamese folk music, Indian classical music, ghazal and bhajan singers of Assam. More popularly known as The Melody Queen of Assam and Beauty Baideu, she has recorded over a thousand songs for All India Radio, Doordarshan, albums and others. She has sung songs in over six regional Indian languages, though primarily in Assamese and Hindi. Beauty Barua married renowned writer and lyricist Dwijendra Mohan Sharma (1948–2006), called the Man with Melody in His Pen by The Daily Telegraph, in 1976.

== Early life ==
Sangeet Prabhakar Beauty Sharma Barua was born in Dafalating Tea Estate, Golaghat, Upper Assam. She was the youngest daughter of Bhubaneshwar Barua and Nirmala Barua, granddaughter of Assamese literary legend, Lakshminath Bezbaroa.

Since the age of 3, Beauty Sharma Barua started learning Sanskrit Shlokas and Assamese devotional songs like Borgeet, Aai Naam and Prarthana geet from her parents. Since the age of 4, she took her first lessons in Indian classical music and light folk music from different gurus from Jorhat. Since the age of 5, she started teaching folk songs to children of tea estate workers at the Dafalating Tea Estate and emerged as a child folk singer at the age of 6. In 1958, when she was 7, she was facilitated by the first prime minister of independent India, Pt. Jawaharlal Nehru for her singing capabilities. Since the age of 9, she was trained in Indian Classical Music by maestros like Rajmohan Das, Tulsi Chakraborty, Anil Dutta, Lakshi Saikia and Pandit Motilal Sharma from the Kirana Gharana, later Indore Gharana. She was also trained in other light classical forms of music like Dadra, Thumri and Kajri by Begum Akhtar and Ghazal by Bal Gautam.

== Singing career ==
=== Early career in the 1960s ===
Since the late 1960s, Beauty Sharma Barua started gaining popularity through her songs aired by All India Radio Guwahati, Shillong, Jorhat and Dibrugarh including special shows on her hosted by All India Radio, Imphal. She soon became a frequent guest in shows and features hosted by various All India Radio stations. Back then, she was more known for her Ghazal, Bhajan and Indian Classical Music. Her first song recorded by All India Radio, Guwahati was Tumaloi Monot Pore, written by Nurul Haque and Music by Jitu Tapan in 1968. This song was later recorded as a duet with Bhupen Hazarika in 1972. Her second ever recorded song by All India Radio was O Rojonigondha in 1968. This song was written Lila Gogoi and composed by Lakhi Saikia. She gained much respect for being one of the few singers who could sing raga based songs in Assam. Some of her most popular songs recorded in the late 1960s included Xouwa Neel Neel (1969) and Mon Dilu Tomak (1969).

=== 1970s ===
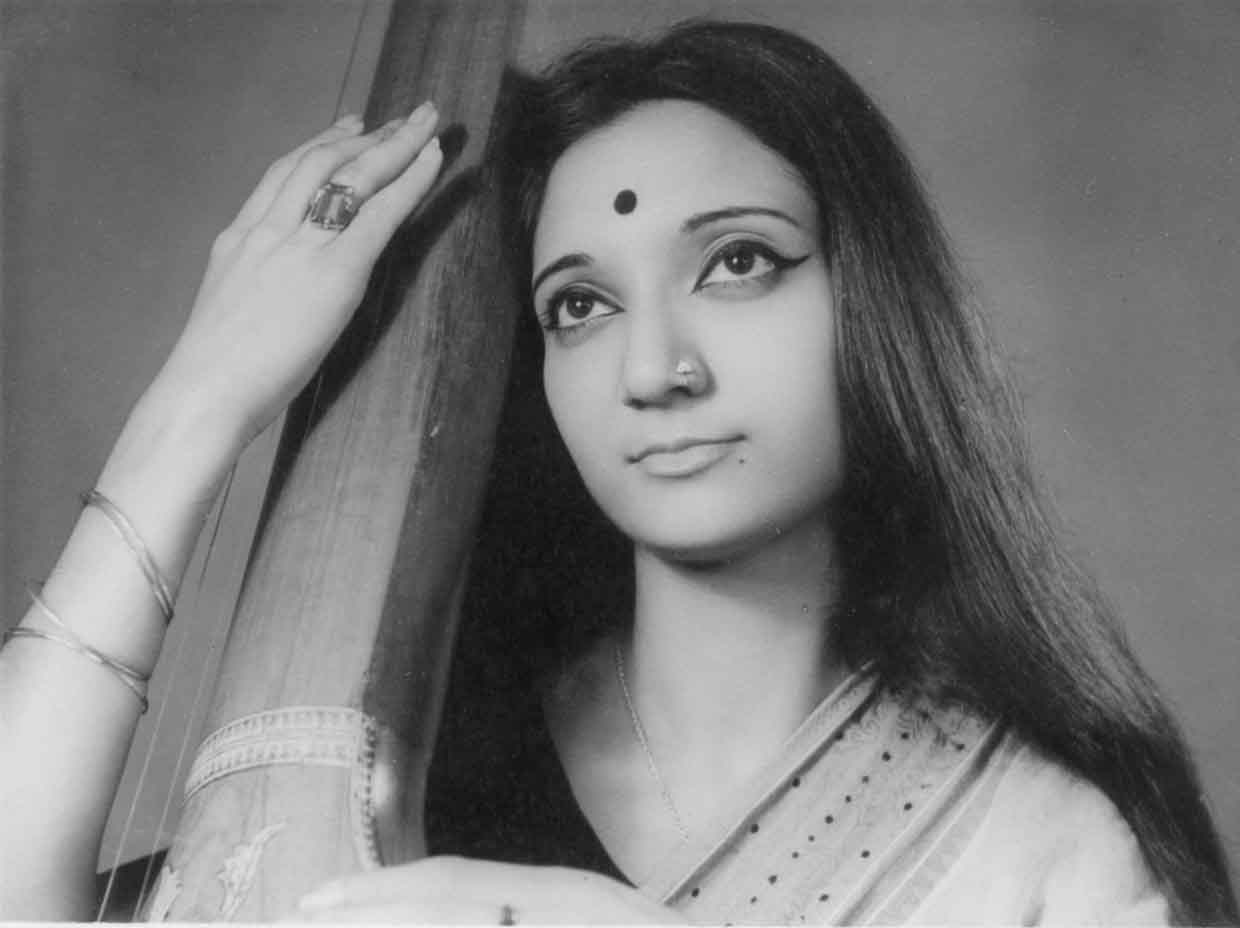
Beauty Sharma Barua as a young woman in 1972

Since the 1970s, Beauty Sharma Barua sang songs for various Music Directors of the time including Bhupen Hazarika, Jayanta Hazarika, Khagen Mahanta, Indreshwar Sarma, Subir Mukherjee, Lakshi Saikia, Jitu Tapan, Dr. Birendra Nath Datta, Mukul Barua, Jiten Deb, Hemen Hazarika, Amiadhar Barua, Anil Barua, Birendra Nath Phukan, Dilip Sarma, Mohammad Hussain, Jagadish Barua, Deben Sarma, Prabhat Sarma, J.P Das, Bipul Barua, Utpal Sarma, Atul Dev Sarma, Ramen Choudhury, Anupam Choudhury, Hiren Gohain and Jyotish Bhattacharya. Her voice was rendered to some of the legendary song writers of Assam, including, Jyoti Prasad Agarwala, Bishnu Prasad Rabha, Laxminath Bezbarua, Parvati Prasad Baruwa, Mitradev Mahanta, Bhupen Hazarika, Nabakanta Barua, Darpanath Sarma, Lila Gogoi, Lakhyahira Das, Keshav Mahanta, Tafajul Ali, Usuf Hazarika, Nurul Haque, Sandhya Devi, Idris Ali, Hiren Bhattacharyya, Amit Sarkar, Anuradha Das, Hemanta Goshwami, Kirti Kamal Bhuyan, Nagen Bora and Mukul Barua. Her gramophone record album with Bhupen Hazarika released by Gramophone Company India in 1972 was a best seller. Duets like Tumaloi Monot Pore and Tumi Joon Ne Xoon with Bhupen Hazarika introduced a new trend of modern folk music in Assam.

Some of her famous songs during the 1970s included Proja Poti Jhilmil Pakhi (1970), Etiya Polom Hol (1970), Chandrawoli Nixa (1971), Un Mona Hoi Mone (1971), Tumi Joon Ne Xoon (1972), Tumaloi Monot Pore (1972), Tumi Xudha (1973), Xorot Ahile Henu (1973), Prothom Torati (1974), Maya Mrigo (1974), Akash Neela (1975), Tumar Kotha Jetiya Bhabu (Later sung by Jayanta Hazarika)(1975), Monore Xima Rekha (1975), He Maya Bini (1975), Gharmua Pokhi (1976), Ei Xapoon Mur (1976), Mah Halodhi (1977), Kokalot Gagori (1977), Xipare Jamuar (1978), Devi Buli Matisilu (1978), Moi Nodit (1979) and Moi Sondo Hara (1979). After her marriage to Poet and Lyricist, Dwijendra Mohan Sharma in 1976, Assam saw another new trend in melody blended between Assamese Folk Music and light Classical. The birth of evergreen compositions like Mah Halodhi, Ghar Mua Pokhi, Xipare Jamunar, Devi Buli Matisilu, Dighal Koi Uroni, Habiye Habiye, Ujoni Mua Rail Gari, Tup Tup Robha Toli and Kokalot Gagori written by Dwijendra Mohan Sharma and sung by Beauty Sharma Barua, are still amongst the most melodious songs loved by people of Assam. Beauty Sharma Barua has sung over 300 songs written by Dwijendra Mohan Sharma since the 1970s till now.

=== 1980s ===
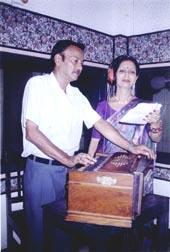
With Dwijendra Mohan Sharma, 1989

The 1980s saw the rise of one of the most respected music schools of Assam, the Alakananda Sangeet Vidyalaya, started by Beauty Sharma Barua. This music school has seen multiple singers emerge into the global scenario through the training imparted by Beauty Sharma Barua. Her disciples were known to be some of the most classically trained singers in the state, especially in genres like Ghazal, Bhajan and Assamese Folk Music. Her students started demonstrating expertise in practically any form of music through the strong base created by the legendary singer. In 1988, the children learning music at the Alakananda Sangeet Vidyalaya won multiple awards for their songs sung in the album, Umola Ghoror Geet, which was directed by Beauty Sharma Barua and composed by Dwijendra Mohan Sharma. The song Seuji Sopot from the album is still used as a theme for the Green Revolution in Assam.

During the 1980s, she sang some of the best light classical based melodious songs of her time which are still amongst her greatest hits today. Her most famous Indian classical based songs include Bonei Bone (1980), Shyam O Shyam (1980), Megh Nathakile (1980), Kiyo Jaanu Mur (1981), Xao Nao Borosaat (1982), Nibe Nimati Rati (1984), Kaar Xure Xure (1986) and Buku Apun Aai (1987) . Some of her most melodious songs of the period are Joon Tora Raati (1981), Dighol Koi Uroni (1981), Tup Tup Robha Toli (1981), Aha Naa Kua Naa (1981), Rati Xaare Ase (1982), Sandhiya Hole(1982), Dori Kona Maas (1983), Besi Din Logot Nathaku (1984), Akajoli Xur (1985), Mon Kiyo Aji (1985), Xorot Xitol (1986), Duronire Pora (1986), Kaali Ratir Xapun (1987), Agoli Kolore Paate (1987), Najau Aji Ghoroloi (1988), Habiye Habiye (1989).

=== 1990s ===
From the 1990s onwards, Beauty Sharma Barua worked with multiple music directors and brought in some of the most popular songs in Assam including Eman Apun Hoiyu (1991), Bota Sorai (1991), Maya Bhora Raati (1991), Dubori Buku (1991), Kun Ropohi Tai (1992), Suruj Mukhiye Kole (1992), Lorajon Xodiye (1993), Ulai Saalu Dekha Paalu (1993), Kauri Kaa Kaa (1994), Misingor Sangote (1994), Nas Bandor Nas (1995), Ja Ja Jiya (1995), Xi Jhune Buto (1996), Ujoni Mua (1996), Bhor Duporia (1997), Deu Di Nasili (1997), Ratite Phuli Utha (1997), Eijora Band Party (1998), Lorajon Sadiye (1998), Dhuliya Bihu Wa Dhulotu (1999), Gaor Manuhe Koi Bhute Dhorise (1999), Ei Je Abile Bela (1999) among others.

In 1999, her album Nao Koina brought in a new dimension to marriage songs and was the common background music in Assamese Weddings. Apart her songs in albums like Xorotor Xondiya, Parinita, Upasana, Joan, Atitak Xuori and Shri Shri Durga topped the charts in the state.

=== 2000s ===
After the success of Noa Koina, another marriage album listing her most popular songs, Daponmoti, was released in 2005. During the 2000s she recorded multiple popular songs including Xunali Xunaru Phoolise (2000), Kun Rupohir Gohona Jeelikay (2001), Dug Dug Madolore Maat (2001), Xun Ne Rup Ne (2001), Pooja Pooja Botorote (2002), Jetuka Patere (2002), Jobonor Noi (2003), Sandhya Nami Bokul Bonot (2003), Botahote Haale Jaale (2003), Ajiye Godhuli Bela (2003), Akasot Junakor (2004), Eti Proshno Mur (2004), Klanto Ratir Tora (2004), Rupore Agoni (2004), Xopunor Maya Bhora (2004) and others.

After the death of Dwijendra Mohan Sharma in 2006, which came in as a huge shock to the people of Assam, she was inspired by all eminent musicians in Assam to continue her singing and keep the legend, Dwijendra Mohan Sharma alive. In 2007, she published a book on children’s songs, Umola Ghoror Geet, which contained 56 songs written by Dwijendra Mohan Sharma along with staff notations for the tunes. These songs were sung by children and a popular Assamese children’s album with the same name was released in 2007. The death of Dwijendra Mohan Sharma inspired her to write her first composition as a dedication to the legend released in an album, My Ornate Life With The Legend, in 2008. One of her most popular albums, Moonlight Melodies, was also released in the same year. The music director for the songs in the albums was Ramen Choudhury and Bhupen Uzir.

=== 2010s ===
The 2010s find her travelling across India taking Assamese music across different states. She has sung multiple songs in different Indian languages including Hindi, Marathi, Punjabi and Kannada apart from translating Assamese songs into those languages.

In 2012, her album, Mah Halodhi, has been one of her bestsellers with millions of fans enjoying her most popular numbers.

In 2016, two music albums, Dapunmoti and Jugomiya Geet were released in a function organised in memory of the Assam’s eminent lyricist Nurul Haque at the Rabindra Bhawan, held under the aegis of Assam Sahitya Sabha and the state government’s Directorate of Cultural Affairs.

In 2017, she released Alakananda, an album of 162 songs written by Dwijendra Mohan Sharma, rendered by 75 prominent singers including herself. In the same year, she also released a book in the same name, Alakananda, that includes hundreds of songs, poems and compositions by Dwijendra Mohan Sharma.

In 2018, Beauty Sharma Barua released her first spiritual album, Shakti - Stotras & Vandanas for Peace and Inner Strength, which include multiple vedic semi-classical renderations including Shiva Stotra, Durga Stotra, Kamakhya Stotra, Dirgheshwari Mantra, Kali Mantra, Saraswati Vandana and Durga Stuti among others. 2018 also saw the release of her semi-classical album, Thumri - Kajri - Dadra - Beauty Sharma Barua, which included Najariya Laage Nahi (Thumri), Saiyan Rooth Gaye (Kajri), Mor Balamwa Pardesiya (Dadra), Nahi Aaye More Shyaam (Thumri), Sawariya Ne Haye Ram (Dadra) and Sawan Ki Ritu (Kajri).

=== 2020s ===
In 2021, she was awarded the Shilpi Sanman by the Directorate of Cultural Affairs, Government of Assam under the aegis of the Chief Minister of Assam, Himanta Biswa Sarma.

In September, 2022, the Jeewan Ram Mungi Devi Goenka Public Charitable Trust (JRMDGPCT) honoured their Lifetime Achievement Award to Beauty Sharma Barua along with sound designer Jatin Sarma, Mumbai-based choreographer Kamal Nath, and the National Award winner was Padma Shri Yeshe Dorjee Thongchi from Arunachal Pradesh.

In 2023, she has recorded a new string of Hindi songs inspired by her old Assamese melodies that include songs like Tum Yaad Aaye Mujhe and Dil Diya Hai Tumhe.

As per the official state portal of the Government of Assam, Beauty Sharma Barua is one of the artists who has laid the foundation of the Assamese music industry with a confluence of indigenous folk music along with other legends like Jyoti Prasad Agarwala, Bishnuprasad Rabha, Parvati Prasad Baruva, Bhupen Hazarika, Nirmalendu Choudhury, Pratima Barua Pandey, Luit Konwar Rudra Baruah, Parvati Prasad Baruva, Jayanta Hazarika and Khagen Mahanta.

== Non-singing career ==
Apart from her singing, she directed multiple musical shows on Doordarshan and All India Radio on various themes and various eminent singers from Assam took part in those television shows. She also had a few acting stints in Protichobi, Dapon and Pratighat, and rendering her voice in Atma Mariyada, a popular Assamese soap.

== See also ==
- Music of Assam
- Barua
