= Gopala Mishra =

Gopalacharana Dwija
- Born: Kamrup region, Assam
- Occupations: Vaishnava poet and scholar
- Writing career
- Language: Early Assamese

Gopala Mishra (born 15th century) was a 16th-century Vaishnava poet and scholar from Kamrup region of Assam. Gopala Mishra was disciple and colleague of Damodara Deva.

== See also ==
- Hema Saraswati
- Bhusana Dvija
