= Rama Saraswati =

Indian 16th century poet

- Writing career
- Language: Early Assamese
- Notable works: Assamese translation of Sanskrit Mahabharata, Gita Govinda, Vadha Kavyas

Rama Saraswati was 16th century poet from Kamrup, India. He was well known for translation of entire Mahabharata to Early Assamese from Sanskrit for which he is also known as Axom Byas.

== See also ==
- Bhattadeva
- Hema Saraswati
