= Pitambar Dvija =

- Born: 1455; Lower Assam
- Died: 1533 (aged 77–78)
- Occupation: Vaisnavite poet
- Writing career
- Language: Goalpariya
- Notable work: Usha Parinaya

Pitambar Dvija (1455–1533) was 15 and 16th century litterateur from Lower Assam and contemporary of likes of Haribara Vipra and Hema Saraswati.

== Works ==
Usha-Parinaya was written in 1533 AD by Pitambar Dvija which was an Kamrupi rendering of the Usha-Anuradha episode from Vishnu Purana. He composed verses on Rukmini Haran.

== See also ==
- Ananta Kandali
- Bhusana Dvija
- Madhav Kandali
