= Forum for Sankaradeva Studies =

The Forum for Sankaradeva Studies (Assamese: Sankaradeva Adhyayan Kendra) is a research-oriented institution dedicated to promoting the message and the ideals of Srimanta Sankaradeva, one of the leading lights of the Vaishnavite tradition in India. It is based at Guwahati in the Indian state of Assam, and operates out of its offices located at Keteki Path, Saurabh Nagar, in the Beltola precinct of Guwahati.

== Inauguration ==
The Forum was formally inaugurated in the year 1988, under the presidency of the eminent scholar Dr. Maheswar Neog. It has succeeded in producing a steady stream of fine scholarly output since then. The incumbent General Secretary of the Forum is Dr. Pradip Jyoti Mahanta of the department of Assamese, University of Guwahati.

== Forum ==
The aims and objects of the Forum are:

- to establish a centre for research on the diverse contributions of Sankaradeva and their abiding values;
- to organize and hold lectures, seminars, exhibitions of art, demonstrations of music, dance and drama;
- to encourage and focus standard performances and other products of various art forms of the Sankaradeva tradition;
- to establish a centre for performing and other art forms;
- to establish a reference library particularly equipped with a manuscript section and also a museum of art objects;
- to bring out bulletins, journals and other publications from time to time;
- to organize extension programmes, etc. in different places for the furtherance of the ideals of Sankaradeva.

Thus, The Forum is committed to providing institutional support for research-workers, students, scholars and other sections of the public who are engaged in Sankaradeva studies, as also to creating an atmosphere which conduces, in broad social terms, to the success of such efforts.
