= The Northeast Times =

The Northeast Times may refer to:

- The North East Times, an English daily published from Northeast India.
- Northeast Times, an American newspaper.
