= Kalapachandra Dvija =

Litterateur

- Born: Kamrup
- Occupation: Poet
- Writing career
- Language: Kamrupi
- Notable work: Ramayana Chandrika

Kalapachandra Dvija was medieval litterateur from Kamrup "Ramayana Chandrika" was one of his notable work.

== See also ==
- Vishnu Bharati
- Sarvabhauma Bhattacharya
