= Gauri Shankar Kalita =

Indian journalist

- Born: 1955; Sarupathar, Assam
- Died: 9 June 2010 (aged 54–55); Guwahati, Assam
- Education: Graduated at the Cotton College, Guwahati
- Occupations: Journalist; Newspaper Editor
- Spouse: Garima Kalita

Gauri Shankar Kalita (1955 - 9 June 2010 ) was an Indian journalist.

Kalita was one of the popular journalists in the north-eastern state of Assam. He graduated from the Cotton College of Guwahati.

In his youth he studied Marxism and in 1978 was the only Indian representative at the International Youth Conference in Ulaanbaatar, with his speech broadcast on Soviet television.

An expert on Assam, and of north-east Indian problems, his mother tongue was Assamese though he had a deep knowledge of English. Kalita worked for one of the main daily newspapers of the north-eastern region, The Sentinel, where he started his career, and was the editor of the Arunachal Pradesh and Meghalaya editions. He also was the Editor of The North East Times and of the main Assamese-language newspaper Janasadharan.

He died in Guwahati on 9 June 2010 after a cardiac arrest.

Tarun Gogoi, the Chief Minister of Assam, said that "Kalita had an in-depth knowledge and understanding of the problems plaguing the State and the region and created public opinion through his writings. The void created by his death will be hard to fill".

His wife, Garima Kalita, is a retired Head of The Department of Philosophy of Udalguri College, Assam, and is currently settled at Guwahati
