= Gopalacharana Dwija =

- Born: c. 1500; Kamrup
- Occupations: Vaishnava poet and scholar
- Writing career
- Language: Assamese (Kamrupi dialects)

Gopalacharana Dwija (B. 1500s) was sixteenth century Vaishnava poet and scholar from Kamrup. Gopalacharana Dwija was follower of Damodara Deva.

== Works ==
Gopalacharana Dwija rendered Harivamsa, Bhagavata Purana book III which is done on request from Vaishnavas from Vaikunthapura Sattra, and book VIII into verse and Bhaktiratnakara into prose. He also rendedred into verses Graho Gajendrapakhyana of Bhagavata Purana book III

== Nature of work ==
He translated Bhagavatapurana Book III with assistance of Shridhar Swami's commentary. Book III begins with a description of Sri Krishna's early life. It describes besides cosmogonical matters, the meeting of Maitreya and Vidura and the former's religious instructions to the latter, the story of the Boar incarnation of Vishnu, Kapila's birth and his expositions of the Samkhya doctrineto his mother Devahuti. Gopalacharana's profound scholarship is best suited for translating the most abstruse and philosophical chapters of Book III. In Graho Gajendrapakhyana of Bhagavata Purana book III besides translating the first four chapters containing the accounts of 'four manvantaras' and the fight between the Graha (the alligator) and the Gajendra (the king of elephants) and their ultimate emancipation. also gives a rapid survey of the contents of the next ten chapters, viz. the 'Amritamanthana' episode and finally concludes with an account of different Manus narrated in the fourteenth chapter. There is also a reference to Shridhar Swami at places. His Harivamsha is a mixture of Bhagavatapurana, Harivamsha and Vishnupurana, the subject-matter of the book being the killing of Narakasura and the taking away of the Parijata tree by Sri Krishna from Indra for presenting it to his beloved wife Satyabhama. In the colophon of the book Gopalacharana introduced himself as the disciple of Gopala Mishra. who in his turn was a disciple and colleague of Damodaradeva. He also refers to Baladeva, another close associate of Damodaradeva who succeeded the latter in the Vaikunthapura Satra. Gopalacharana rendered Bhaktiratnakara which gives a synopsis of Vaishnavism, i.e. the religion of love and devotion. Gopolacharana's translation is elegant and simple.

== Institutions ==
He owns a 'Tol' (Sanskrit Pathshala (School)) at Baranagar in Kamrup. Distinguished scholars from different parts of country frequent the institution.

== See also ==
- Vishnu Bharati
- Bhusana Dvija
