= Sarat Chandra Goswami =

Indian Assamese writer (1887-1944)

- Born: 12 May 1887; Nalbari district, Assam
- Died: 19 December 1944 (aged 57)
- Writing career
- Pen name: Bapchandra Bhagawati
- Language: Assamese

Sarat Chandra Goswami (1887-1944) was a prominent writer of Assam who enriched the Assamese literature with his short stories. Goswami was a founder member of Asam Sahitya Sabha and elected as a Secretary of the Sabha for the first time. He continued in the same post from 1920 to 1927.

== Early life and education ==
Goswami was born on 12 May 1887 at Narayanpur Sattra (now Nalbari Sattra) in Nalbari district of Assam. His father Lalit Chandra Goswami was also a writer and known for his "Keli Rohoishyo" book.

He had his early education in his own residence under Matiram Das, a private teacher and was finally admitted in a M.V. School in 1897. Thereafter he was admitted to Cotton Collegiate School and then in Cotton college, Guwahati. He took his F.A. and B.A. degrees from the Calcutta Metropolitan College (now Vidyasagar College). After completion of B.A. he took admission in Calcutta University in M.A. classes having honours in Sanskrit language.

== Career ==
In 1909, he was appointed temporarily as a Deputy Inspector at Nagaon. After that he served in some posts like Assistant Inspector, Superintendent, Inspector etc. in different places of Assam under the education department of Assam.

== Literary works ==
Some of Goswami's literary works include:

Name of Book	Assamese Name	Year of Publication	Literature type	Notes
* Golpanjoli	গল্পাঞ্জলি	1914	Short story book	-
* Moina	ময়না	1920	Short story book	-
* Bajikor	বাজিকৰ	1930	Short story book	-
* Poridorshon	পৰিদৰ্শন	1956	Short story book	Published after his death
* Golpomala	গল্পমালা	1987	Short story book	Published after his death
* Panipath	পানিপথ	1930	Novel	-
* Oxomiya Sadhukotha	অসমীয়া সাধুকথা	1929	A collection of folk-tales	-
* Pericles	পেৰিক্লিচ্	1925	-	-
* Pariksha	পৰীক্ষা	1908	Assamese play	-
* Mahatmā Gandhira jiwana kahini	মহাত্মা গান্ধীৰ জীৱন কাহিনী	1969	Biography	-
* Banariya Pranaya	বনৰীয়া প্ৰণয়	-	-	-
* Nadrama	নড্ৰাম	-	-	-

== See also ==
- Assamese literature
- List of Asam Sahitya Sabha presidents
- List of people from Assam
- List of Assamese-language poets
- List of Assamese writers with their pen names
