= Chandra Bharati =

- Born: c. 1525; Barpeta
- Died: 1578 (aged 52–53)
- Occupation: Poet
- Relatives: Bhattadeva (Son)
- Writing career
- Language: Assamese language

Chandra Bharati (c. 1525 – 1578) was a 16th-century poet, litterateur and proficient of Sanskrit grammar from Barpeta, Kamrup. The inscription on a stone slab on the hill in Rajaduar, abutting on the Brahmaputra, claims that the hill was the abode of Chandra Bharati.

== Family ==
His wife's name was Tara Devi. Their son Bhattadeva was known as "father of Assamese prose".

== See also ==
- Bakul Kayastha
- Bhusana Dvija
