= Sridhar Kandali =

Sridhara Kandali
- Born: Kamrup region, Assam
- Occupation: Poet
- Writing career
- Language: Early Assamese
- Notable work: Kumara Harana

Sridhara Kandali was medieval vaishnavite poet from Kamrup region of Assam. He was known for his poetry work named "Kumara Harana".

== See also ==
- Vishnu Bharati
- Sarvabhauma Bhattacharya
