= Durgabar Kayastha =

Literateur from Kamakhya, Kamrup (1515–1560)

- Born: 1515; Kamakhya, Kamrup
- Died: 1560 (aged 44–45)
- Occupation: Poet
- Writing career
- Language: Assamese
- Notable work: Behula Upakhyana

Durgabar Kayastha (1515–1560), sometimes spelled Durgavar or Durgavara Kayastha, was a poet and Ojapali performer from Kamakhya, Kamrup. He was well-known for his poetry praising the snake goddess Manasa as well as being an expert oja, the lead vocalist in Ojapali. Bengali critics claim that his works are also part of Bengali culture, since the Koch kings of Cooch Behar were major patrons of Assamese poets during the Middle Ages. Durgabar's patron was Biswa Singha, king of the Koch dynasty and a proponent of Shaktism.

His major works include Behula Upakhyana, narrating the story of Behula and Chand Sadagar. This story draws from ballads that were popular in Western Assam and North Bengal long before the verses were reduced to writing by Sukavi Narayan in the thirteenth century and by Durgabar in the early sixteenth century. The songs by Durgabar are known as Durgabari. In his work Giti Ramayana, Durgabar translated Madhava Kandali's Ramayana into lyrics and made new verses of his own, totaling fifty-eight; these songs were set to several classical ragas. One of his songs, O he bhāi lakhāi, describes the sorrows of Rama in the absence of his consort Sita. This song is characterised by its absolute minor pentatonic scale. This is a common feature in Biyāh-gowā Ojapali music not designed to be sung to a raga melody. Modern scholars assume that this melodic pattern is used to adapt poetic texts that were never treated musically, or as a method to maintain folk lyrics after the original tune is lost. Durgabar's Manasa poems, also known as Padmā Purāṇ, were fervently sung by Muslim ojas. In his poems he tenuously associates the god Dharmathakur with the tortoise god Kurma, whereas Mankar, another contemporaneous Manasa poet, related him with Shiva.

He was among the most influential figures in the evolution of panchali literature, which developed in Assam in the late 15th and early 16th centuries. His songs lack signs of later revisions influenced by Sankardev's neo-Vaishnavism and mostly preserve pre-Vaishnavite poetry.

His songs are sung rarely in Biyāh-gowā Ojapali performances in the modern day. Durgabar's Padmā Purāṇ songs are performed at the Devadhani festival, a Devadasi dance ceremony held at Kamakhya Temple on the first and second days of the month of Bhadrapada.

== See also ==
- Bakul Kayastha
- Bhusana Dvija

== Sources ==
- Baral, Kailash C., ed. (2023). Cultural Forms and Practices in Northeast India. People, Cultures and Societies: Exploring and Documenting Diversities. Springer Singapore. pp. 1–233. doi:10.1007/978-981-19-9292-6. ISBN 978-981-19-9292-6. ISSN 2662-6624.
  - Sarma, Dhurjjati. "Plural Embodiments: The Performative World of Sankari Vaishnavism in Assam". In Baral (2023), pp. 13–26.
  - Bhowmick, Dhira. "Ojapali: The Sacred and the Secular in Assamese Folk Performance Culture". In Baral (2023), pp. 39–55.
  - Majumder, Sib Sankar. "From Sacred to Popular: Demystifying Ojha-Nach of Barak Valley". In Baral (2023), pp. 57–67.
  - Barman, Preetinicha. "Kushan Gaan: Retelling of the Ramayana". In Baral (2023), pp. 85–97.
- Barua, K.L. (1933). Early History of Kāmarupa: From the Earliest Times to the End of the Sixteenth Century. Shillong: Don Botco Industrial School Press. pp. 1–342 – via archive.org.
- Bhargava, Gopal, ed. (2003). Encyclopaedia of Art and Culture in India (Assam). Vol. 22. Delhi: Isha Books. pp. 1–419 – via archive.org.
- Das, L. (2023). "Gīts of Biyāh-Gowā Ojāpāli: Content, Contexts and Characteristics". Gīts of Biyāh-gowā Ojāpāli: An Expository Study (PDF) (PhD thesis). Tezpur University. pp. 74–181.
- Misra, Tilottoma (2011). "The Emergence of the Modern Subject in Oriya and Assamese Literatures: Fakir Mohan Senapati and Hemchandra Barua". In Mohanty, S.P. (ed.). Colonialism, Modernity, and Literature. New York City: Palgrave Macmillan. pp. 113–133. doi:10.1057/9780230118348_5. ISBN 978-0-230-11834-8.
- Neog, Dimbeswar (1962). New Light on History of Asamīyā Literature (From the Earliest Until Recent Times) Including an Account of Its Antecendents. Dispur: Xuwani Prakas. pp. 1–464 – via archive.org.
- Neog, Maheswar (1953). "The Worship of Dharma in Assam". Journal of the Asiatic Society Letters. 17 (3): 219–224 – via archive.org.
