= Moghai Ojah =

- Born: 15 March 1916; Naosolia Gaon, Jorhat, Assam
- Died: 15 March 1978; Jorhat, Assam
- Other name: Moghai Baruah

Moghai Ojah or Moghai Baruah (মঘাই ওজা) (1916–1978) was a musician from Assam who popularized the Dhol of Assam to the world audience. Moghai Ojah had also acted in a few films, which include Pioli Phukan, Ranga Police, Pratidhwani, Mahut Bandhu Re (Bengali) and Maram Trishna.

Ojah was born in Naosolia Gaon, Jorhat, Assam and died in Jorhat, Assam on 15 March 1978.

During his childhood, due to poverty, he had to work for some time in a Tea Estate at Chenijan to earn his livelihood.

Srijanasom Trust, a charitable institution set up to promote Indian art and culture, has instituted an award titled “Moghai Ojah Srijan Award” in memory of Moghai Ojah in 2015. The first recipient of the award was prominent Sattriya dance exponent Padmashri Jatin Goswami.
