= Anjana Saikia =

Indian footballer

Personal information
- Date of birth: 18 November 1993 (age 32)
- Place of birth: Garudharia, Assam, India
- Position: Goalkeeper

Team information
- Current team: Gokulam Kerala

Senior career*
Years	Team	Apps	(Gls)
- Moran Town Club
- Assam
- Gokulam Kerala

International career
2014	India	1	(0)
- * Club domestic league appearances and goals

Anjana Saikia (born 18 November 1993) is an Indian professional footballer who plays as a goalkeeper for Gokulam Kerala FC. She has been a member of the India women's national team.

== Honours ==
India

- SAFF Women's Championship: 2014

Gokulam Kerala

- Indian Women's League: 2019–20
