= Sarmistha Pritam =

Indian author from Assam (born 1987)

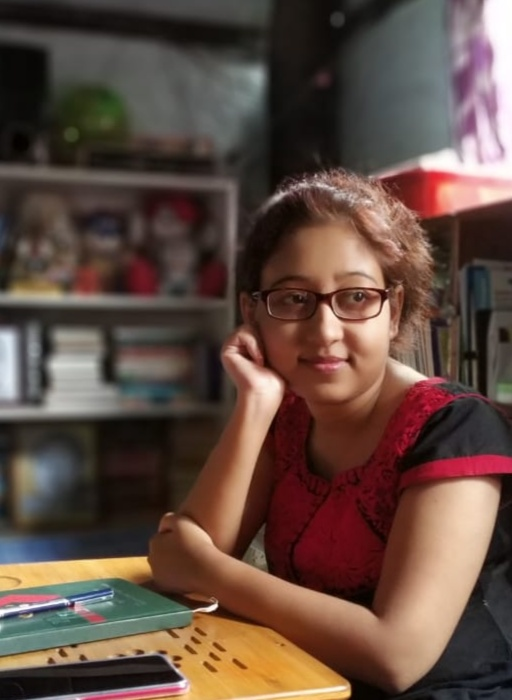
- Born: 18 December 1987 (age 38); Phulaguri, Nagaon, Assam
- Occupation: Assamese writer
- Writing career
- Notable work: Atmakatha (autobiography)

Sarmistha Pritam (born 18 December 1987) is an Assamese writer. She is also an advocate for people with spinal muscular atrophy.

== Early life and education ==
Sarmistha Pritam was born on 18 December 1987 in Phulaguri, Nagaon, Assam. At age five, she was diagnosed with spinal muscular atrophy, which by the age of eight caused significant physical impairments.

She studied economics and graduated with good academic marks. She started her schooling at Phulaguri L.P. school and later joined Phulaguri High School. She passed her higher secondary education from Raha High School and Higher Studies from Raha College.

== Literary career ==
She started her career as daily writer of various Assamese magazine and newspapers. By 2013, she had published a collection of articles, Daworiya Akaxor Beli (The sun in a gloomy sky), a collection of poems, Dokmokali (Daybreak), and an autobiography titled Atmakatha. Her fourth book was written for children, titled Aalphulor Xopun (Aalphul's dream).

In 2015, she wrote to Prime Minister Narendra Modi for help with obtaining her royalties from the National Book Trust for the English and Hindi versions of her autobiography. By 2021, she had also written Anatahin, Rang, Balukat Biyoli Bela and Poran Nigore.

In 2021, filmmaker Bobby Sarma Baruah announced that her next film, Deoka (Walking in the Air), is based on the life of Pritam.

== Advocacy ==
Pritam is a member of Ellora Vigyan Mancha, an NGO that promotes science. In 2021, she advocated for people with spinal muscular atrophy and urged assistance from the government for the costs of treatment.

== Works ==
- Atmakatha (autobiography)
- Aalfulor xopun (children novel)
- Antaheen (a biographical sketch on life and works of motivational speaker Nick Vujicic)
- Sun on my face (English translation of the autobiography written in Assamese, translated by Prafulla Katoky. Published by National Book Trust)
- Mera jiwon meri kahani (Hindi translation of Atmakatha by Gajendra Rathi. Published by NBT)
- Rang (novel)
- Balukat Biyali Bela (novel)

== Awards ==
- 2012: Munin Borkataki Award, for Atmakatha
- 2015: State government literary award
- Gitanjali Baruah Mili Literary award, 2017
- Devsons special Literary award, 2017
- 2017: K.K.Handiqui National Fellowship
- Homan Bargohani Bata Literary award, for Rang
