= Babul Phukan =

Indian footballer (1968–2013)

Personal information
- Full name: Babul Phukan
- Date of birth: 1 May 1968
- Place of birth: Chakalibhoria, Tinsukia, Assam, India
- Date of death: 14 December 2013 (aged 45)
- Place of death: Guwahati, Assam, India
- Position: Right-back

Senior career*
Years	Team	Apps	(Gls)
1985–1988	Maharana Athletic Club	?	(?)
1989	Mohammedan	?	(?)
1990–?	Gauhati Town Club		
1994–1998	Maharana Athletic Club		

International career
1985	India U23		
1985–?	India		
- * Club domestic league appearances and goals

Babul Phukan (1 May 1968 – 14 December 2013) was an Indian footballer from Assam.

== Playing career ==
=== Early career ===
Born at Chakalibhoria village near Panitola in Tinsukia district of Assam, Phukan came from a football family. His elder brothers Reboti Phukan, Sada Phukan and Rudra Phukan all played football at the state level. In 1982, he started his junior career by representing Assam State Sub Junior team. In that year Assam was the runners-up in the National Sub Junior Football tournament. After his good performances, he was selected for the Assam Junior team in 1984. He represented Assam football team nine times in the Santosh Trophy. He was the captain of Assam state team in 1989 and 1990.

=== Club career ===
Phukan played for Maharana Athletic Club, one of the oldest club in North-East from 1985 to 1988. In 1989, he played for Mohammedan Sporting Club in Calcutta for one season. In 1990, he joined the Gauhati Town Club. In 1994, Phukan back to his old club Maharana Athletic Club and played there from 1994 to 1998.

=== International career ===
In 1985, he represented the India U23 team against Italy in Delhi and Lucknow. In the same year he was selected in senior India national football team and made his International debut for India national football team in Nepal. In 1985–86, he was again picked for the Indian junior team for the matches which played in Pakistan and Riyadh. In 1988, he played for the SAI team against a Russian team in Guwahati and Shillong. He put up brilliant performances in those matches.

In 2000, he retired from professional football.

== Death ==
Phukan who was also an SBI Officer died on 14 December 2013 in a private hospital in Guwahati. He had long been suffering from a liver-related disease. Former CM of Assam Tarun Gogoi quoted him as, "Phukan with his stylish footwork techniques and sportsmanship would remain an example for the new generation of footballers".
