= Brajanath Sarma =

- Born: 15 September 1894; Silagaon, Bajali, Undivided Kamrup district (now Barpeta district), Assam, India
- Died: 12 September 1960 (aged 65); Guwahati, Assam, India
- Citizenship: India
- Spouse: Gunawati Devi
- Writing career
- Language: Kamrupi, Assamese
- Literary movement: Indian independence movement

Brajanath Sarma (15 September 1894 – 1960) was a playwright, actor and a pioneer of mobile theater of Assam, India.

== Early life ==
Brajanath Sarma, also called Natyacharjya (a guru of dramatics) was born in the village Sila in the Bajali area of modern Barpeta district of Assam. His father was Padmanath Sarma and mother was Nareswari Devi. After clearing his entrance examination he enrolled for higher studies in the Tarinipriya Chatuspathy of Gouripur, Assam. But he left the studies and came back home. He joined the British Army and fought battles in Baghdad and in other places in overseas in the First World War.

== Career ==
During the period he met an Englishman named George and became interested in acting. While being posted in Basorah, he was an active member of the West Bengali Democratic Club and played roles in various Bengali Dramas from 1917 to 1921.

In 1921, he returned home and forms a 'jatra party' (drama group) in his village bearing the name - 'Sila Kalika Opera Party' with association of his brothers Krishnakanta and Uday Sarma. The drama group was dismantled in 1924 and he formed a new group called 'Sarbhog Dakhin Ganakgari Party' where he directed various plays Dhatri panna, Basapati, Shanti, Kalaphad, Ranjit Singh etc. He trained many young actors like Chandra Choudhury of Barpeta and Phani Sarma of Tezpur. Five years later, in 1930, he formed his historic Kohinoor Opera party.

He was the pioneer of co-acting in the Assamese theater. His was also the first party to tour and perform dramas in various places like 'Bengali Jatra' in Assam. The same movement later translated into the now famous 'Mobile Theaters of Assam'.

In 1936, he discontinued Kohinoor Opera Party and joined the Indian independence movement. He was the Vice-President of Barnagar Congress Committee. During the period of Quit India Movement, he and his associates alienated themselves from the non-violence movement and was the architect of destruction of the Barnagar Aerodrome and Sarbhog police station. For the same, he was jailed for three years in 1943. After that jailed period he went into business.

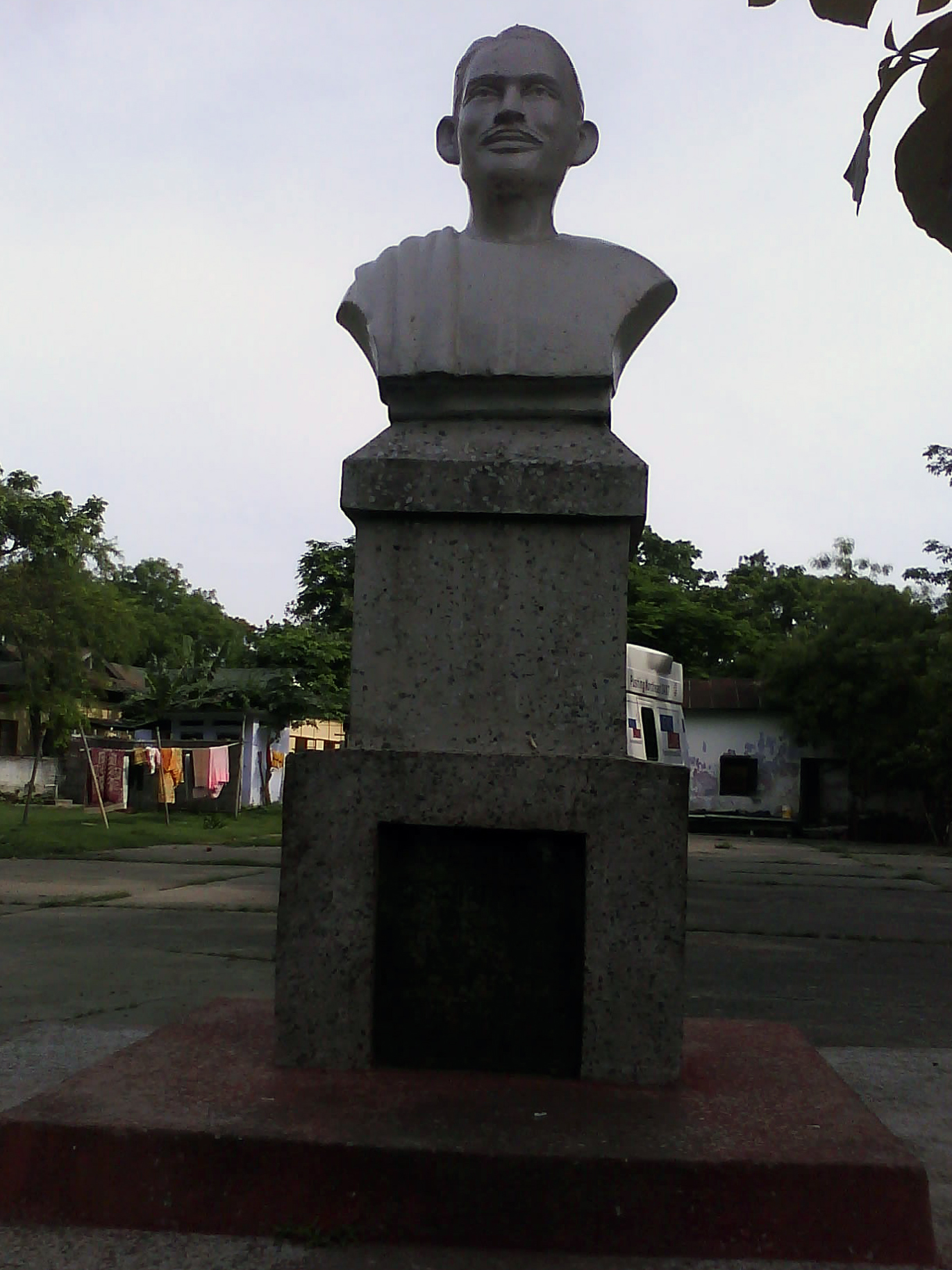
Brajanth Sarma's statue in front of Tezpur Sahitya Sabha Bhawan, Tezpur

Brajasadan, a cultural centre named after Brajanath Sarma, in Sorbhog

Following the independence of India, he joined Socialist Party and severed his ties with Congress. He contested election from the Socialist party in 1952 and lost.

In the later years of his life, he came back to dramas.

== Death ==
He died of respiratory disease in Guwahati in 1960.

== Works ==
=== Plays ===
- Dhatri Panna
- Basaspati
- Shanti
- Kalapahad
- Ranjit Singh
- Barjita
- Manomati
- Patita
- Karuna
- Urbashi

=== Autobiographical ===
- Biplobi

== Bibliography ==
- Sivnath Barman (1992). Axomiya Jeebanee Avidhan; (Assamese Biographical Dictionary). Sophia Press and Publishers Pvt. Ltd.
- Dhīrena Śarmā (1990). Baidyanath Śarmā. Kamalā Prakāśanī.
- Namrata Pathak (2015). Trends in Contemporary Assamese Theatre. Partridge Publishing.
- "Brajanath Sharma remembered". assamtribune.com.
- "A theatre movement". The Assam Tribune. 25 September 2017.
