= Anundoram Borooah =

Indian Sanskrit scholar (1850–1889)

Anandaram Boruah
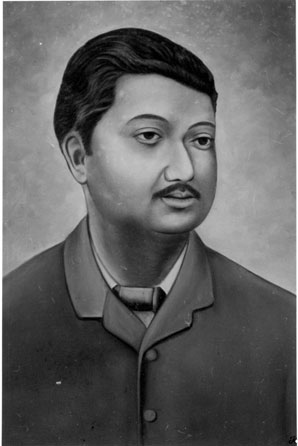
- Anandaram Baruah
- Born: 21 May 1850; Rajaduar, North Guwahati, Assam, India
- Died: 19 January 1889 (aged 38); Calcutta, Bengal Presidency, British India
- Education: Presidency College, calcutta
- Occupations: Lawyer, ICS officer
- Years active: 1864 to 1869
- Known for: First Indian to attain the post of district magistrate in India. First person to qualify for the civil services (I.C.S) from Assam and fifth from India in 1870, First graduate of Assam

Anundoram Borooah (Assamese: আনন্দৰাম বৰুৱা: 1850–1889) was an Indian civil servant, lawyer and scholar of Sanskrit. He was both the first graduate and the first Indian Civil Service officer from the state of Assam. He was the third Indian to attain the post of district magistrate in India (First was Romesh Chandra Dutt).

== Literary works ==
=== Sanskrit classics ===
- Bhavabhuti's Mahavircharitam,
- Saraswatikanthabharana,
- Namalinganusasana,
- Janakiramabhashya.

=== Other works ===
- Bhavabhuti and His Place in Sanskrit Literature (1878)
- A Practical English-Sanskrit Dictionary (Part I, II and III) (1877–80)
- Higher Sanskrit Grammar: Gender and Syntax (1879)
- Ancient Geography of India (1880)
- A Companion to the Sanskrit-reading undergraduates of the Calcutta University (1878)
- Comparison of a comprehensive dictionary of all Dialects of Bengal.
