= Vishnu Bharati =

Vaishnavite writer

- Born: Kamrup region, Assam
- Occupation: Litterateur
- Writing career
- Language: Early Assamese
- Notable work: Dhruva Charit

Vishnu Bharati was a medieval vaishnavite writer from Kamrup region, Assam. His most notable work is "Dhruva Charit, which details life and character of Dhruva".

== See also ==
- Bhattadeva
- Sridhara Kandali
