= Kumud Kalita =

- Born: 1 April 1964 (age 61); Barpeta, Assam, India
- Citizenship: Indian
- Education: Master of Arts in political science
- Alma mater: Gauhati University
- Occupation(s): Writer, teacher, social worker
- Awards: National Teacher Award (2023); Children’s Champion Award (2023); Honorary Doctorate Award (2024)

Kumud Kalita (born 1 April 1964) is an Indian educator, social worker, and founder of Tapoban, a home for children with special needs and orphans. After starting his career as a teacher at Pathsala Mahavidyalaya in 1988, he dedicated his life to social service, particularly focusing on child welfare and disability support.

== Early life and education ==
Kumud Kalita was born on 1 April 1964, in Nizsaldah, a small village in Assam's Barpeta district to a farming family. His parents, Late Ramdas Kalita and Surabhi Kalita, struggled to make ends meet. Despite financial challenges, Kalita completed his matriculation in 1979 and graduated in 1984. He earned a Master of Arts degree in political science from Gauhati University in 1988.

== Founding of Tapoban ==
In 2005, Kalita established Tapoban, a home for children with special needs and orphans. The institution provides early intervention, physiotherapy, speech therapy, occupational therapy, and Braille education. Currently, Tapoban serves 25 residential children and 90 non-residential children from nearby areas, offering rehabilitation and holistic care. Kalita’s dedication has attracted support from NRIs, government officials, and various organizations.
