= Atul Chandra Hazarika =

Indian writer (1903–1986)

- Born: 9 September 1903; Nagaon, Assam
- Died: 7 June 1986 (aged 82); Guwahati, Assam
- Education: University of Calcutta
- Occupations: Teacher, Writer
- Spouse: Sabitri Hazarika
- Children: 1
- Relatives: Pushpa Lata Hazarika (mother)
- Writing career
- Pen name: Topobonor Kobi, Dipalir Kobi
- Language: Assamese
- Notable works: Dipali, Topoban, Manchalekha
- Notable awards: Sahitya Akademi Award (1969); Padma Shri (1971)

Atul Chandra Hazarika (1903–1986) was a prominent Assamese poet, dramatist, children's writer and translator. He was bestowed the epithet "Sahitycharjya" by Asam Sahitya Sabha, the premier literary organization of Assam.

== Life and literary works ==
Born on 9 September 1903, in the state of Assam of India, Atul Hazarika, obtained his M.A. degree from Calcutta University in 1943 and started his service life as teacher of Assamese literature. In 1961, he retired as a professor and head of the department of Assamese in Cotton College, Guwahati, Assam. Atul Hazarika was author of more than one hundred books in Assamese. In nineteen thirties he authored a record number of Assamese dramas to give a new lease of life to the Assamese stage. During the same time he became a household name as a young poet-"Dipalir Kobi". He also authored many story books for children. Some of his adaptations of western classics like "Grimor Xadhu", Andersonor Xadhu" became very popular. He was also compiler and editor of works of great as well as many lesser known writers of Assamese. He compiled and edited several works of Sahityarathi Lakshminath Bezbaroa and at the same time he collected and published in "Moroha Phoolor Koroni" works of many talented but lesser known writers who died in their early years. Atul Hazarika was also one of those pioneers who were responsible for giving a new face to Bihu-the national festival of Assam. He was associated with the founding committee, which organized for the first time Bihu on stage at a city pavilion in Guwahati some sixty years back. Atul Hazarika was also a great literary worker and as a general secretary, he was responsible for giving a new lease of life to Asam Sahitya Sabha in the fifties. He became the President of this apex literary organization of Assamese language in 1959.

His other literary works include,

=== Poetry Collection ===
- Monimala (1930)
- Panchajanya (1931)
- Dipali (1938)
- Mukutamala (1953)
- Tapoban (1955)
- Monmadhuri (1971)
- Monikut (1973)
- Raangdhali (1973)

=== Drama ===
- Narakasur (1930)
- Beula (1933)
- Kaunaj Kunwari (1933)
- Kurukhetra (1936)
- Shakuntala (1940)
- Banijkonwar (1940)
- Chhatrapati Shivaji (1947)
- Marjiyana (1948)
- Rukminiharan (1949)
- Ashrutirtha (1953)

=== Children's Literature ===
- Ichhapar Sadhu (1948)
- Lorar Jatak (1950)
- Katha Daxam (1951)
- Apeshwareer Sadhu (1952)
- Katha Kirtan (1955)
- Ramayanar Rahghora (1956)

=== Other ===
- Uchawar Rahgharaa (1962)
- Uchawar Rangchara (1963)
- Manchalekha (1967)

=== Collection ===
- Jatiya Sangeet (1948)
- Biswajyoti (1958)

== Awards ==
Hazarika was awarded Sahitya Akademi Award in 1969 for his magnum opus, Monchalekha, which traced five hundred years of Assamese drama and stage. He was also awarded Padma Shri by Government of India in 1971. Gauhati University has named one of its hostel as Sahitcharya Atul Chnadra Hazarika hostel. Government of Assam has been conferring Atul Chandra Hazarika award on tri-annual basis to noted cultural luminaries of Assam making significant contribution in the field of drama and mobile theaters.

== See also ==
- List of Indian poets
- Assamese literature
- List of people from Assam
- List of Assamese writers with their pen names
