= Hiren Bhattacharyya =

Indian poet and lyricist (1932–2012)

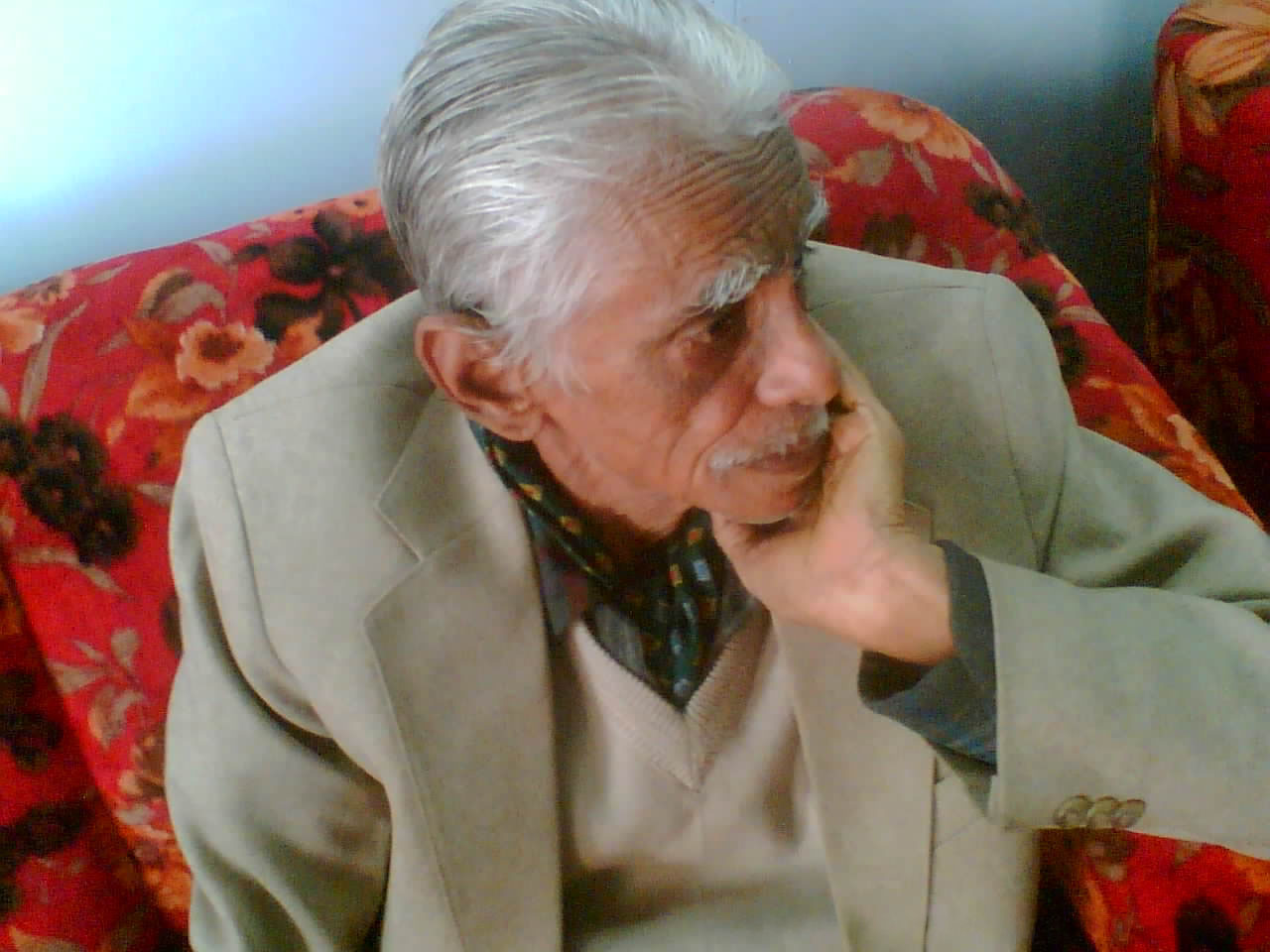
- Born: 28 July 1932; Jorhat, Assam
- Died: 4 July 2012 (aged 79); Guwahati, Assam, India
- Other name: Hiruda
- Occupations: Poet; lyricist
- Organisation: All India Students' Federation (AISF)
- Known for: Poet,Lyricist
- Awards: Sahitya Akademi Award

Hiren Bhattacharyya (28 July 1932 – 4 July 2012), popularly known as Hiruda, was an Indian poet and lyricist best known for his works in the Assamese literature. He had innumerable works published in Assamese and achieved many prizes and accolades for his poetry including Sahitya Akademi Award in 1992 for his anthology of poems 'Saichar Pathar Manuh'. He has been also known as 'Sugandi Pakhilaar Kobi'.

== Early life ==
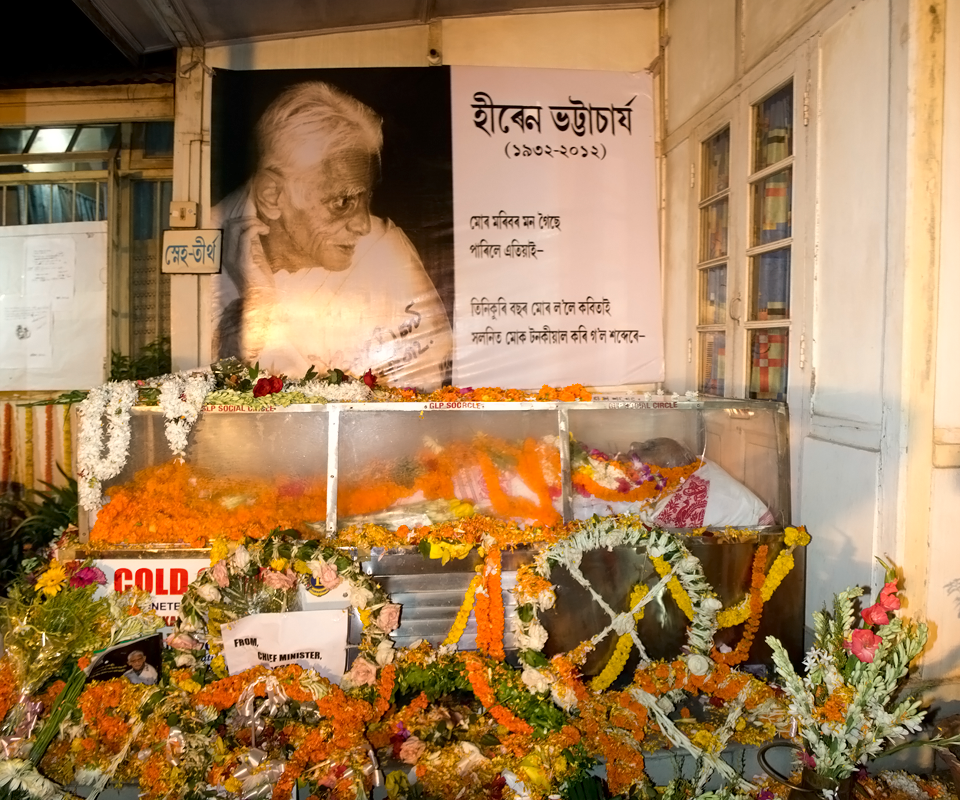
The Final Journey of Hiru Da

Bhattacharyya was born in Jorhat, Assam in the year 1932. His father was Tirthanath Bhattacharya and Mother Snehalata Bhattacharya. His father was a jailer. Due to his father’s occupation , he had to study in different parts of Assam from Dibrugarh to Guwahati.

He started his education from Graham Bazar M.E. School, Dibrugarh. But during his studies there, his father shifted from Dibrugarh to Tezpur. As a result, Bhattacharya completed his early education in Tezpur. Not only in Tezpur, he studied in different sites like Mangaldoi,Golaghat,Guwahati etc. In 1945, he passed High School Leaving Certificate Exam from Cotton Collegiate School and got admission in B. Borooah college.

== Literary works ==
Bhattacharyya mainly worked in the field of Assamese poetry. He was the editor of several Assamese magazines and newspapers. Some of the newspapers he worked on are Chitrabon, Monon and Antorik. He was the poetry editor of the Assamese magazine Prantik for over three decades.

=== Assamese books ===
He published anthologies of poetry include:

- ৰূপালী নদী সোণালী সাঁকো (জয়ন্ত বৰুৱাৰ সৈতে যুটীয়া ভাৱে) (Rupali Nodi Xunali Xaaku with Jayanta Baruah), (1960)
- ৰৌদ্ৰ কামনা (Roudro Kamona), (1964)
- তোমাৰ বাঁহী (Tomar Bahi)1969
- মোৰ দেশ আৰু প্ৰেমৰ কবিতা (Mor Desh aru Mor Premor Kobita), (1972)
- বিভিন্ন দিনৰ কবিতা (Bibhinno Dinor Kobita), (1974)
- তোমাৰ গান (Tomar Gaan), (1976)
- কবিতাৰ ৰ'দ (Kobitar Rod), (1977)
- সুগন্ধি পখিলা (Xugondhi Pokhilaa), (1981)
- জোনাকী মন : অনুষংগ (Jonaki mon), (1985)
- শইচৰ পথাৰ মানুহ (Soichor Pothar Manuh ), (1991)
- মোৰ প্ৰিয় বৰ্ণমালা (Mur Prio Bornomala), (1995)
- ভালপোৱাৰ বোকা মাটি (Bhalpuwar Boka Mati), (1995)
- ভালপোৱাৰ দিকচৌ বাটেৰে (Bhalpuwar Dikchou Batere), (2000)
- হীৰেন ভট্টাচাৰ্যৰ বাছকবনীয়া কবিতা (Hiren Bhattacharjya Basokbonia Kobita), (2003)
- সুগন্ধি শিপা (Xugandhi Xipaa), (2005)
- কেইটামান গান (Keitaman Gaan), (2007)
- কবিতাৰ ডালপাত (Kobitar Daalpaat), (2008)
- শিপাৰ পৰা পাতলৈকে (Xipaar pora patoloike) (2009)
- হীৰেন ভট্টাচাৰ্যৰ কবিতা :প্ৰথমৰ পৰা আটাইবোৰ (Hiren Bhattacharjyar Kobita: Prothomor Pora Aataibur) (2011)

=== Collections of rhymes for the young and old ===
- ল'ৰা ধেমালি (Lora Dhemali ) (1991) (Cartoon art by Benu Mishra)
- আকৌ ধেমালি (Akou Dhemali )(1991)
- ৰৈ ৰৈ ধেমালি (Roi Roi Dhemali)(2008)

=== English ===
- Ancient Gongs (English Translation by Pradip Acharya)
- Autumn and other landscapes (English Translation by Pradip Acharya)

=== Bengali ===
- শসে্যর মাঠ মানুষ ও অন্যান্য কবিতা (Shoishyer Math Manush O Onyanyo) (2002)
- শিকড় থেকে পাতা অব্দি (Shikor Theke Pata Obdi) (2011)
- বৃষ্টি পড়ে অঝোড়ে (Brishti Pode Ajhode) (2011)

Sample stanzas from his famous Assamese poems are:

তুমিতো জানাই
এই কবিৰ আৰু একো নাই।
এটাই মাথোঁ কামিজ
তাৰো ছিগো-ছিগো চিলাই।
প্ৰেম নিশ্চয় এনেকুৱাই
আৱৰণ খুলি হৃদয় জুৰায়।

— Hiren Bhattacharya, Bhogali (1971)

মৃত্যুওতো এটা শিল্প, জীৱনৰ কঠিন শিলত কটা এটি নিৰ্লোভ ভাষ্কৰ্য!

— Hiren Bhattacharya

== Awards ==
1. Raghunath Choudhary Award, 1976
2. Rajaji Puroskar, 1984-85 awarded by Bharatiya Vidya Bhawan
3. Bishnu Prasad Rabha Award, 1985
4. Soviet Land Nehru Award, 1987
5. Sahitya Akademi Award in 1992 for his anthology of poems 'Saichor Pathar Manuh'.
6. Bharatiya Bhasha Parishad Award in 1993
7. Souharda Samman of Uttar Pradesh Hindi Sangsthan, 1993
8. Assam Valley Literary Award, (Asom Upotyoka Sahitya Bota) 2000 awarded by Megor Sikhya Nyash
9. Ganesh Gogoi Award of the Assam Government, 2009
10. Padmanath Vidyabinod Smriti Sahitya Puraskar in 2011
- Source

== See also ==
- List of Indian poets
- Assamese literature
- History of Assamese literature
- List of Assamese-language poets
- Jyoti Prasad Agarwala
- Nabakanta Baruah
- Anindita Pal
- Zubeen Garg
