= Khiren Roy =

- Born: 21 June 1941; Matia (Goalpara), Assam
- Died: 11 March 2009 (aged 67); Guwahati, Assam
- Education: MA in English literature PhD in Mass Communication
- Occupations: Journalist; Newspaper Editor; Writer
- Spouse: Gayatri Roy
- Children: Arupa Roy Pathare; Antara Roy Oruganti
- Website: http://www.khirenroy.com/

Khiren Roy was a veteran journalist and editor to some English and Assamese Dailies published from Assam. He was born at Matia, a hamlet in Goalpara district of Assam.

== Education ==
Roy completed his MA in English literature and PhD in Mass Communication from Gauhati University. He also participated in a higher course of journalism jointly organized by the Press Institute of India and the Thomson Foundation, U.K.

== Career ==
Roy started his career as a staff reporter to The Assam Tribune and later became the Deputy Editor of it. He was also the editor of The North East Times and Meghalaya Guardian. Then he established a publishing house named The Frontier Publication Pvt Ltd, launched the Assamese daily Asomiya Khabar and worked as the Chief editor of it. He was also involved in teaching Journalism and Creative Writing at the Gauhati University, Indira Gandhi National Open University at Guwahati and Shillong.

== Works ==
Roy authored a number of novels and storybooks. Here is a list of them.

== Personal life ==
He married Gayatri on 14 May 1975 and fathered two daughters – Arupa and Antara.

== Death ==
On 11 March 2009, at the age of 68, Roy died following a cardiac failure.
