= Lakshyadhar Choudhury =

Indian writer (1915–2000)

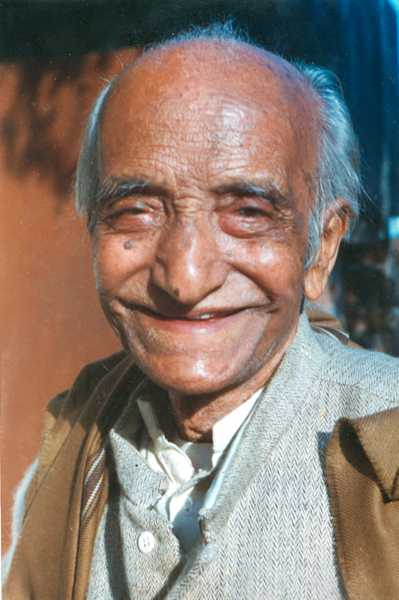
- Lakhyadhar Chaudhury
- Born: 14 October 1914; North Guwahati, Assam, India
- Died: 18 August 2000 (aged 85)
- Citizenship: Indian
- Occupations: Dramatist, actor, poet and writer
- Spouse: Usha Choudhury
- Children: Dr. Amarjyoti Choudhury; Dr. Anjanjyoti Choudhury; Dr. Arupjyoti Choudhury; Anupjyoti Choudhury; Mrs. Anuradha Das
- Writing career
- Language: Assamse
- Notable works: Nimila Onko, Umola Ghar

Member of Assam Legislative Assembly
- In office 1967–1972
- Preceded by: Sarat Chandra Goswami
- Succeeded by: Girindra Choudhury
- Constituency: Kamalpur
- Website: lakshyadharchoudhurymemorialtrust.org

Lakhyadhar Choudhury (14 October 1915 – 18 August 2000) was an actor, playwright, film-director, humanist, prose-writer, orator, cabinet-minister in the state of Assam, state legislator, teacher, 'freedom fighter', president of the Asam Sahitya Sabha and the Asom Natya Sanmelan.

== Early life and education ==
Lakhyadhar Choudhury was born in Rangmahal, North Guwahati on the Dipwali night of 1915 to Bhudhar and Uma Choudhury. He was admitted to Cotton Collegiate High School in 1925. He passed his BSc examination from Cotton College, Guwahati in 1933. During his student life Lakhyadhar lodged with his uncle Sasha Choudhury of Uzan Bazar, Guwahati who was a peskar-an employee in the DC Court.

== Career ==
He started his career as a teacher at the North Guwahati Auniati Kamaldev High School in 1939 but quit his job in 1942 to join the freedom movement launched under the leadership of Mahatma Gandhi. He plunged into the Quit India Movement, working as a volunteer and linkman between the leaders, carrying their secret messages while posing as a salesman. Later he went underground to avoid arrest by the police. During the movement, he came into contact with leaders like Loknayak Jai Prakash Narayan, Acharya Kripalani, Aruna Asaf Ali, Achyut Patwardhan, Ram Manohar Lohia, etc. and was attracted to the socialism preached by these leaders.

== Political activities ==
After India's independence, Choudhury was attracted to the ideals of socialism and engaged himself in political activities through the Socialist Party. He contested the first elections of free India in 1952 as a Socialist Party candidate, but was defeated by the Congress candidate, Rohini Kumar Choudhury. In the 1957 elections to the Assam Legislative Assembly also, he contested from Kamalpur constituency without success. However, he won the Guwahati Municipal Corporation election in 1964–65. In 1967, he was elected as a member of the Assam Legislative Assembly. Others who won in the same election were Bhupen Hazarika and Bishnu Prasad Rabha. These three prominent figures of Assamese culture were elected in the same election and served together in the Assembly. Always steadfast in his political beliefs, Choudhury again won in the 1977 election, immediately after the days of The Emergency and joined the Golap Borbora ministry of Janata Party as a cabinet minister of Education and cultural affairs. After this election there was great commotion and a mass movement in the country. Lakhyadhar Choudhury proved his ability as the Mayor of the Guwahati Municipal Corporation in 1975. He was the second Mayor of the Corporation immediately after Radha Govinda Baruah.

== Personal life ==
He married Usha at Dibrugarh in 1949. Usha served as a teacher in the Panbazar Girls' High School, Guwahati. They have four sons and a daughter.

== As an actor and a playwright ==
Since his student days, Choudhury earned fame as an actor. Later, he became a politician and educationist. But his real fame was as a playwright and a writer of prose. While studying in school he came into contact with dramatist Kamakhyanath Thakur and litterateur Jaltiram Lahkar and was enthused. Choudhury was known for his stories and dramas. As a student of class-IX he wrote a play titled Ekalavya. His other plays are – Raksha Kumar, Ali Baba, Omala Ghar, Nimila Anka etc. In his play Thikana, he stressed the necessity of being aware of roots and traditions. His histrionic talent was expressed on stage, film, radio and television plays. From the temporary makeshift stage of Rang Mahal to the Kumar Bhaskar Natya Mandir, he traversed a long way. Choudhury, also directed films like Nimila Anka and Lachit Barpukhan. He also acted in a number of Assamese films.

== As a poet and story writer ==
He also wrote a handful of poems including Mor Lakshya. But his fame as a litterateur rests more on his prose. His stories are noted for their distinctive style. His stories are based on the real life of the common people, which is full of tragic-comic events. His stories depicted the everyday lives of ordinary people.

== As a theatre actor ==
On the occasion of the inauguration of the new building of the theater hall, Choudhury's drama Thikana was staged for two nights, where he played the leading role. That was on May 12 and 13, 2000. At that time, Choudhury's age was 85 years. The theater hall was full to its capacity with spectators who went to witness Choudhury acting at the age of 85 years. Soon afterwards, Choudhury fell ill and died on August 18, 2000. Choudhury typically wore dhoti and kurta made of khadi cloth.
