= Nabin Chandra Bardoloi =

Indian writer and politician

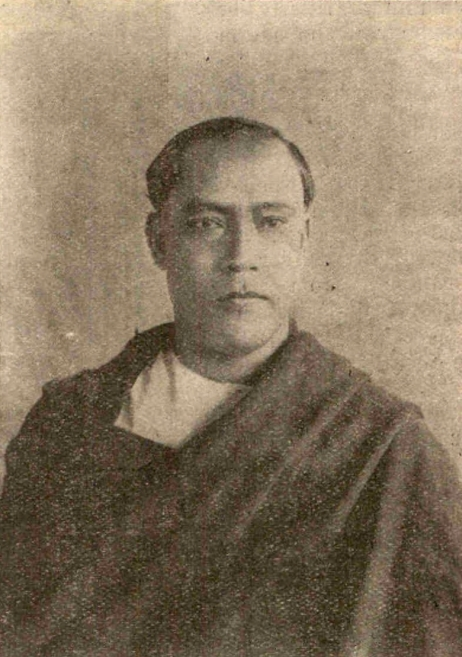
- Born: 1875; North Gauhati, Assam
- Died: 1936 (aged 60–61)
- Other names: Karmabir
- Education: Calcutta University, Presidency College
- Known for: Indian independence movement
- Spouse: Hemanta Kumari Devi

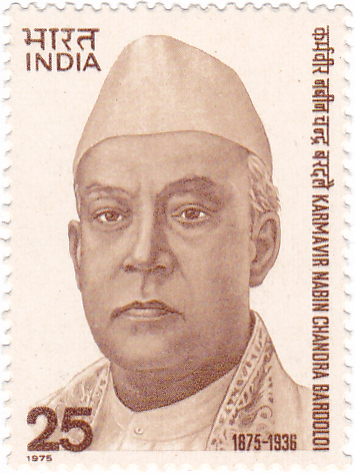
Bardoloi on a 1975 stamp of India

Nabin Chandra Bardoloi (1875–1936) was an Indian writer, politician and leader of Indian National Congress party from Assam. An Indian independence movement activist, he was a prominent leader from Assam in the Non-cooperation movement (1920–1922) of Mahatma Gandhi. He was conferred with Karmabir title for his works and contribution towards the people of Assam. The Government of India issued a commemorative postage stamp in his honour during his birth centenary year in 1975. His daughter Nalini Bala Devi was a noted Assamese poet and writer, who also wrote his biography, Smritir Tirtha (1948). He was the first General secretary of Assam Pradesh Congress Committee.
