= Mahendra Nath Deka Phukan =

Indian activist, journalist, artist and poet

Mahendranath Dekaphukan (1903–1974) or Monai Boiragi in full Mahendra Nath Moi Heng Dang Deka Phukan was an artist, poet, journalist and craftsman of Assam.

== Early life ==
He was the elder son of Lakshminath Phukan of Guwahati. After schooling from Cotton Collegiate High School, he took adminission at Cotton College. He left from home in mid of study and wandered many places.

== Life ==
He was assistant editor of Rangoon Mail, published from Rangoon. He came to attach The London Art Co., when he was in Myanmar, and made some experimental films, but he could not store for future. After that he joined Assam Bengal Press of Kolkata as manager. One of his existing creations is the symbol of Cotton College, Guwahati, but most of his works could not be stored.

A hostel in Cotton College established in his memory named Mahendra Nath Deka Phukan (MNDP).

== Personal life ==
He married in Assam a Christian woman, Miss Claris, he named her Jyotirmoi Devi.
