= Maheswar Neog =

Indian historian, scholar and poet (1915–1995)

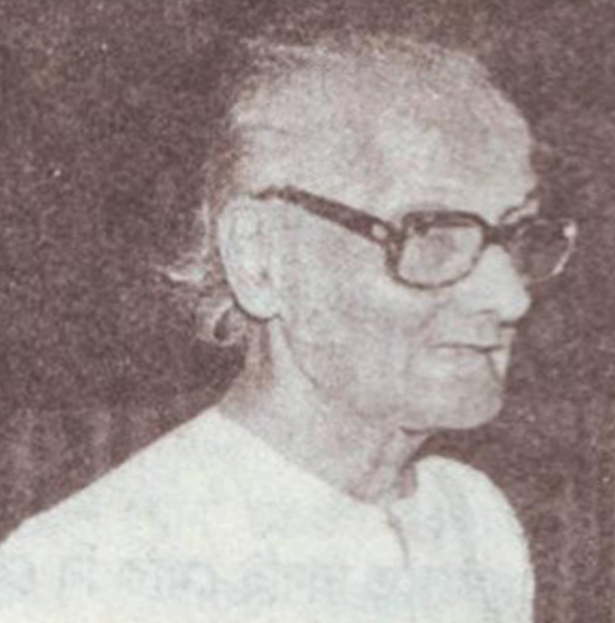
- Born: 7 September 1915; Sibsagar, Assam, India
- Died: 13 September 1995 (aged 80)
- Occupations: Professor and Writer
- Parent(s): Manik Chandra Neog and Chandra Probha Neog

Professor Maheswar Neog (7 September 1915 – 13 September 1995) was an Indian academic who specialised in the cultural history of the North East India especially Assam, besides being an Assamese-language scholar and poet. He was a top Indologist, and his work covers all disciplines of Indian studies, folk-lore, language, dance, history, music, religion, drama, fine arts, paintings, historiography and hagiography, lexicography and orthography, epigraphy and ethnography. His research includes multi-dimensional features of Vaishnava renaissance in Assam through Srimanta Sankardev, Madhabdev, Damodardev, Haridev, Bhattadev and other Vaishnava saints of Assam.

An editorial in The Assam Tribune called him "a versatile scholar and visionary thinker with encyclopedic range." He remained Jawaharlal Nehru Professor at Gauhati University and later Saint Sankaradeva Professor at Punjabi University.

He was awarded the Padma Shri, India's fourth highest civilian honour in 1974, also in the same year he remained the President of Asam Sahitya Sabha (Assam Literary Society). In 1994, he was awarded the Sangeet Natak Akademi Fellowship the highest honour conferred by Sangeet Natak Akademi, India's National Academy for Music, Dance and Drama.

== Bibliography ==
- Maheswar Neog (1953). Śaṅkaradeva and His Predecessors. Lawyer's Book Stall.
- Maheswar Neog (1959). The Art of Painting in Assam. Gauhati.
- Maheswar Neog; Yadupati; Keshav Changkakati (1962). Rhythm in the Vaishnava music of Assam. Bargīt Research Committee, Asam Sangeet Natak Akademi.
- Maheswar Neog (1972). Lakshminath Bezbaroa: the Sāhityarathī of Assam. Dept. of Publication; Gauhati University.
- Maheswar Neog (1975). Assamese Drama and Theatre: A Series of Two Lectures(Delivered at the Indian School of Drama and Asian Theatre Centre, New Delhi, April 1962). Neog.
- Maheswar Neog (1975). Sattrīyā dances.
- Maheswar Neog (1976). Annals of Asam Sahitya-Sabha, 1917–1975. Asam Sahitya-Sabha.
- Maheswar Neog (1980). Early History of the Vaiṣṇava Faith and Movement in Assam: Śaṅkaradeva and His Times. Motilal Banarsidass Pub. ISBN 978-81-208-0007-6.
- Maheswar Neog (1980). Anandaram Dhekiyal Phukan. Sahitya Akademi.
- Maheswar Neog (1982). Socio-political Events in Assam Leading to the Militancy of the Māyāmariyā Vaiṣṇavas. Centre for Studies in Social Sciences, Calcutta.
- Sankaradeva; Maheswar Neog (1982). The Bhakti-ratnākara of Śaṅkaradeva. Publication Bureau, Punjabi University.
- Maheswar Neog (1983). Bhaona: the ritual play of Assam. Sangeet Natak Akademi.
- Maheswar Neog (1983). Lachit Barphukan: The Victor of the Battle of Saraighat. Publications Division, Ministry of I &B, Govt. of India.
- Maheswar Neog (1984). Religions of the North-east: Studies in the Formal Religions of North-eastern India. Munshiram Manoharlal.
- Maheswar Neog (1985). Nidhi Levi Farwell. Sahitya Akademi.
- Maheswar Neog (1986). Gīta-Govinda in the Assam School of Painting. Publication Board, Assam.
- Maheswar Neog (1990). Professor Maheswar Neog Felicitation Volume: Volume on Art and Culture of India with Particular Reference to Assam. Bani Prokash Pvt. Ltd.
- Dr. Maheswar Neog Publication Trust; Maheswar Neog (1995). "Maheswar Neog" on His Eighty First Birthday. Maheswar Neog Publ. Trust.
- Maheswar Neog (1998). The Contribution of the Śaṅkaradeva Movement to the Culture and Civilisation of India. Forum for Śaṅkaradeva Studies.
- Maheswar Neog (2004). Cultural Heritage of Assam. Omsons Publications. ISBN 978-81-7117-212-2.
- Maheswar Neog (2004). Essays on Assamese Literatures. Omsons Publications. ISBN 978-81-7117-213-9.
- Maheshwar Neog (2005). Sankaradeva. National Book Trust, India. ISBN 978-81-237-2758-5.
- Maheswar Neog (2008). Aesthetic Continuum: Essays on Assamese Music, Drama, Dance and Paintings. Omsons Publications.
- Maheshwar Neog (2010). Religions of the North-East: Studies In The Formal Religions Of North-Eastern India. Munshiram Manoharlal Pub. ISBN 978-81-215-0125-5.
- Maheswar Neog (2011). The Creative Force Behind the Śaṅkaradeva Renaissance: Bhakti and Other Aspects (i.e. Aspects of the Neo-Vaiṣṇava Movement in Assam). Professor Maheswar Neog Memorial Trust by Chandra Prakash. ISBN 978-81-244-0161-3.
- Maheswar Neog (2011). Tradition and Style: A Few Studies on Assamese Culture. Professor Maheswar Neog Memorial Trust by Chandra Prakash. ISBN 978-81-244-0160-6.
- Mukunda Madhava Sharma; Satyanarayana Ratha (1974). Dr. Maheswar Neog: A Profile and a Short Bibliography. Lawyer's Book Stall.
