= Nabakanta Barua =

Assamese novelist and poet (1926–2002)

- Born: 29 December 1926
- Died: 14 July 2002 (aged 75)
- Occupations: Poet, novelist
- Writing career
- Language: Assamese

Nabakanta Barua (29 December 1926 – 14 July 2002) was a prominent Assamese novelist and poet. He was also known as Ekhud Kokaideu. As Sima Dutta he wrote many poems in his early life.

== Biography ==
=== Early life ===
Nabakanta Barua was born 29 December 1926 in Guwahati to Nilakanta Barua, a school inspector and later teacher, and Swarnalata Baruani. He had three brothers: Devakanta, Jivakanta, and Sivakanta. Dev Kant Barua, the eldest among the brothers was the President of the Indian National Congress during the Indian Emergency (1975-1977) and served as the Governor of Bihar from 1 February 1971 to 4 February 1973. Dev Kant Barua was also a well-known poet, best known for Sagor dekhisa, a collection of Assamese poems. At first the family lived in upper Assam, then moved to Puranigudam and lastly lived in Nagaon town.

=== Education ===
He started his education at a nearby school, then joined govt. Mojolia school. In 1933 he was admitted to Nagaon govt. boys school in class 3, from there he completed his matriculation in 1941. After that he got admitted to Cotton College, but he lost two years due to illness. In 1943, he went to Shantinikaton (West Bengal). In 1947 he completed his B.A. with English honors and in 1953 M. A. from Aligarh Muslim University.

=== Career ===
He worked in Uttar Pradesh at Shikohabad at A.K. college, but the same year he had joined Jorhat's Jagannath Barooah College. In 1954 he joined Cotton College and worked there until 1964. From 1964 to 1967 he worked at Assam Madhyamik Shiksha Parisod as an officer of English education. He again joined Cotton College, retiring as a vice principal in 1984.

He served as president of Asam Sahitya Sabha's Dhing Adhibashan in 1968 and presided over Asom Sahitya Sabha's Bishwanath Chariali convention in 1990.

=== Death ===
Nabakanta Barua died on 14 July 2002.

== Awards ==
- 1974: Assam Prakashan Parisod Award, Mur aru Prithibir
- 1975: Sahitya Akademi Award to Assamese Writers, Kokadeutar Har
- 1976: Padma Bhushan, Literature & Education
- 1993: Assam Valley Literary Award
- 1998: Kamal Kumari National Award

== See also ==
- Assamese literature
- List of Indian poets
- List of Indian writers
- History of Assamese literature
- List of people from Assam
- List of Assamese-language poets
- List of Assamese writers with their pen names
