= The North East Times =

English daily newspaper in Northeast India

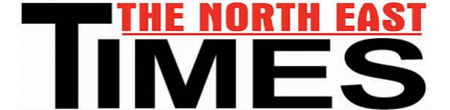

- Front page of 5 October 2009 issue
- Type: Daily newspaper
- Format: Broadsheet
- Owner: G. L. Agarwalla
- Publisher: G. L. Publications Ltd
- Editor: Khiren Roy
- Founded: 2 October 1990
- Political alignment: Center-left
- Language: English
- Circulation: 113,000
- Website: http://net.glpublications.in/

The North East Times is an English daily newspaper distributed in Northeast India. It was launched by GL Publications Ltd. on October 2, 1990. The circulation figure is 113,000.

== See also ==
- List of Assamese periodicals
