= Rudra Baruah =

Rudra Barua
- Born: 26 November 1926; Bhimor gaon, Puranigudam, Nagaon
- Died: 14 February 1980 (aged 53)
- Occupations: Singer, music director, actor
- Instrument: Harmonium

Luit Konwar Rudra Barua was one of the foremost music pioneers of Assam. He was an actor, composer, lyricist, singer, and musician. He served with the Government of Assam in the Public Relations Department (since renamed as the Directorate of Information and Public Relations) and established the Culture & Film Division in the 1970s.

He was conferred the title Luit Konwar in honour of his sterling work towards the development of music and cinema in Assam.

He was born in Bhimor village near Puranigudam in Nagaon district in 1926 and lived in Guwahati later on. He appeared in and directed music for several Assamese films and composed a lot of folk music in the local language. He died on 14 February 1980 leaving behind his wife and three sons.

== Films ==
- Kallol (Music Director)

== Songs ==
- Poka dhanor maje maje (lyrics, music)
- Kauri pore (music)
- Kasot kolochi haali jaali koon menoka aahe (lyrics, music)
