= Parvati Prasad Baruva =

Indian poet, lyricist, and dramatist

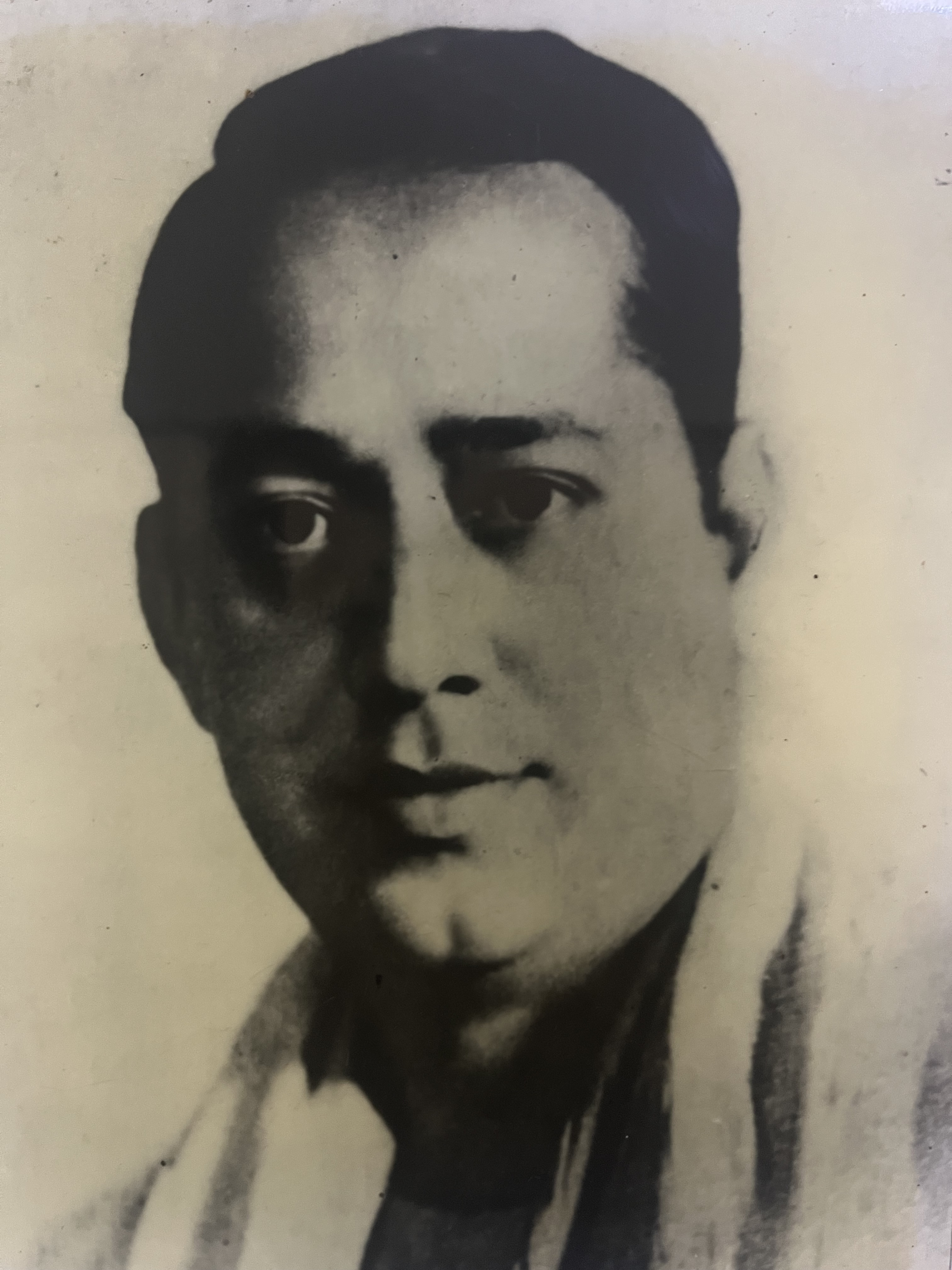
- Born: 19 August 1904; Sibsagar, Assam
- Died: 7 June 1964 (aged 59)
- Education: Cotton College, Guwahati; Scottish Church College,Kolkata
- Occupations: Poet; Lyricist; Filmmaker; Dramatist; Tea planter
- Spouse: Padma Kumari Baruva
- Children: Santvana; Bandana; Pranavi Ram; Kalpana; Manavi Ram; Bharavi Ram; Arpana
- Writing career
- Pen name: Geetikobi
- Language: Assamese

Parvati Prasad Baruva (1904–1964) was a noted poet, lyricist, and dramatist. An icon of Assamese literature and the culture of Assam. Known for his simple and sensitive use of the Assamese language, he is popularly known as the Geetikavi; the lyrical poet of Assam. He was also one of the early pioneering filmmakers of Assamese cinema.

== Early life and education ==
He was born on 19 August 1904 near the banks of the Dikhow river in Sibsagar, Assam to Radhika Prasad Baruva and Himala Devi. Parvati Prasad's great-grandfather Jaduram Deka Baruva wrote the first bilingual Assamese dictionary in 1839.

Parvati Prasad graduated in philosophy from Kolkata's Scottish Church College as a graduating student of the University of Calcutta. During his sojourn in Kolkata, he would watch plays, dance dramas (or Rabindra Nritya Natyas) and other musical events based on the works of Rabindranath Tagore. These experiences helped to further hone his creativity as a music composer later.

== Works ==
Parvati Prasad, at the age of ten, for the first time, played the part of 'Joymoti', in a play staged by the local theater group. In 1921, he started a hand written monthly magazine called Jhupitora.

=== Cinema ===
- He directed the fourth Assamese movie Rupohi which was released in 1941. He also composed the music for this film.

=== Poetry and music ===
- Bhonga Tukarir Sur: Book of poems
- Gungunani : Published book of songs; including Pujo Aha, Nobolo Tuk, and Tor Nai Je Bondhuwa Baat
- Luiti : Published book of bongeets about the river Luit; including Luitor Saporit Kore Naworiya
- Sukula Dawor Oi Kohuwa Phul : Published book of songs about the seasons of autumn (fall); including Sarodi Sandhiyar Jonaki Mel
- Lakhhimi : dance drama
- Sonar Soleng : dance drama

=== Dramas ===
- ‘Lakhimi’ and
- ‘Sonar Soleng'.

== Translations and awards ==
Baruva’s poetry has been translated into Hindi, English and many other Indian languages. English translations of his poems by Paromita Das under the titles "If Life Be Lost" and "Life Awakens" was conferred with Sahitya Akademi Golden Jubilee Literary Translation Award in 2007.

== See also ==
- Assamese literature
- Music of Assam
- List of Indian poets
- List of people from Assam
- List of Assamese writers with their pen names
