= Rudra Kandali =

- Born: Kamrup
- Occupation: Litterateur
- Writing career
- Language: Early Assamese
- Notable work: Satyaki Prabesh

Rudra Kandali was a litterateur from Kamrup. He was a well known poet of the medieval period and contemporary of the likes of Haribara Vipra and Hema Saraswati.

He wrote short narrative poems based on the episodes of Mahabharata. He translated an episode of Drona Parva of Mahabharata relating to powers of Satyaki, son of Siva of Yadu race which (translation) is faithful, homely similes and metaphors are frequently used. Called Satyaki Prabesh, he did it under the patronage of Tamradhvaj, the successor of Dharmanarayan of Kamata kingdom fame.

== See also ==
- Gopalacharana Dwija
- Bhusana Dvija
