= Bakul Kayastha =

Indian mathematician

- Born: c. 1400
- Died: c. 1450
- Occupation: Mathematician
- Writing career
- Notable works: Kitabat Manjari, Lilavati

Bakul Kayastha (born c. 1400) was a Kayastha mathematician from Kamrup. He was especially known for his masterpiece in the field of mathematics named Kitabat Manjari, written in 1434, and Lilavati.

Kitabat Manjari is a poetical treatise on arithmetic, surveying and bookkeeping. The book teaches how accounts are to be kept under different heads and how stores belonging to the royal treasury are to be classified and entered into a stock book. The works of Bakul Kayastha were regarded as standards in his time to be followed by other Kayasthas in maintaining royal accounts.

== See also ==
- Bhattadeva
- Hema Saraswati
