= Nalini Bala Devi =

Indian writer and poet (1898–1977)

- Born: 23 March 1898; Barpeta, Assam
- Died: 24 December 1977 (aged 79)
- Citizenship: India
- Occupations: Poet, writer
- Spouse: Jibeswar Changkakoti
- Writing career
- Language: Assamese
- Notable works: Sondhiyara Sur; Alakananda
- Notable awards: Sahitya Akademi Award; Padma Shri

Nalini Bala Devi (23 March 1898– 24 December 1977) was an Indian writer and poet of Assamese literature, known for nationalistic as well as mystical poetry. She was awarded the Padma Shri by the Government of India in 1957 for her contribution to literature, and 1968 she won the Sahitya Akademi Award given by Sahitya Akademi (India's National Academy of Letters) for her poetry collection Alakananda. She is the first woman Assamese poet to be awarded with Padma Shri and the first lady to the chair the Assam Sahitya Sabha.

== Biography ==
She was born in Barpeta, Assam in 1898. Her father, Karmaveer Nabin Chandra Bordoloi (1875–1936), was an Assamese Indian freedom movement activist and writer. She wrote her first poem, Pita at age 10, and was married at age 12, but her husband, Jeeveshwar Changkakoti, died when she was 19. Two of her sons also died early in her life. She began writing poems, with emotion, tragedy, patriotism and devotion as central themes, which are still acclaimed in Assamese literature.

Her first book of poems Sandhiyar Sur (Evening Melody), published in 1928, was later adopted by Calcutta University and Guwahati University as a textbook in 1946 and 1951 respectively. Her other works include Alakananda, Sopunar Sur (Melody of Dreams), Porosh Moni, Yuga Devata (Hero of the Age), Shesh Puja (The last worship), Parijator Abhishek, Prahlad, Meghdut, Suravi, Rooprekha, Shantipath (Essay anthology), Sheshor Sur (The last Melody)m Smritir Tirtha (Biography on her father), Biswadeepa (A collection of biographies of famous women), Eri oha Dinbur (The Days Passed, Autobiography), Sardar Vallavbhai Patel are some of her biographical works. She had to her credit one drama titled Meerabai.

In 1950, she established Sadou Asom Parijat Kanan which later become famous as Moina Parijat, the children organisation in Assam. She was the president of 23rd Jorhat session of Assam Sahitya Sabha (Assam Literary Society) in 1955.

She died on 24 December 1977, but is remembered in Assamese literature by the last four lines of her famous poem NaatGhar (The theatre)

....Kun Kar Jogotor / Kun Kar Moromor / Chokur Chinaki Dudinor // Sasimor Rooprekha /Asimot Bur Jabo / Khohi Gole Jori Moromor (Who's for whom in this world / Who's under whose care / Temporary acquaintances, eye-to-eye contacts these are with // Bounded facial outlines / That get dissolved in the infinite oblivion / If the thread of love that binds them snaps.)

The Cotton College, Guwahati named its girls hostel after her as 'Padmashree Nalini Bala Devi Girls' Hostel' in 1986. The Sadou Asom Lekhika Samaroh Samiti literary organization has published Mahasweta, about her works.

== Works ==
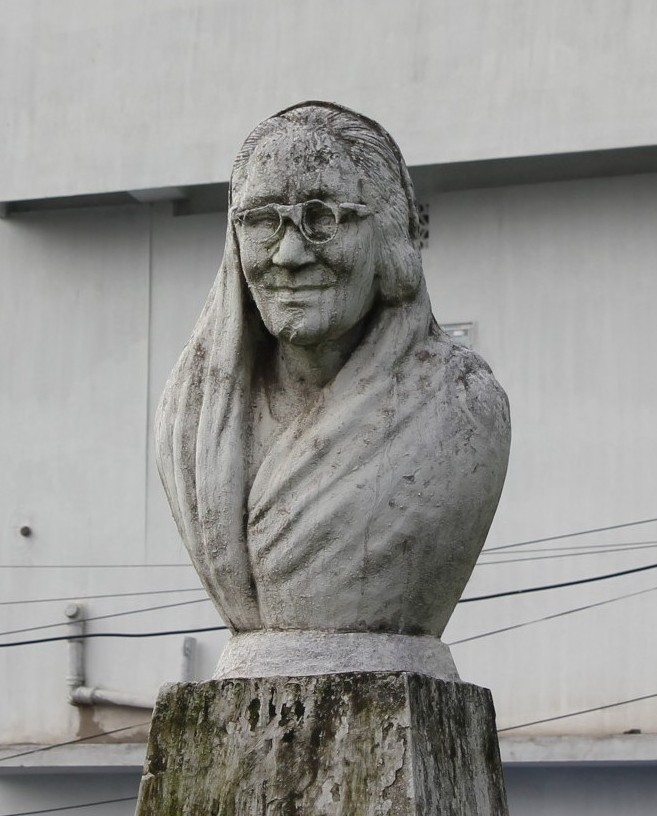
Statue at Paltan Bazar, Guwahati

- Sandhiyar Sur (Evening Melody, 1928)
- Sopunar Sur (Melody of Dreams, 1943)
- Smritir Tirtha (Biography, 1948)
- Paroshmoni (Touchstone, 1954)
- Jagriti (Awakening, 1962)
- Alakananda (1967)

== Awards and recognition ==
She was awarded with Sahitya Akademi Award for her poetry anthology Alakananda in 1968 and conferred Padma Shri in 1957 by the Government of India.
