= Sarvabhauma Bhattacharya =

- Born: 15th century Nadiya
- Children: Jaleswar
- Writing career
- Language: Bengali
- Subject: Naya Sastra

Sarvabhauma Bhattacharya was medieval Pandit and Bhakti reformer from Kamrup. As a vedantist of the Advaita school, he refuted the monistic doctrines of Sankaradeva.

== See also ==
- Adwita Makaranda
- Chaitanya Mahaprabhu
