= Ananta Kandali =

Indian poet (1540–1580)

Haricharan Kandali
- Born: January 1540
- Died: 1580 (aged 39–40)
- Writing career
- Pen name: Ananta Kandali
- Language: Assamese language
- Notable works: Mahiravana Vadha, Harihara Yuddha, Vrttrasura Vadha, Kumara Harana, Sahasra Nama Vrttanta

Ananta Kandali (1540–1580) was Brahmin poet from Hajo, Kamrup district. Ananta Kandali's real name was Haricharan, but he is popularly known by his scholastic title "Ananta Kandali". His father, Ratna Pathak, was a renowned scholar and expounder of the Bhagavata at the Madhava temple.

As a prolific writer, Kandali gained many literary distinctions, and acquired titles like "Ananta Kandali". He became a disciple of Sankardev and attracted towards Vaisnava cult.

== See also ==
- Bhattadeva
- Hema Saraswati
