= Damodardev =

Indian Ekasarana preceptor (1488–1598)

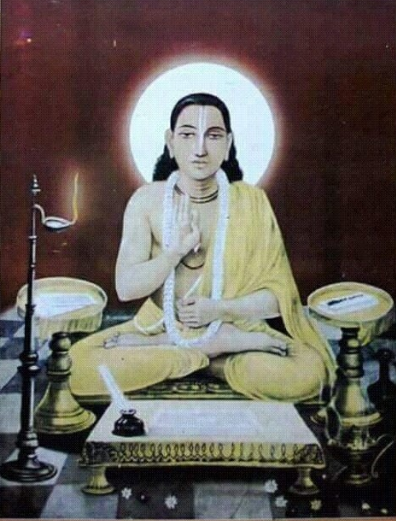
- Sri Sri Damordadeva Ata
- Born: January 1488; Nalaca, Nagaon
- Died: 1598 (aged 109–110); Vaikunthapur Sattra
- Occupation: Ekasarana preceptor
- Writing career
- Language: Assamese, Sanskrit
- Period: medieval period

Damodardev (1488–1598) was a sixteenth-century Ekasarana preceptor from present-day Nagaon in the Indian state of Assam. Damodardev was a follower of Sankardev's Ekasarana Dharma order. He started his own order after the death of Sankardev that came to be called the Brahma sanghati, which admitted Brahmanical rituals and greater adherence to the caste system alongside the namadharma of Sankardev. He was succeeded by Bhattadeva.

== Early life ==
Damodardev was born in the state of Assam in a village called Nalaca, in present-day Nagaon, in 1488. He was the third and youngest son of Sushila and Satananda, a Brahmin couple. Nalaca was close to Bordowa Than, Sankardev's native place, and Satananda was Sankardev's friend. Damodardev and his family moved from Ahom kingdom territory after Sankardev moved from Dhuwahat to Barpeta in 1546 and settled, after some wandering close to Patbausi, or Chandravatipura near Sankardev's sattra. Damodardev received his education along with his two brothers under Kalpacandra of Navadwip in Bengal, where they studied detailed grammar, derivations and usage of words, four Vedas, fourteen scriptures, the Bhagavad Gita, the Bhagavata Purana, and other religious books.

== Time with Sankardev and Sattra ==
Early biographers of Damodardev are unanimous that he was inspired and influenced by Sankardev in his religious practice and he began proselytising in Barpeta. After meeting Damodardev, Sankardev asked him to recite Bhagavata in his sattra, for which Damodardev replied, "yours is the land where tree of Bhakti can grow," and this marked the beginning of friendship between them. Sankara requested him to initiate Brahmin disciples. Sankardev also initiated Damodardev to the Mahapurushiya cult.

== See also ==
- Durgabar Kayastha
- Bhusana Dvija
