= Early Assamese =

Form of Assamese spoken from 1300 to 1600

- Region: Assam
- Era: 14th-16th centuries
- Language family: Indo-European: Indo-Iranian; Indo-Aryan; Eastern; Bengali-Assamese; Early Assamese
- Early form: Kāmarūpī Apabhraṃśa
- Dialects: Brajawali
- Writing system: Eastern Nagari

Language codes
- ISO 639-3: –
- Glottolog: None

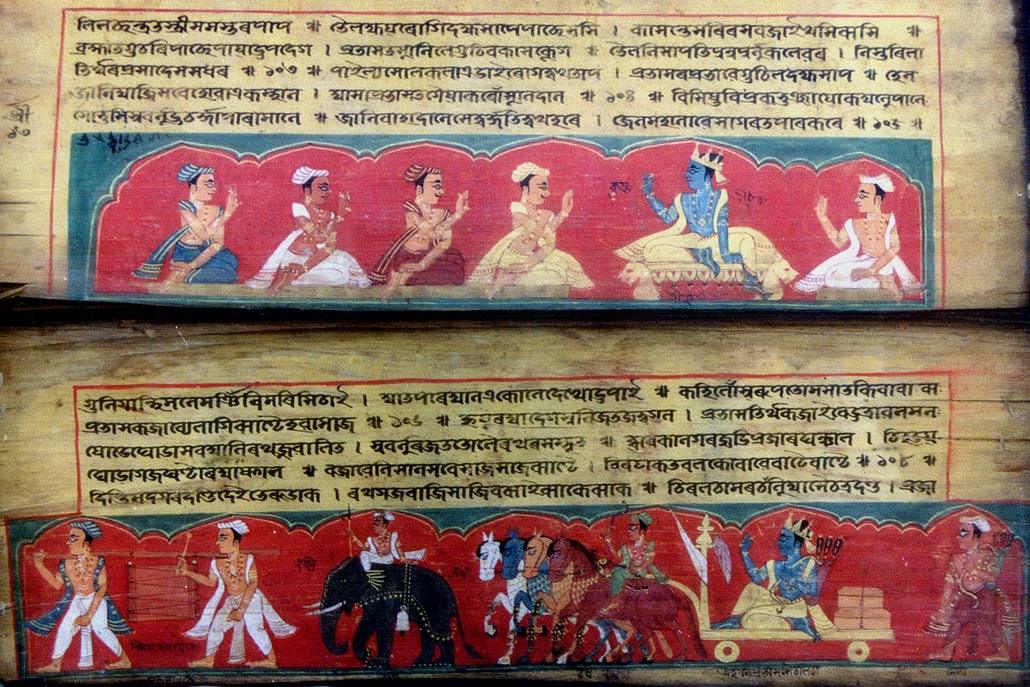
A Bhagavata manuscript written in Early Assamese, from Dakhinpat Satra.

Early Assamese or Proto-Eastern Kamarupa is an ancestor of the modern Assamese language. It is found in the literature from the 14th century to the end of 16th century in Kamata kingdom and rest the Brahmaputra Valley of Assam.

== Literature ==
Early Assamese literature period can be split into: a) The Pre-Vaishnavite period and b) The Vaishnavite sub periods. The Pre-Vaishnavite period covers the period before the advent of Sankardeva and the Vaishnavite period initiated by his literary activities. The earliest Assamese writer, viz. Hema Saraswati and Harivara Vipra who composed Prahlada Charitra and Babruvahana parva respectively wrote under the patronage of King Durlabhanarayana of Kamatapura who ruled towards the end of the 13th or the earlier part of the 14th century. The next two important poets of the same period are Rudra Kandali and Kaviratna Saraswati who composed Drona parva and Jayadratha vadha. But the towering poet of this period is Madhava Kandali who is respectfully referred to by Sankardeva (b. 1449) as his predecessor. Madhava Kandali flourished towards the end of the 14th century and translated the entire Ramayana under the patronage of Mahamanikya, the then Varāha king of Central Assam.

== Writing system ==
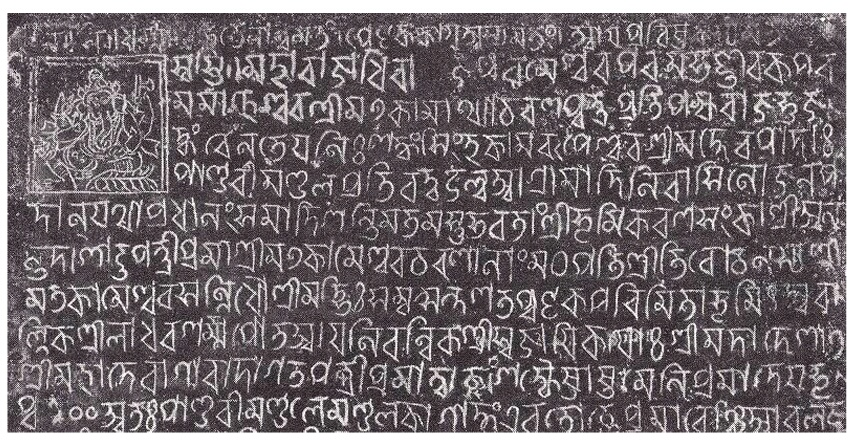
14th/15th century Copperplate inscription of Nilachal King Madhavadeva shows the script used when Early Assamese was spoken in the period of 14th-15th century.

Early Assamese was written in the Eastern Nagari script.

== Morphology and Grammar ==
=== Pronouns ===
Person	Singular nominative	Singular oblique	Plural nominative	Plural oblique
1st	mai, maĩ, āmi	mo-, moho-	āmi, āmarā	āmā-, āmhā-, āmāsā-
2nd informal	tai, taĩ	to-, toho-	torā	torā-
2nd familiar	tumi	tomā-, tomhā	tomarā	tomāsā-
3rd inf., prox., m.	i, ito	ihā-, ā-	ārā	ārā-, esambā-
3rd inf. dist. f.	ei	ei-	ārā	ārā-, esambā-
3rd hon., prox.	ehe, eho		ehante, ehanto	esambā-
3rd inf., dist., m.	si, sito	tā-, tāhā-	tārā	tārā-, tāsambā-
3rd inf. dist. f.	tāi	tāi-		
3rd hon. dist.	tehõ, tehẽ, tehã		tehante, tehento, tesambe	tāsambā-
