= Bhattadeva =

Assamese prose writer, translator, and Sanskrit scholar (1558–1638)

Baikunthanatha Bhagavata Bhattacharya
- Born: Baikunthanatha Bhattacharya; 23 March 1558; Bichankuchi, Bajali, Barpeta, Assam (India)
- Died: 3 January 1638 (aged 79); Byaskuchi, Barpeta.
- Occupation: Litterateur
- Writing career
- Pen name: Bhattadeva
- Language: Assamese language of Early Assamese
- Period: Mediaeval period
- Notable works: Katha Bhagavata, Katha Gita, Katha Ratnavali, Bhakti Viveka (Sanskrit)

Bhattadeva (1558–1638), (full name, Baikunthanatha Bhagavata Bhattacharya) is acknowledged as the father of Assamese prose. Though Bhaktiratnakar-katha, the Assamese translation of Sankardev's Sanskrit composition Bhaktiratnakar by Gopala Charana Dwija preceded the works of Bhattadeva, Bhattadeva's prose had an influence in the development of a high and dignified style. Bhattadeva's and Gopala Charana Dvija's 16th century works are considered to be the earliest examples of prose in Indian languages. Bhattadeva's erudition in Sanskrit grammar and literature, and his command over the Bhagavata earned him the title of Bhagavata Bhattacharya.

== Biography ==
Bhattadeva was born to Chandra Bharati and Tara Devi in a Brahmin family of Bichankuchi, Bajali (Kamrup). After finishing his education, he became a disciple of Damodara Deva and succeeded him as the head of Patbausi satra at Barpeta. He established the Byaskuchi satra some time later where he died. He is best known for Katha Bhagavat and Katha Gita, though some minor works like Saranamalika and Prasangamala are also ascribed to him.

== Work ==
Bhattadeva began translating the Sanskrit Bhagavata into Assamese prose at the bidding of Damodaradeva, who wanted it to be accessible to the common man. He rendered Katha Bhagavata in a discursive style that is dignified and balanced. He maintains the same sense of dialogue in the Katha Gita. Though he uses short sentences, popular vocabulary and the expressive cadence of the colloquial, he uses Sanskrit vocables heavily and his language is an elevated one. After completing the Bhagavata and the Gita, he rendered the Bhaktiratnavali into elegant prose. He also compiled a book of devotional verses in Sanskrit gleaned from the Upanishads, Puranas and Samhitas illustrating all the elements of Bhakti. The work, Bhakti-Viveka reveals extensive knowledge and erudition of Bhattadeva, from the vedic to the puranic literature. Bhattadeva's contributions are not confined to prose literature, he wrote poetry also.

Bhattadev University of Assam is named after him.

== See also ==
- Hema Saraswati
- Haribara Vipra

== Bibliography ==
- Barua, B. K. (1953), "Early Assamese Prose", in Kakati, Banikanta (ed.), Aspects of Early Assamese Literature, Gauhati: Gauhati University
- Goswami, Upendranath (1970), A Study on Kamrupi: A Dialect of Assamese, Gauhati: Department of Historical and Antiquarian Studies
- Saikia, Nagen (1997), "Assamese", in Paniker, K. Ayyappa (ed.), Medieval Indian Literature, vol. 1, New Delhi: Sahitya Akademi, pp. 3–20
- Sarma, Satyendranath (1987), "Bhattacharya, Baikunthanatha Bhagavata", in Dutta, Amaresh (ed.), Encyclopaedia of Indian Literature, New Delhi: Sahitya Akademi
