= Bhusana Dvija =

- Born: January 1508; Dihga Nagara, Barnagar, Barpeta, Kamrup
- Died: 1577 (aged 68–69)
- Occupation: Litterateur
- Writing career
- Language: Early Assamese
- Notable works: Guru Charit, Sankara Charit

Bhusana Dvija (Born 1508 CE) was litterateur born in Dihga Nagara, Barnagar, Barpeta, Kamrup. He was specially known for his biographies named Guru Charita and Sankara Charita.

Bhusana Dvija was grandson of Chakrapani who was disciple of Sankardeva. He compiled Sankara charita with accounts mostly left by his ancestors of life of Sankardeva.

== See also ==
- Bakul Kayastha
- Haribara Vipra
