= Madhava Kandali =

14th century Assamese poet

- Writing career
- Language: Assamese (Early form)
- Period: mid 1300s
- Notable work: Saptakanda Ramayana

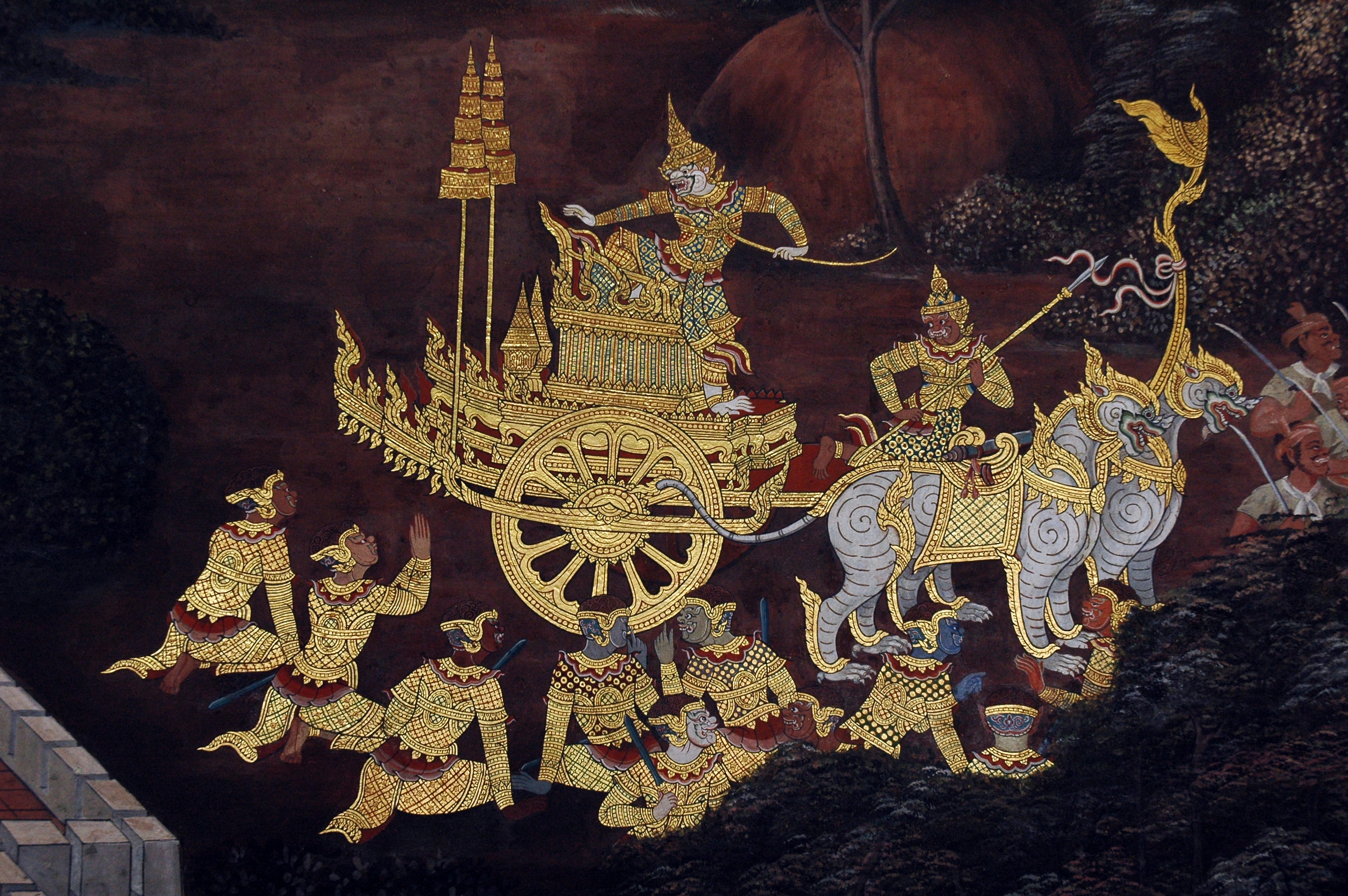
Scene from the Ramakien (Thai Ramayana) depicted on a mural at Wat Phra Kaew (Temple of the Emerald Buddha), Bangkok, Thailand.

Kaviraja Madhava Kandali (circa. 14th century) was an Indian poet from the state of Assam. He is one of the renowned poets pertaining to the Pre-Shankara era. His Saptakanda Ramayana is considered the earliest translation of the Ramayana into an Indo-Aryan language, Assamese. This work was carried out by the poet as early as the 14th Century. Another significant work of his is the narrative poem Devajit, which is about superiority of Krishna over the other avatars of Vishnu. Kandali's patron was the Kachari King of Barāha lineage Mahamanikya (mid 14th century) whose kingdom was located in the Kapili valley. Kabiraja Madhava Kandali was said to be inhabitant of Lanka of Undivided Nagaon.

== Literary works ==
=== Saptakanda Ramayana ===
Madhava Kandali is credited with the task of translating ‘Valmiki’s Ramayana into the Assamese language as early as the 14th century. The Assamese version of Ramayana conceptualized by Madhava Kandali is the first of its kind among all the regional languages of North and Northeast India. Although Madhava Kandali has written that “Saptakanda Ramayana podebandhi nibandhilo lambha parihari sarodhrite”, yet the “Adikanda” (first) and the “Uttarakanda” (last) cantos of his “Saptakanda” (seven cantos) Ramayana are not found. Therefore, in accordance with the advice of Mahapurush Srimanta Shankardeva, Mahapurush Madhavdev wrote “Adikanda” and Mahapurush Srimanta Shankardeva, wrote the “Uttarakanda” in order to compensate the lost cantos and thus completed the epic consisting of “Sapta Kanda” or seven cantos. Madhava Kandali has not translated the “Shlokas” (a couplet of Sanskrit verse) of valmiki Ramayana as it is. He instead abandoned some unnecessary verse narratives and long descriptive passages. He has written the Assamese Ramayana in a lucid and rhythmic pattern thus catering to the needs of the common Assamese people.He has also provided explanations for his inclusion of non-valmiki elements while composing the epic.

Srimanta Shankardeva designated him as Purva Kobi Apramadi (Peerless Bard of the Eastern Region). Moreover, Madhab Kandali is often acclaimed to be the “Kalidas of Assam”.

=== Devajit ===
Madhava Kandali is also credited to be the composer of another poetical work ‘Devajit’ where he portrays Lord Krishna as the greatest incarnation (avatar) of Lord Bishnu.

== Musical instruments ==
He lists several instruments in his "Ramayana", such as mardala(a type of wooden Mridanga), khumuchi, bhemachi, dagar, gratal, ramtal, tabal, jhajhar, jinjiri, bheri mahari, tokari, dosari, kendara, dotara, vina, bīn, vipanchi, etc. (meaning that these instruments existed since his time in 14th century or earlier).

== Sources ==
- Goswami, Indira (1996). Ramayana from Ganga to Brahmaputra. B.R. Pub. Corp. ISBN 81-7018-858-X
- Kandali, Madhava.Saptakanda Ramayana, (in Assamese). Banalata.
- Sarma, Satyendranath. (1976). Assamese literature. Harrassowitz. ISBN 3447017368.

== Bibliography ==
- Thakuria, Gitanjali (2015). "SURVEY OF THE INSCRIPTIONS AND THEIR TECHNICAL ASPECTS". Studies in the inscriptions of medieval assam (PhD). Guwahati University. hdl:10603/50862.
