= Harivara Vipra =

- Occupation: Court poet
- Writing career
- Language: Assamese

Harivara Vipra is amongst the earliest known Assamese writers. He was patronaged by Kamatapur's king Durlava Narayan. His compositions, Babrubahanar Yudha, Lava-Kushar Yudha, Tamradwajar Yudha of (Asvamedha Parva) are taken from Jyimiyanashamedh. His writing style, simple interpretation and use of ornamental words are counted after his concurrent Madhava Kandali's. His other concurrent Pre-Vaishnavite writers are Rudra Kandali, Kobiranta Saraswati, Madhav Kandali, Hema Saraswati etc., who gave a strong initial base to Assamese Literature.
