= Hema Saraswati =

Hema Saraswati was amongst the earliest known Assamese writers, most known for his poem, Prahlada Charita, the earliest known poetic work in Assamese language. He was court poet under the patronage of Kamtapur's King Durlabh Narayan of Kamata Kingdom, who also provided patronage to his contemporary, Harivara Vipra. He wrote Prahlada Charita based on a story found in Vayu Purana and Har-Gauri-Sambaad, a version of Kumarasambhava by Kalidasa.

His concurrent writers are Rudra Kandali, Madhav Kandali, Horibor Bipro etc., who gave a strong initial base to Assamese Literature.
