= List of villages in Nalbari district =

List of villages in Nalbari district, Assam, India

This is a list of villages in Nalbari district, an administrative district in the state of Assam, India. Dihjari laxmi puja is celebrated in the month of October every year in the laxmi mandir of Dihjari .Bonbhag Khata Dihjari Highschool is most prominent school in the region .

== Bllelbeli, Nalbari ==
Villages in Pub Nalbari Block
| Gram Panchayat name | District | | |
| Barkhanjan | Pub Nalbari | No Khata | Nalbari |
| Barpipalia | Pub Nalbari | No Khata | Nalbari |
| Bhutkatara | Pub Nalbari | No Khata | Nalbari |
| Bistupur | Pub Nalbari | No Khata | Nalbari |
| Deharkuchi | Pub Nalbari | No Khata | Nalbari |
| Gobindapur | Pub Nalbari | No Khata | Nalbari |
| Jajiabari | Pub Nalbari | No Khata | Nalbari |
| Jamtola | Pub Nalbari | No Khata | Nalbari |
| Katahkuchi | Pub Nalbari | No Khata | Nalbari |
| Kendukuchi | Pub Nalbari | No Khata | Nalbari |
| Khat Katara | Pub Nalbari | No Khata | Nalbari |
| Khudra Chenikuchi | Pub Nalbari | No Khata | Nalbari |
| Khudra Pipalia | Pub Nalbari | No Khata | Nalbari |
| Nankarbhaira | Pub Nalbari | No Khata | Nalbari |
| Sahpur | Pub Nalbari | No Khata | Nalbari |
| Balikuchi | Pub Nalbari | No Khata | Nalbari |
| Balilecha | Pub Nalbari | No Khata | Nalbari |
| Barmurikona | Pub Nalbari | No Khata | Nalbari |
| Dhamdhama | Pub Nalbari | No Khata | Nalbari |
| Kardoitola | Pub Nalbari | No Khata | Nalbari |
| Namdonga | Pub Nalbari | No Khata | Nalbari |
| Pajipar | Pub Nalbari | No Khata | Nalbari |
| Parowa | Pub Nalbari | No Khata | Nalbari |
| Tantra Sankara | Pub Nalbari | No Khata | Nalbari |
| Terechia | Pub Nalbari | No Khata | Nalbari |
| Balakuchi | Pub Nalbari | No Khata | Nalbari |
| Bar Chenikuchi | Pub Nalbari | No Khata | Nalbari |
| Guakuchi | Pub Nalbari | No Khata | Nalbari |
| Paikarkuchi | Pub Nalbari | No Khata | Nalbari |
| Paila | Pub Nalbari | No Khata | Nalbari |
| Porakuchi | Pub Nalbari | No Khata | Nalbari |
| Sondha | Pub Nalbari | No Khata | Nalbari |
| Sandha Kairara | Pub Nalbari | No Khata | Nalbari |
| Balikaria Kharjara | Pub Nalbari | No Khata | Nalbari |
| Digheli | Pub Nalbari | No Khata | Nalbari |
| Japarkuchi | Pub Nalbari | No Khata | Nalbari |
| Jaymongla | Pub Nalbari | No Khata | Nalbari |
| Khudra Sankara | Pub Nalbari | No Khata | Nalbari |
| Majdia | Pub Nalbari | No Khata | Nalbari |
| Nalbari Gaon | Pub Nalbari | No Khata | Nalbari |
| Bar Agra | Pub Nalbari | No Batahgila | Nalbari |
| Bhuyarkuchi | Pub Nalbari | No Batahgila | Nalbari |
| Chengnoi | Pub Nalbari | No Batahgila | Nalbari |
| Dhantola | Pub Nalbari | No Batahgila | Nalbari |
| Garemara | Pub Nalbari | No Batahgila | Nalbari |
| Katla Barkuchi | Pub Nalbari | No Batahgila | Nalbari |
| Khudra Agra | Pub Nalbari | No Batahgila | Nalbari |
| Khudra Katla Barkuchi | Pub Nalbari | No Batahgila | Nalbari |
| Khudra Katra | Pub Nalbari | No Batahgila | Nalbari |
| Mairadonga | Pub Nalbari | No Batahgila | Nalbari |
| Namati Niz Batahgila | Pub Nalbari | No Batahgila | Nalbari |
| Pitipara | Pub Nalbari | No Batahgila | Nalbari |
| Balikaria | Pub Nalbari | No Paschim Batahgila | Nalbari |
| Bardhantoli | Pub Nalbari | No Paschim Batahgila | Nalbari |
| Barkura | Pub Nalbari | No Paschim Batahgila | Nalbari |
| Barsarkuchi | Pub Nalbari | No Paschim Batahgila | Nalbari |
| Dhekiabari | Pub Nalbari | No Paschim Batahgila | Nalbari |
| Haripur | Pub Nalbari | No Paschim Batahgila | Nalbari |
| Sariahtali | Pub Nalbari | No Paschim Batahgila | Nalbari |
| Alengidal | Pub Nalbari | No Pub Bahjani | Nalbari |
| Amayapur | Pub Nalbari | No Pub Bahjani | Nalbari |
| Arara | Pub Nalbari | No Pub Bahjani | Nalbari |
| Bhadra | Pub Nalbari | No Pub Bahjani | Nalbari |
| Mugkuchi | Pub Nalbari | No Pub Bahjani | Nalbari |
| Nandagaon | Pub Nalbari | No Pub Bahjani | Nalbari |
| Tilana | Pub Nalbari | No Pub Bahjani | Nalbari |
| Bar Azara | Pub Nalbari | No Uttar Bahjani | Nalbari |
| Chandkuchi | Pub Nalbari | No Uttar Bahjani | Nalbari |
| Dakhin Bezera | Pub Nalbari | No Uttar Bahjani | Nalbari |
| Dowkuchi | Pub Nalbari | No Uttar Bahjani | Nalbari |
| Janigog | Pub Nalbari | No Uttar Bahjani | Nalbari |
| Madan Mohan Sakhowa | Pub Nalbari | No Uttar Bahjani | Nalbari |
| Budrukuchi | Pub Nalbari | No Madhya Bahjani | Nalbari |
| Khudra Sankara | Pub Nalbari | No Madhya Bahjani | Nalbari |
| Niz Bahjani | Pub Nalbari | No Madhya Bahjani | Nalbari |
| Charabari | Pub Nalbari | No Dakhin Bahjani | Nalbari |
| Deharkalakuchi | Pub Nalbari | No Dakhin Bahjani | Nalbari |
| Jaha | Pub Nalbari | No Dakhin Bahjani | Nalbari |
| Kumrikata | Pub Nalbari | No Dakhin Bahjani | Nalbari |
| Madhapur | Pub Nalbari | No Dakhin Bahjani | Nalbari |
| Makaldoba | Pub Nalbari | No Dakhin Bahjani | Nalbari |
| Paschim Khatar Kalakuchi | Pub Nalbari | No Dakhin Bahjani | Nalbari |
| Pub Kalakuchi | Pub Nalbari | No Dakhin Bahjani | Nalbari |
| Charia | Pub Nalbari | No Dakhin Bahjani | Nalbari |

== Borigog Banbhag ==
Villages in Borigog Banbhag Block
| Name of Village | Block name | Gram Panchayat name | District |
|---|---|---|---|
| Barkhala | Borigog Banbhag | No Deharkuchi | Nalbari |
| Chatama | Borigog Banbhag | No Deharkuchi | Nalbari |
| Deharkuchi | Borigog Banbhag | No Deharkuchi | Nalbari |
| Kismat | Borigog Banbhag | No Deharkuchi | Nalbari |
| Larma Batakuchi | Borigog Banbhag | No Deharkuchi | Nalbari |
| Purna Daichapra | Borigog Banbhag | No Deharkuchi | Nalbari |
| Purna Kamdev | Borigog Banbhag | No Deharkuchi | Nalbari |
| Amara | Borigog Banbhag | No Datara | Nalbari |
| Bardhanara no-1 | Borigog Banbhag | No Datara | Nalbari |
| Bardhanara no-2 | Borigog Banbhag | No Datara | Nalbari |
| Borigaon | Borigog Banbhag | No Datara | Nalbari |
| Datara | Borigog Banbhag | No Datara | Nalbari |
| Dhurkuchi | Borigog Banbhag | No Datara | Nalbari |
| Kathora | Borigog Banbhag | No Datara | Nalbari |
| Kundargaon | Borigog Banbhag | No Datara | Nalbari |
| Napara | Borigog Banbhag | No Datara | Nalbari |
| Thanpatkuchi | Borigog Banbhag | No Datara | Nalbari |
| Baghmara | Borigog Banbhag | No Ghagrapar | Nalbari |
| Barjarbrihati | Borigog Banbhag | No Datara | Nalbari |
| Bhanukuchi | Borigog Banbhag | No Datara | Nalbari |
| Bilpar | Borigog Banbhag | No Datara | Nalbari |
| Burburi | Borigog Banbhag | No Datara | Nalbari |
| Chatra | Borigog Banbhag | No Datara | Nalbari |
| Chenikuchi | Borigog Banbhag | No Datara | Nalbari |
| Chilling | Borigog Banbhag | No Datara | Nalbari |
| Gatiyan | Borigog Banbhag | No Datara | Nalbari |
| Katakiya | Borigog Banbhag | No Datara | Nalbari |
| Katuriya | Borigog Banbhag | No Datara | Nalbari |
| Kayejeni | Borigog Banbhag | No Datara | Nalbari |
| Kundargaon | Borigog Banbhag | No Datara | Nalbari |
| Jabrihati | Borigog Banbhag | No Datara | Nalbari |
| Narikuchi | Borigog Banbhag | No Datara | Nalbari |
| Nimua Latima no-1 | Borigog Banbhag | No Datara | Nalbari |
| Nimua Latima no-2 | Borigog Banbhag | No Datara | Nalbari |
| Niz Borigog | Borigog Banbhag | No Datara | Nalbari |
| Niz Khagta | Borigog Banbhag | No Datara | Nalbari |
| Patkata | Borigog Banbhag | No Datara | Nalbari |
| Akna | Borigog Banbhag | No Pub Banbhag | Nalbari |
| Barajol | Borigog Banbhag | No Pub Banbhag | Nalbari |
| Dalua | Borigog Banbhag | No Pub Banbhag | Nalbari |
| Ghongarkuchi | Borigog Banbhag | No Pub Banbhag | Nalbari |
| Jabjabkuchi | Borigog Banbhag | No Pub Banbhag | Nalbari |
| Kayakuchi | Borigog Banbhag | No Pub Banbhag | Nalbari |
| Majarbari | Borigog Banbhag | No Pub Banbhag | Nalbari |
| Poichara | Borigog Banbhag | No Pub Banbhag | Nalbari |
| Ponar Kauniya | Borigog Banbhag | No Pub Banbhag | Nalbari |
| Rampur Azagara | Borigog Banbhag | No Pub Banbhag | Nalbari |
| Sathamow | Borigog Banbhag | No Pub Banbhag | Nalbari |
| Barbistupur | Borigog Banbhag | No Dihjari | Nalbari |
| Barghopa | Borigog Banbhag | No Dihjari | Nalbari |
| Dihjari | Borigog Banbhag | No Dihjari | Nalbari |
| Ghohkuchi | Borigog Banbhag | No Dihjari | Nalbari |
| Hablakha | Borigog Banbhag | No Dihjari | Nalbari |
| Jugurkuchi Sripur | Borigog Banbhag | No Dihjari | Nalbari |
| Keherua | Borigog Banbhag | No Dihjari | Nalbari |
| Khudra Bistupur | Borigog Banbhag | No Dihjari | Nalbari |
| Nilpur | Borigog Banbhag | No Dihjari | Nalbari |
| Sagarkuchi no- 1 | Borigog Banbhag | No Dihjari | Nalbari |
| Sagarkuchi no- 2 | Borigog Banbhag | No Dihjari | Nalbari |
| Sagarkuchi no- 3 | Borigog Banbhag | No Dihjari | Nalbari |
| Sagarkuchi no- 4 | Borigog Banbhag | No Dihjari | Nalbari |
| Sahan Bistupur | Borigog Banbhag | No Dihjari | Nalbari |
| Balipara | Borigog Banbhag | No Khatikuchi | Nalbari |
| Barbhag Nalbari | Borigog Banbhag | No Khatikuchi | Nalbari |
| Bhadra Bangal | Borigog Banbhag | No Khatikuchi | Nalbari |
| Bhitha Mahal | Borigog Banbhag | No Khatikuchi | Nalbari |
| Dalbari Kaniha | Borigog Banbhag | No Khatikuchi | Nalbari |
| Khatikychi | Borigog Banbhag | No Khatikuchi | Nalbari |
| Panbari | Borigog Banbhag | No Khatikuchi | Nalbari |
| Panimajkuchi | Borigog Banbhag | No Khatikuchi | Nalbari |
| Paschim Nalbari | Borigog Banbhag | No Khatikuchi | Nalbari |
| Pub Barsiral | Borigog Banbhag | No Khatikuchi | Nalbari |
| Sonkuriha | Borigog Banbhag | No Khatikuchi | Nalbari |
| Arara | Borigog Banbhag | No Alliya | Nalbari |
| Bangaon | Borigog Banbhag | No Alliya | Nalbari |
| Baralkuchi | Borigog Banbhag | No Alliya | Nalbari |
| Choto Alliya | Borigog Banbhag | No Alliya | Nalbari |
| Gargari | Borigog Banbhag | No Alliya | Nalbari |
| Madhapur | Borigog Banbhag | No Alliya | Nalbari |
| Namati | Borigog Banbhag | No Alliya | Nalbari |
| Narayangaon | Borigog Banbhag | No Alliya | Nalbari |
| Balitara no-1 | Borigog Banbhag | No Balitara | Nalbari |
| Balitara no-2 | Borigog Banbhag | No Balitara | Nalbari |
| Balitara no-3 | Borigog Banbhag | No Balitara | Nalbari |
| Balitara no-4 | Borigog Banbhag | No Balitara | Nalbari |
| Hahdoli | Borigog Banbhag | No Balitara | Nalbari |
| Nagaon | Borigog Banbhag | No Balitara | Nalbari |
| Naherbari | Borigog Banbhag | No Balitara | Nalbari |
| Bhelamari | Borigog Banbhag | No Chataibari | Nalbari |
| Chataibari | Borigog Banbhag | No Chataibari | Nalbari |
| Maju Siral | Borigog Banbhag | No Chataibari | Nalbari |
| Mohina | Borigog Banbhag | No Chataibari | Nalbari |
| Niz Dhamdhama | Borigog Banbhag | No Chataibari | Nalbari |
| Rangafali | Borigog Banbhag | No Chataibari | Nalbari |

== Paschim Nalbari ==
Villages in Paschim Nalbari block
| Name of Village | Block name | Gram Panchayat name | District |
|---|---|---|---|
| Piplibari | Paschim Nalbari | No Pub Khetri Dharmapur | Nalbari |
| Solmari | Paschim Nalbari | no khatikuchi | Nalbari |
| Amani | Paschim Nalbari | No Uttar Khetri Dharmapur | Nalbari |
| Kathala | Paschim Nalbari | No Pub Khetri Dharmapur | Nalbari |
| Kendubari | Paschim Nalbari | No Pub Khetri Dharmapur | Nalbari |
| Lokhopur | Paschim Nalbari | No Pub Khetri Dharmapur | Nalbari |
| Pokhura | Paschim Nalbari | No Pub Khetri Dharmapur | Nalbari |
| Bori | Paschim Nalbari | No Dakhin Khetri Dharmapur | Nalbari |
| Dahudi | Paschim Nalbari | No Dakhin Khetri Dharmapur | Nalbari |
| Niz Tapa | Paschim Nalbari | No Dakhin Khetri Dharmapur | Nalbari |
| Thuthikata | Paschim Nalbari | No Dakhin Khetri Dharmapur | Nalbari |
| Bar Helecha | Paschim Nalbari | No Pachim Khetri Dharmapur | Nalbari |
| Ghilajari | Paschim Nalbari | No Pachim Khetri Dharmapur | Nalbari |
| Kaihati | Paschim Nalbari | No Pachim Khetri Dharmapur | Nalbari |
| Khelua | Paschim Nalbari | No Pachim Khetri Dharmapur | Nalbari |
| Sukekuchi | Paschim Nalbari | No Pachim Khetri Dharmapur | Nalbari |
| Chamata | Paschim Nalbari | No Dakhin Madhya Dharmapur | Nalbari |
| Gandhuya | Paschim Nalbari | No Dakhin Madhya Dharmapur | Nalbari |
| Khata Rupiya Bathan | Paschim Nalbari | No Rupiyabathan | Nalbari |
| Rupiya Bathan | Paschim Nalbari | No Rupiyabathan | Nalbari |
| Bangaon | Paschim Nalbari | No Bangaon | Nalbari |
| Bihampur | Paschim Nalbari | No Bangaon | Nalbari |
| Khudra Khetri Barni | Paschim Nalbari | No Bangaon | Nalbari |
| Simaliya | Paschim Nalbari | No Bangaon | Nalbari |
| Niz Pokowa | Paschim Nalbari | No Panigaon | Nalbari |
| Panigaon | Paschim Nalbari | No Panigaon | Nalbari |
| Sandheli | Paschim Nalbari | No Panigaon | Nalbari |
| Barnarddi | Paschim Nalbari | No Barnaddi | Nalbari |
| Churchuri | Paschim Nalbari | No Barnaddi | Nalbari |
| Mohkhali | Paschim Nalbari | No Barnaddi | Nalbari |
| Barkhetri Barni | Paschim Nalbari | No Dakhin Pakowa | Nalbari |
| Billeswar | Paschim Nalbari | No Dakhin Pakowa | Nalbari |
| Nalicha | Paschim Nalbari | No Dakhin Pakowa | Nalbari |
| Jagra | Paschim Nalbari | No Dakhin Pakowa | Nalbari |
| Bogrihati | Paschim Nalbari | No Dakhin Pakowa | Nalbari |
| Batsor | Paschim Nalbari | No Dakhin Pakowa | Nalbari |
| Bhoirakhol | Paschim Nalbari | No Dakhin Pakowa | Nalbari |
| Dangardi | Paschim Nalbari | No Dakhin Pakowa | Nalbari |
| Dehar Balowa | Paschim Nalbari | No Dakhin Pakowa | Nalbari |
| Gadira | Paschim Nalbari | No Dakhin Pakowa | Nalbari |
| Gangapur | Paschim Nalbari | No Dakhin Pakowa | Nalbari |
| Goalpara | Paschim Nalbari | No Dakhin Pakowa | Nalbari |
| Khakrisal | Paschim Nalbari | No Dakhin Pakowa | Nalbari |
| Kutnikuchi | Paschim Nalbari | No Dakhin Pakowa | Nalbari |
| Larakuchi | Paschim Nalbari | No Dakhin Pakowa | Nalbari |
| Mohbiyani | Paschim Nalbari | No Dakhin Pakowa | Nalbari |
| Belsor | Paschim Nalbari | No Belsor | Nalbari |
| Kakaya | Paschim Nalbari | No Kakaya | Nalbari |

== Madhupur ==
Villages in Madhupur block
| Name of Village | Block name | Gram Panchayat name | District |
|---|---|---|---|
| Bechimari | Madhupur | No Paschim Dharmapur | Nalbari |
| Kaithalkuchi | Madhupur | No Paschim Dharmapur | Nalbari |
| Nadala | Madhupur | No Paschim Dharmapur | Nalbari |
| Sandheli | Madhupur | No Paschim Dharmapur | Nalbari |
| Gamarimuri | Madhupur | No Pub Dharmapur | Nalbari |
| Jowarddi | Madhupur | No Pub Dharmapur | Nalbari |
| Pohlongpara | Madhupur | No Pub Dharmapur | Nalbari |
| Balijhar | Madhupur | No Uttar Pub Dharmapur | Nalbari |
| Bausipara | Madhupur | No Uttar Pub Dharmapur | Nalbari |
| Bihampur | Madhupur | No Uttar Pub Dharmapur | Nalbari |
| Kharsitha | Madhupur | No Uttar Pub Dharmapur | Nalbari |
| Khata Nambarbhag | Madhupur | No Uttar Pub Dharmapur | Nalbari |
| Madhupur | Madhupur | No Uttar Pub Dharmapur | Nalbari |
| Niz Mularkuchi | Madhupur | No Uttar Pub Dharmapur | Nalbari |
| Phulguri | Madhupur | No Uttar Pub Dharmapur | Nalbari |
| Banbhag Solmari | Madhupur | No Paschim Natun Dehar | Nalbari |
| Bangnabari | Madhupur | No Paschim Natun Dehar | Nalbari |
| Kathalbari | Madhupur | No Paschim Natun Dehar | Nalbari |
| Khukhundi | Madhupur | No Paschim Natun Dehar | Nalbari |
| Toumura | Madhupur | No Paschim Natun Dehar | Nalbari |
| Kachimpur | Madhupur | No Pub Natun Dehar | Nalbari |
| Kendukuchi | Madhupur | No Pub Natun Dehar | Nalbari |
| Saplekuchi | Madhupur | No Pub Natun Dehar | Nalbari |
| Barkhetri Banekuchi | Madhupur | No Paschim Natun Dehar | Nalbari |
| Barnagar Banekuchi | Madhupur | No Paschim Natun Dehar | Nalbari |
| Burinagar | Madhupur | No Paschim Natun Dehar | Nalbari |
| Danguapara | Madhupur | No Paschim Natun Dehar | Nalbari |
| Niz Banekuchi | Madhupur | No Paschim Natun Dehar | Nalbari |
| Rajakhat Banekuchi | Madhupur | No Paschim Natun Dehar | Nalbari |

== Tihu ==
Villages in Tihu block
| Name of Village | Block name | Gram Panchayat name | District |
|---|---|---|---|
| Bar Makhibaha | Tihu | No Makhibaha | Nalbari |
| Kshudra Makhibaha | Tihu | No Makhibaha | Nalbari |
| Saktipara | Tihu | No Makhibaha | Nalbari |
| Bhatuakhana | Tihu | No Jalkhana Bhatuakhana | Nalbari |
| Jalkhana | Tihu | No Jalkhana Bhatuakhana | Nalbari |
| Nannattari | Tihu | No Jalkhana Bhatuakhana | Nalbari |
| Niz Khanna | Tihu | No Jalkhana Bhatuakhana | Nalbari |
| Parmankhowa | Tihu | No Jalkhana Bhatuakhana | Nalbari |
| Barbari | Tihu | No Mathurapur | Nalbari |
| Bargain | Tihu | No Mathurapur | Nalbari |
| Mathurapur | Tihu | No Mathurapur | Nalbari |
| Nakhara | Tihu | No Mathurapur | Nalbari |
| Piplibari | Tihu | No Mathurapur | Nalbari |
| Ranakuchi | Tihu | No Mathurapur | Nalbari |
| Ratanpur | Tihu | No Mathurapur | Nalbari |
| Bamonbari | Tihu | No Nathkuchi | Nalbari |
| Bhurkuchi | Tihu | No Nathkuchi | Nalbari |
| Dolaigaon | Tihu | No Nathkuchi | Nalbari |
| Nathkuchi no-1 | Tihu | No Nathkuchi | Nalbari |
| Nathkuchi no-2 | Tihu | No Nathkuchi | Nalbari |
| Niz Namati | Tihu | No Nathkuchi | Nalbari |
| Bali | Tihu | No Paschim Nambarbhag | Nalbari |
| Bhojkuchi | Tihu | No Paschim Nambarbhag | Nalbari |
| Haribhanga | Tihu | No Paschim Nambarbhag | Nalbari |
| Akhara | Tihu | No Pub Nambarbhag | Nalbari |
| Bakuajari | Tihu | No Pub Nambarbhag | Nalbari |
| Barbhagjari | Tihu | No Pub Nambarbhag | Nalbari |
| Barjhar | Tihu | No Pub Nambarbhag | Nalbari |
| Dahkania | Tihu | No Pub Nambarbhag | Nalbari |
| Dipta | Tihu | No Pub Nambarbhag | Nalbari |
| Gobaradal | Tihu | No Pub Nambarbhag | Nalbari |
| Sathikuchi | Tihu | No Pub Nambarbhag | Nalbari |
| Suradi | Tihu | No Pub Nambarbhag | Nalbari |

== Barbhag ==
Villages in Barbhag block
| Name of Village | Block name | Gram Panchayat name | District |
|---|---|---|---|
| Bajali Udaypur | Barbhag | No Upar Barbhag | Nalbari |
| Bangalmur | Barbhag | No Upar Barbhag | Nalbari |
| Bar Kulhati | Barbhag | No Upar Barbhag | Nalbari |
| Barbarara | Barbhag | No Upar Barbhag | Nalbari |
| Bausi Udaypur | Barbhag | No Upar Barbhag | Nalbari |
| Boridatara | Barbhag | No Upar Barbhag | Nalbari |
| Jugurkuchi | Barbhag | No Upar Barbhag | Nalbari |
| Khudra Kulhati | Barbhag | No Upar Barbhag | Nalbari |
| Nanoi | Barbhag | No Upar Barbhag | Nalbari |
| Pajipar | Barbhag | No Upar Barbhag | Nalbari |
| Panbari | Barbhag | No Upar Barbhag | Nalbari |
| Ranakuchi | Barbhag | No Upar Barbhag | Nalbari |
| Saru Barara | Barbhag | No Upar Barbhag | Nalbari |
| Sonkani | Barbhag | No Upar Barbhag | Nalbari |
| Sonkuriha no-1 | Barbhag | No Upar Barbhag | Nalbari |
| Kalag | Barbhag | No Upar Barbhag | Nalbari |
| Kotalkuchi | Barbhag | No Upar Barbhag | Nalbari |
| Pandula | Barbhag | No Upar Barbhag | Nalbari |
| Ukhura | Barbhag | No Upar Barbhag | Nalbari |
| Arangmou | Barbhag | No Upar Barbhag | Nalbari |
| Dokoha | Barbhag | No Upar Barbhag | Nalbari |
| Kamarkuchi | Barbhag | No Upar Barbhag | Nalbari |
| Kshudra Dingdingi | Barbhag | No Upar Barbhag | Nalbari |
| Nakheti | Barbhag | No Upar Barbhag | Nalbari |
| Raimadha | Barbhag | No Upar Barbhag | Nalbari |
| Raitkuchi | Barbhag | No Upar Barbhag | Nalbari |
| Bala | Barbhag | No Upar Barbhag | Nalbari |
| Bezkuchi | Barbhag | No Upar Barbhag | Nalbari |
| Bhabanipur | Barbhag | No Upar Barbhag | Nalbari |
| Jugarbari | Barbhag | No Upar Barbhag | Nalbari |
| Kahikuchi | Barbhag | No Upar Barbhag | Nalbari |
| Karia | Barbhag | No Upar Barbhag | Nalbari |
| Katpuha | Barbhag | No Upar Barbhag | Nalbari |
| Ulabari | Barbhag | No Upar Barbhag | Nalbari |
| Arikuchi | Barbhag | No Upar Barbhag | Nalbari |
| Dingdingi | Barbhag | No Upar Barbhag | Nalbari |
| Marowa | Barbhag | No Upar Barbhag | Nalbari |
| Tarmatha | Barbhag | No Upar Barbhag | Nalbari |
| Barkuriha | Barbhag | No Upar Barbhag | Nalbari |
| Dhaniagog | Barbhag | No Sanekuchi | Nalbari |
| Moura | Barbhag | No Sanekuchi | Nalbari |
| Porakuchi | Barbhag | No Sanekuchi | Nalbari |
| Simaliya | Barbhag | No Sanekuchi | Nalbari |
| Sonkuriha no-2 | Barbhag | No Sanekuchi | Nalbari |
| Athgaria | Barbhag | No Sanekuchi | Nalbari |
| Barbukia | Barbhag | No Sanekuchi | Nalbari |
| Bargacha | Barbhag | No Sanekuchi | Nalbari |
| Barsimaliya | Barbhag | No Sanekuchi | Nalbari |
| Samarkuchi | Barbhag | No Sanekuchi | Nalbari |
| Sanekuchi | Barbhag | No Sanekuchi | Nalbari |
| Uttarkuchi | Barbhag | No Sanekuchi | Nalbari |

== Barkhetri ==
Villages in Barkhetri block
| Name of Village | Block name | Gram Panchayat name | District |
|---|---|---|---|
| Bamondittari | Barkhetri | No Kekankuchi Kaplabari | Nalbari |
| Banpura | Barkhetri | No Kekankuchi Kaplabari | Nalbari |
| Bartola no-3 | Barkhetri | No Kekankuchi Kaplabari | Nalbari |
| Bartola no-4 | Barkhetri | No Kekankuchi Kaplabari | Nalbari |
| Domdoma Pathar | Barkhetri | No Kekankuchi Kaplabari | Nalbari |
| Gharuabaha Gaon | Barkhetri | No Kekankuchi Kaplabari | Nalbari |
| Kachuapathar | Barkhetri | No Kekankuchi Kaplabari | Nalbari |
| Kaldi | Barkhetri | No Kekankuchi Kaplabari | Nalbari |
| Kaplabari no-1 | Barkhetri | No Kekankuchi Kaplabari | Nalbari |
| Kaplabari no-2 | Barkhetri | No Kekankuchi Kaplabari | Nalbari |
| Kekankuchi no-1 | Barkhetri | No Kekankuchi Kaplabari | Nalbari |
| Kekankuchi no-2 | Barkhetri | No Kekankuchi Kaplabari | Nalbari |
| Khar Kaldi | Barkhetri | No Kekankuchi Kaplabari | Nalbari |
| Narua no-1 | Barkhetri | No Kekankuchi Kaplabari | Nalbari |
| Roumari Damdama | Barkhetri | No Kekankuchi Kaplabari | Nalbari |
| Ahta | Barkhetri | No Barnibari Naptipara | Nalbari |
| Bakrikuchi | Barkhetri | No Barnibari Naptipara | Nalbari |
| Barnibari | Barkhetri | No Barnibari Naptipara | Nalbari |
| Dirua | Barkhetri | No Barnibari Naptipara | Nalbari |
| Naptipara | Barkhetri | No Barnibari Naptipara | Nalbari |
| Paikan Bonmaja | Barkhetri | No Barnibari Naptipara | Nalbari |
| Paikan Dirua | Barkhetri | No Barnibari Naptipara | Nalbari |
| Amrattari | Barkhetri | No Mugdi Rampur | Nalbari |
| Bamon Angradi | Barkhetri | No Mugdi Rampur | Nalbari |
| Bamonbori | Barkhetri | No Mugdi Rampur | Nalbari |
| Garia Angradi | Barkhetri | No Mugdi Rampur | Nalbari |
| Gharuabaha Pathar | Barkhetri | No Mugdi Rampur | Nalbari |
| Ghorathal no-1 | Barkhetri | No Mugdi Rampur | Nalbari |
| Ghorathal no-2 | Barkhetri | No Mugdi Rampur | Nalbari |
| Kshudra Chinadi | Barkhetri | No Mugdi Rampur | Nalbari |
| Mugdi | Barkhetri | No Mugdi Rampur | Nalbari |
| Mulaghata | Barkhetri | No Mugdi Rampur | Nalbari |
| Narua no-2 | Barkhetri | No Mugdi Rampur | Nalbari |
| Rampur | Barkhetri | No Mugdi Rampur | Nalbari |
| Sidalkuchi Lachima | Barkhetri | No Mugdi Rampur | Nalbari |
| Balarchar | Barkhetri | No Daulashal Rampur | Nalbari |
| Belbeli | Barkhetri | No Jaysagar Bartala | Nalbari |
| Daulashal no-1 | Barkhetri | No Jaysagar Bartala | Nalbari |
| Daulashal no-2 | Barkhetri | No Jaysagar Bartala | Nalbari |
| Kalatoli | Barkhetri | No Jaysagar Bartala | Nalbari |
| Kalputa | Barkhetri | No Jaysagar Bartala | Nalbari |
| Khagrakati | Barkhetri | No Jaysagar Bartala | Nalbari |
| Larkuchi no-1 | Barkhetri | No Jaysagar Bartala | Nalbari |
| Larkuchi no-2 | Barkhetri | No Jaysagar Bartala | Nalbari |
| Larkuchi no-3 | Barkhetri | No Jaysagar Bartala | Nalbari |
| Madhya Kajia | Barkhetri | No Jaysagar Bartala | Nalbari |
| Nadia | Barkhetri | No Jaysagar Bartala | Nalbari |
| Paschim Kajia | Barkhetri | No Jaysagar Bartala | Nalbari |
| Peradhara | Barkhetri | No Jaysagar Bartala | Nalbari |
| Pub Kajia | Barkhetri | No Jaysagar Bartala | Nalbari |
| Barmara | Barkhetri | No Jaysagar Bartala | Nalbari |
| Bartola no -1 | Barkhetri | No Mukalmua Narayanpur | Nalbari |
| Bartola no-2 | Barkhetri | No Mukalmua Narayanpur | Nalbari |
| Batamara | Barkhetri | No Mukalmua Narayanpur | Nalbari |
| Bhelakhaiti | Barkhetri | No Mukalmua Narayanpur | Nalbari |
| Chanda | Barkhetri | No Mukalmua Narayanpur | Nalbari |
| Jaysagar no-1 | Barkhetri | No Mukalmua Narayanpur | Nalbari |
| Jaysagar no-2 | Barkhetri | No Mukalmua Narayanpur | Nalbari |
| Kalardia | Barkhetri | No Mukalmua Narayanpur | Nalbari |
| Sobhamari | Barkhetri | No Mukalmua Narayanpur | Nalbari |
| Tegheriattari | Barkhetri | No Mukalmua Narayanpur | Nalbari |
| Adattari | Barkhetri | No Mukalmua Narayanpur | Nalbari |
| Bhelamari no-1 | Barkhetri | No Mukalmua Narayanpur | Nalbari |
| Howlighat | Barkhetri | No Mukalmua Narayanpur | Nalbari |
| Lowthari | Barkhetri | No Mukalmua Narayanpur | Nalbari |
| Mukalmua | Barkhetri | No Mukalmua Narayanpur | Nalbari |
| Narayanpur | Barkhetri | No Mukalmua Narayanpur | Nalbari |
| Sapkata | Barkhetri | No Mukalmua Narayanpur | Nalbari |
| Baithabhanga | Barkhetri | No Kandhbari Dagapara | Nalbari |
| Balikuchi | Barkhetri | No Kandhbari Dagapara | Nalbari |
| Bardhap | Barkhetri | No Kandhbari Dagapara | Nalbari |
| Dagapara | Barkhetri | No Kandhbari Dagapara | Nalbari |
| Darangipara | Barkhetri | No Kandhbari Dagapara | Nalbari |
| Kandhbari | Barkhetri | No Kandhbari Dagapara | Nalbari |
| Khalihapara | Barkhetri | No Kandhbari Dagapara | Nalbari |
| Meruattari | Barkhetri | No Kandhbari Dagapara | Nalbari |
| Angradi | Barkhetri | No Ghoga | Nalbari |
| Badani Akhiya | Barkhetri | No Ghoga | Nalbari |
| Balattari no-1 | Barkhetri | No Ghoga | Nalbari |
| Balattari no-2 | Barkhetri | No Ghoga | Nalbari |
| Bhelamari no-3 | Barkhetri | No Ghoga | Nalbari |
| Ghoga | Barkhetri | No Ghoga | Nalbari |
| Hamlakur | Barkhetri | No Ghoga | Nalbari |
| Kaurkhaiti | Barkhetri | No Ghoga | Nalbari |
| Lawtolipara | Barkhetri | No Ghoga | Nalbari |
| Lowtola | Barkhetri | No Ghoga | Nalbari |
| Puran Akhiya | Barkhetri | No Ghoga | Nalbari |
| Satemari | Barkhetri | No Ghoga | Nalbari |
| Tilardia | Barkhetri | No Ghoga | Nalbari |
| Adabari | Barkhetri | No Loharkatha Adabari | Nalbari |
| Barluitpar | Barkhetri | No Loharkatha Adabari | Nalbari |
| Chakirghat | Barkhetri | No Loharkatha Adabari | Nalbari |
| Chungarbari | Barkhetri | No Loharkatha Adabari | Nalbari |
| Galdighla | Barkhetri | No Loharkatha Adabari | Nalbari |
| Hanapara | Barkhetri | No Loharkatha Adabari | Nalbari |
| Loharkatha | Barkhetri | No Loharkatha Adabari | Nalbari |
| Sutarkuchi | Barkhetri | No Loharkatha Adabari | Nalbari |
| Bangnaputa | Barkhetri | No Kalarchar | Nalbari |
| Kalarchar | Barkhetri | No Kalarchar | Nalbari |
| N.C Pub Kajia | Barkhetri | No Kalarchar | Nalbari |
| Barbala no-1 | Barkhetri | No Bhagnamari | Nalbari |
| Barbala no-3 | Barkhetri | No Bhagnamari | Nalbari |
| Barbala no-5 | Barkhetri | No Bhagnamari | Nalbari |
| Bhangnamari | Barkhetri | No Bhagnamari | Nalbari |
| Bhelamari no-2 | Barkhetri | No Bhagnamari | Nalbari |
| Bhelamari no-4 | Barkhetri | No Bhagnamari | Nalbari |
| Bhelengimari (Block-A) | Barkhetri | No Bhagnamari | Nalbari |
| Bhelengimari (Block-B) | Barkhetri | No Bhagnamari | Nalbari |
| Bhelengimari no-1 | Barkhetri | No Bhagnamari | Nalbari |
| Bhelengimari no-2 | Barkhetri | No Bhagnamari | Nalbari |
| Bhelengimari no-3 | Barkhetri | No Bhagnamari | Nalbari |
| Damal | Barkhetri | No Bhagnamari | Nalbari |
| Naparapam | Barkhetri | No Bhagnamari | Nalbari |
| Natun Chaprapara | Barkhetri | No Bhagnamari | Nalbari |
| Natun Chaprapara no-1 | Barkhetri | No Bhagnamari | Nalbari |
| Natun Chaprapara no-2 | Barkhetri | No Bhagnamari | Nalbari |
| Natun Chaprapara no-3 | Barkhetri | No Bhagnamari | Nalbari |
| Puran Chaprapara | Barkhetri | No Bhagnamari | Nalbari |
| Tupkarchar | Barkhetri | No Bhagnamari | Nalbari |
| Barbala no-2 | Barkhetri | No Kurihamari Barsulia | Nalbari |
| Barbala no-4 | Barkhetri | No Kurihamari Barsulia | Nalbari |
| Barsulia | Barkhetri | No Kurihamari Barsulia | Nalbari |
| Kurihamari | Barkhetri | No Kurihamari Barsulia | Nalbari |
| Sarusulia | Barkhetri | No Kurihamari Barsulia | Nalbari |

== See also ==
- Nalbari
