= Bahjani =

Settlement in India

- Mouza
- Map of Assam Bahjani (India)
- Coordinates: 26.387864°N 91.4217502°E
- Country: India
- State: Assam
- District: Nalbari
- Mouza: Bahjani

Population (2011)
  - Total: 47,696
- Postal code: 781334

Bahjani is an urban locality and mouza, in Nalbari district, Assam, India. Bahjani includes the Pub Bahjani, Uttar Bahjani, and Dakshin Bahjani areas, with a total of 25 villages. As per the 2001 census the Bahjani locality had a population of 44,472 people. As per the 2011 census the Bahjani locality has a population of 47,696 people.

Bahjani has a vast history related to education, social and agricultural, militancy, agitation, and political.

== History ==
During the British rule in India, Bahjani was a Tehsil. During the British Raj several people including Madan Barman and Rawta Koch (both killed in British police firing) from Bahjani area were involved in the Quit India Movement.

== Villages under Bahjani ==
The following is the list of villages under Bahjani mouza.

Village Name	Gaon Panchayat (GP) Name
Alengidal	7 No Pub Bahjani GP
Amayapur	7 No Pub Bahjani GP
Arara	7 No Pub Bahjani GP
Bhadra	7 No Pub Bahjani GP
Mugkuchi	7 No Pub Bahjani GP
Nanda Gaon	7 No Pub Bahjani GP
Tilana	7 No Pub Bahjani GP
Bar-Azara	8 No Uttar Bahjani GP
Chandra Kuchi	8 No Uttar Bahjani GP
Dakhin Bejera	8 No Uttar Bahjani GP
Dokuchi	8 No Uttar Bahjani GP
Janigog	8 No Uttar Bahjani GP
Madan-Mohan Sakhowa	8 No Uttar Bahjani GP
Budru Kuchi	9 No Madhya Bahjani GP
Khudra Sonkara	9 No Madhya Bahjani GP
Niz Bahjani	9 No Madhya Bahjani GP
Charia	10 No Dakhin Bahjani GP
Cherabari	10 No Dakhin Bahjani GP
Deharkalakuchi	10 No Dakhin Bahjani GP
Jaha	10 No Dakhin Bahjani GP
Kumarikata	10 No Dakhin Bahjani GP
Madhapur	10 No Dakhin Bahjani GP
Makal Daba	10 No Dakhin Bahjani GP
Pachimkhatar Kalakuchi	10 No Dakhin Bahjani GP
Pub Kalakuchi	10 No Dakhin Bahjani GP
