= Sonkuriha =

Sonkuriha Suvarnakundya
- village
- Location in Assam, India Sonkuriha (India)
- Coordinates: 26.39°N 91.45°E
- Country: India
- State: Assam
- Region: Western Assam
- District: Nalbari

Government
  - Body: Gram panchayat
- Elevation: 42 m (138 ft)

Languages
- Time zone: UTC+5:30 (IST)
- Telephone code: 03624
- Vehicle registration: AS-14-XXXX
- Website: nalbari.nic.in

Sonkuriha, 'Suvarnakundya' in ancient times, is a village in Nalbari district of Western Assam.

== Etymology ==
The modern name is derived from Sanskrit form 'Suvarnakundya', the ancient name of the area.

== History ==
The arthashastra of Kautilya mentioned flourishing trade with Kamrup. He mentioned finest sik of his times was produced in Sonkuriha (Suvarnakundya). It also produced a special perfume named 'Tailaparnika', which also produced in at least six other places within Kamrup region. The Kamrup also produced Chandana and Aguru products at that time.

Like rest of Kamrup region, language used in Sonkuriha is Assamese language.

== Festivals ==
Domahi, Amati, Durga Puja, Kali Puja (Shyama Puja, Diwali), Holi, Janmastami, Shivratri etc. are major festivals of the village. Vedic culture is widespread in day-to-day life.

== Transport ==
The village is well connected to

== See also ==
- Villages of Nalbari District

== Bibliography ==
- Ghoble, T. R. (2000). India, China, and South-East Asia: Dynamics of Development. Deep & Deep Publications. ISBN 978-81-7629-204-7.
