= Batsor =

Batsor Batshar
- Village
- Location in Assam, India Batsor (India)
- Coordinates: 26.379304°N 91.383793°E
- Country: India
- State: Assam
- Region: Western Assam
- District: Nalbari

Government
  - Body: Gram panchayat
- Elevation: 42 m (138 ft)

Population (2001)
  - Total: 1,148,824

Languages
  - Official: Assamese
- Time zone: UTC+5:30 (IST)
- Telephone code: 03624
- ISO 3166 code: IN-AS
- Vehicle registration: AS-14-XXXX
- Website: nalbari.nic.in

Batsor, also Batshar and Batchar is a village in Nalbari district of the Indian state of Western Assam. It is surrounded by Belsor, Churchuri and Goalpara.

== Culture ==
=== Language ===
The primary language is Kamrupi.

=== Festivals ===
Domahi, Amati, Durga Puja, Kali Puja (Shyama Puja, Diwali), Holi, Janmastami, Shivratri etc. are major festivals. Vedic culture is widespread in day-to-day life.

== Temples ==
Many old temples are present, including Kali Mandir, Ma Kamakhya Mandir (south Batsor) and Durga Mandir. Muslim citizens celebrate Eid, Maharam, Fateha etc. Villagers celebrate all religious occasions together.

== Transport ==
The village is connected to Nalbari and Gauhati by bus and other privately owned vehicles. National Highway 31 is to the north and is accessible through south by Hajo-Doulashal road.

== See also ==
- Villages of Nalbari District
