= Deharkuchi =

Deharkuchi Dehar Kuchi
- Village
- Location in Assam, India Deharkuchi (India)
- Coordinates: 26.372741°N 91.536051°E
- Country: India
- State: Assam
- Region: Western Assam
- District: Nalbari

Government
  - Type: Panchayati raj (India)
  - Body: Gram panchayat

Population (2011)
  - Total: 651

Languages
  - Official: Assamese
- Time zone: UTC+5:30 (IST)
- Website: nalbari.nic.in

Deharkuchi is a village of Nalbari district in Western Assam under 11 No. Deharkuchi Gram Panchayat of Borigog Banbhag Development Block. This village is located 14 km towards east from Nalbari district headquarters.

== Language ==
The primary language used in Deharkuchi is Kamrupi, as in Nalbari district and Kamrup region.

== Education ==
There is a lower primary school in Deharkuchi named Deharkuchi L.P. School

== See also ==
- Villages of Nalbari District
