= Marowa =

- Village
- Location in Assam, India Marowa (India)
- Coordinates: 26.3707379°N 91.4655473°E
- Country: India
- State: Assam
- Region: Western Assam
- District: Nalbari

Government
  - Type: Panchayati raj (India)
  - Body: Gram panchayat

Population (2011)
  - Total: 4,004

Languages
  - Official: Assamese
- Time zone: UTC+5:30 (IST)
- Website: nalbari.nic.in

Marowa is a village of Nalbari district in Western Assam under 51(5) No Upar Barbhag Gram Panchayat.

== Language ==
The primary language used in Marowa is Kamrupi, as in Nalbari district and Kamrup region.

== See also ==
- Villages of Nalbari District
