= Pajipar =

- Village
- Location in Assam, India Pajipar (India)
- Coordinates: 26.4101822°N 91.4970069°E
- Country: India
- State: Assam
- Region: Western Assam
- District: Nalbari

Government
  - Type: Panchayati raj (India)
  - Body: Gram panchayat

Population (2011)
  - Total: 77

Languages
  - Official: Assamese
- Time zone: UTC+5:30 (IST)
- Website: nalbari.nic.in

Pajipar is one of the least populated villages of Nalbari district in Western Assam under 2 No Khata Gram Panchayat of Pub Nalbari Development Block.

== Language ==
The primary language used in Pajipar is Kamrupi, as in Nalbari district and Kamrup region.

== See also ==
- Villages of Nalbari District
