= Haribhanga, Nalbari district =

Haribhanga
- Village
- Location in Assam, India Haribhanga (India)
- Coordinates: 26.441574°N 91.286516°E
- Country: India
- State: Assam
- Region: Western Assam
- District: Nalbari

Government
  - Type: Panchayati raj (India)
  - Body: Gram panchayat

Population (2011)
  - Total: 5,579

Languages
  - Official: Assamese
- Time zone: UTC+5:30 (IST)
- Website: nalbari.nic.in

Haribhanga is an agricultural village of Nalbari district in Western Assam under 45 No. Paschim Nambarbhag Gram Panchayat. Eighty percent of the population of this village depends on agriculture for their livelihood. For the development of economic, social, political, art and culture of the greater Haribhanga area, the Haribhanga Gaon Unnayan Sammittee was formed in. 1945. The most renowned, historical and religious holy place of Haribhanga is the Kaliya Gosai Mandir.

== Language ==
The primary language used in Haribhanga is Kamrupi dialect of Assamese language, as in Nalbari district and Kamrup region.

== Education ==
1. Haribhanga H.S. School
2. Haribhanga Girl High School.

== Places to Visit ==
- Kaliya Gosai Mandir

It is believed that the formation of Kaliya Gosai Mandir was at Hokakhowa jaan. Towards the east of the jaan, there lived an old lady who got a very unusual visitor one day. The dark-complexioned visitor told the lady to light an earthen lamp at the place where he stayed during the night and disappeared. The following morning, the lady did as she was told and astonishingly the earthen lamp she lit burnt continuously for seven days and nights. People heard about the tale and concluded that the visitor was none but Lord Krishna himself. The people decided that towards the west side of the house at a particular distance, they would construct a hut and a place for the idol of Lord Kaliya Gosai with the earthen lamp still burning. They also planted three bakul trees there. It was an auspicious day and people chanted hymns and prayers. Every year, prayers were organised along with the yearly festival and the place thereafter came to be known as Kaliya Gosai thaan and the hut came to known as Kaliya Gosai Ghar. Time passed by. During the reign of the Ahom king Shiva Singha, it was decided that a religious procession would be carried out with the Manikut which was constructed with sal wood. Thereafter, the decision was taken to construct the idol of Kaliya Gosai and Kaliya Gosai Ghar came to be known as Kaliya Gosai Mandir. The temple is considered to be very auspicious as people who come here with true beliefs got their wishes fulfilled.

Every year, a large amount of devotees from many places come and also offer puja the whole year, particularly on Magh 1 and the importance of this temple increases everyday due to the devotion, affection, trust and beliefs. The Kaliya Gosai (Lord Krishna) listens to their prayer and blesses them for their peace and happiness.

- Kamakhya Temple

According to the Kalika Purana, worship in Kamakhya fulfills all desires. Shiva's young wife and liberating power is known as Kamakhya. The Kamakhya temple in Haribhanga is one of the oldest temples across the country. It is believed that some parts of Sati’s body fell in the location of Kamakhya temple of Haribhanga.

== Transport ==
=== Road ===
Haribhanga is integrated into the National Highway system via Tihu Town connected to the East West Corridor (NH 31) of India providing easy access to important places in Assam.

=== Railway ===
Tihu Railway Station, which is just 5 km away from Haribhanga Village.

=== Airport ===
The nearest airport is airport is Lokpriya Gopinath Bordoloi International Airport in Guwahati.

== See also ==
- Villages of Nalbari District
