= Purna Kamdev =

- Village
- Location in Assam, India Purna Kamdev (India)
- Coordinates: 26.391587°N 91.541680°E
- Country: India
- State: Assam
- Region: Western Assam
- District: Nalbari

Government
  - Type: Panchayati raj (India)
  - Body: Gram panchayat

Population (2011)
  - Total: 289

Languages
  - Official: Assamese
- Time zone: UTC+5:30 (IST)
- Website: nalbari.nic.in

Purna Kamdev is a village of Nalbari district in Western Assam under 11 No. Deharkuchi Gram Panchayat of Borigog Banbhag Development Block. This village is situated on the bank of Baralia river.

== Language ==
The primary language used in Purna Kamdev is Kamrupi, as in Nalbari district and Kamrup region.

== Notable people ==
- Dilip Saikia

== See also ==
- Villages of Nalbari District
