= Bistupur (Nalbari) =

Village in Western Assam, India

- Village
- Location in Assam, India Bistupur (India)
- Coordinates: 26.4977547°N 91.4967302°E
- Country: India
- State: Assam
- Region: Western Assam
- District: Nalbari district

Government
  - Body: Gram panchayat
- Elevation: 42 m (138 ft)

Languages
  - Native: Kamrupi language
- Time zone: UTC+5:30 (IST)
- Postal code: 781369
- Website: nalbari.nic.in

Bistupur is a village in Nalbari district of Western Assam. It is located at north bank of river Brahmaputra.

== Culture ==
=== Language ===
The Nalbariya dialect of the Assamese language, is spoken in Bistupur.

=== Festivals ===
Domahi, Amati, Durga Puja, Kali Puja (Shyama Puja), Diwali, Holi, Janmastami, Shivratri etc. are major festivals of the village.

== Transport ==
The village is located north of Nalbari town, is well connected to Nalbari town and National Highway 27 by buses and other modes of transport. Railway station serving the village is Nalbari railway station and is connected by air through Gauhati International Airport.

== See also ==
- Barpipalia
- Nahira
