= Barpipalia =

- Village
- Location in Assam, India Barpipalia (India)
- Coordinates: 26.4926699°N 91.4976476°E
- Country: India
- State: Assam
- Region: Western Assam
- District: Nalbari district

Government
  - Body: Gram panchayat
- Elevation: 42 m (138 ft)

Languages
  - Native: Kamrupi language
- Time zone: UTC+5:30 (IST)
- Postal code: 781XXX
- Website: nalbari.nic.in

Barpipalia is a village in Nalbari district of Western Assam. It is located at north bank of river Brahmaputra.

== Culture ==
=== Language ===
The Nalbariya dialect of the Assamese language is spoken in Barpipalia.

=== Festivals ===
Domahi, Amati, Durga Puja, Kali Puja (Shyama Puja), Diwali, Holi, Janmastami, Shivratri etc. are major festivals of the village.

== Transport ==
The village is located north of Nalbari town, is well connected to Nalbari town and National Highway 27 by buses and other modes of transport. Railway station serving the village is Nalbari railway station and is connected by air through Gauhati International Airport.

== See also ==
- Bistupur
- Bihapara
