= Purna Daichapra =

Purna Daichapra Lahkar Para
- Village
- Location in Assam, India Purna Daichapra (India)
- Coordinates: 26.42°N 91.43°E
- Country: India
- State: Assam
- Region: Western Assam
- District: Nalbari

Government
  - Type: Panchayati raj (India)
  - Body: Gram panchayat

Population (2001)
  - Total: 400

Languages
  - Official: Assamese
- Time zone: UTC+5:30 (IST)
- Postal Index Number: 781350
- Telephone code: 03624
- Vehicle registration: AS-14-XXXX
- Website: nalbari.nic.in

Purna Daichapra (also known as Lahkar Para) is a village of Nalbari district in Western Assam. This village is situated in the border of Nalbari and Kamrup District.

== Culture ==
=== Language ===
The primary language used in Purna Daichapra is Kamrupi, as in Nalbari district and Kamrup region.

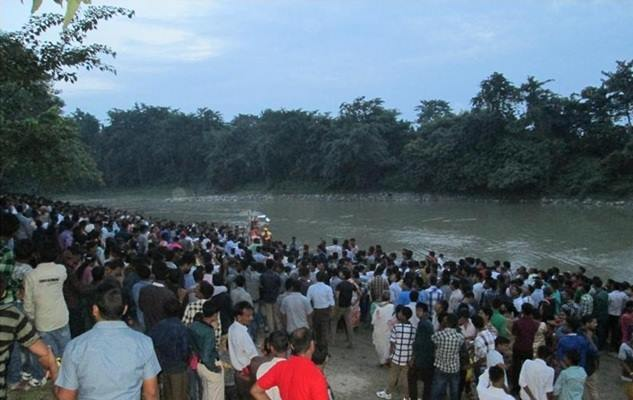
Maa Durga for immersion in the Baralia River, near Baharghat of Purna Daichapra

=== Festivals ===
Holi, Janmastami, Shivratri, etc. are celebrated with much fanfare. Vedic culture is widespread in day-to-day life. Many old temples, such as Daul Mandir and Hanuman Mandir, can be found in this area.

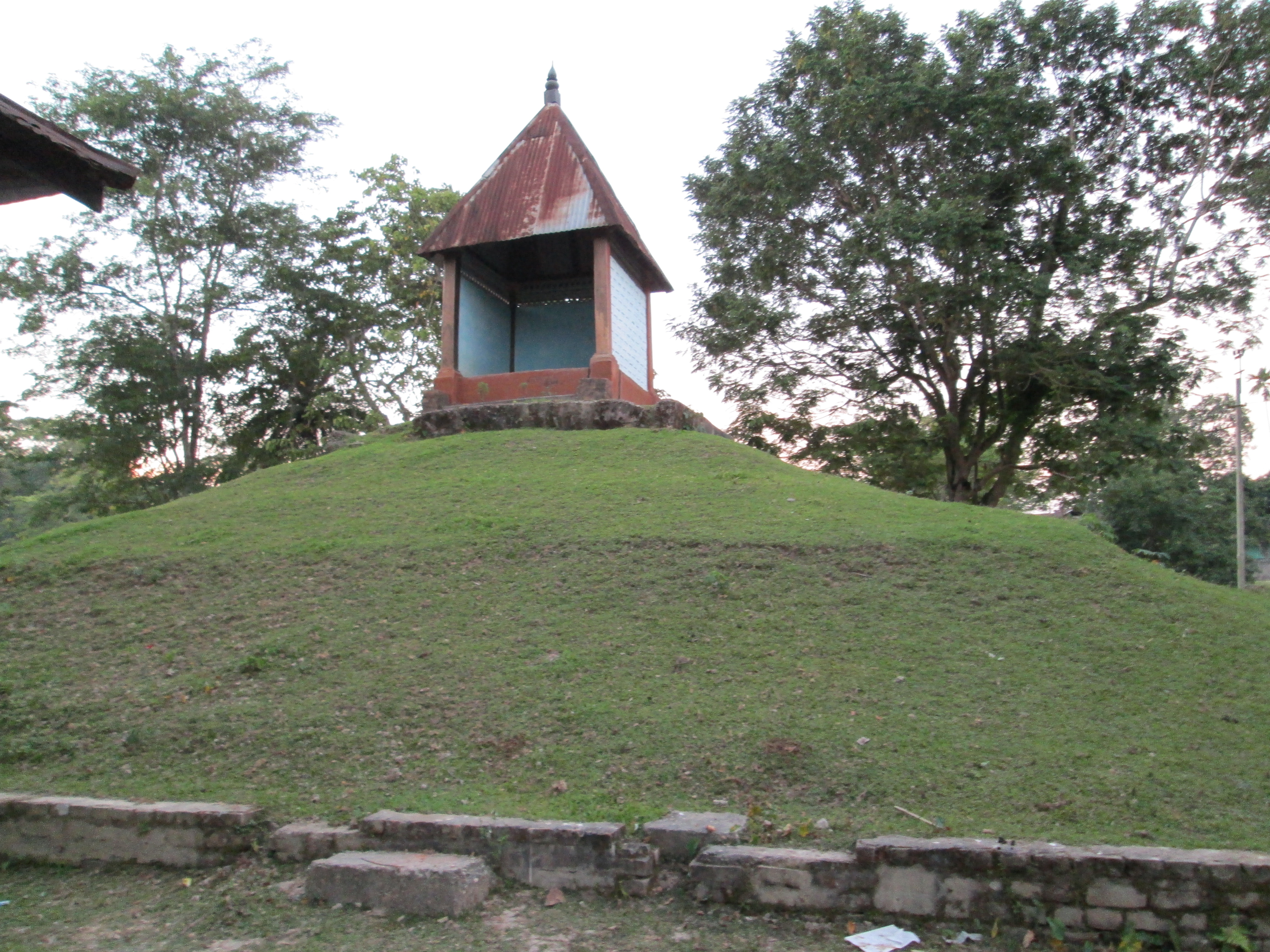
Daul Mandir of Purna Daichapra Village in Nalbari of Western Assam

== Education ==
There is a high school in Purna Daichapra named P B Lahkar Para High School and a lower primary School named Lahkar Para Pateswari LPS.

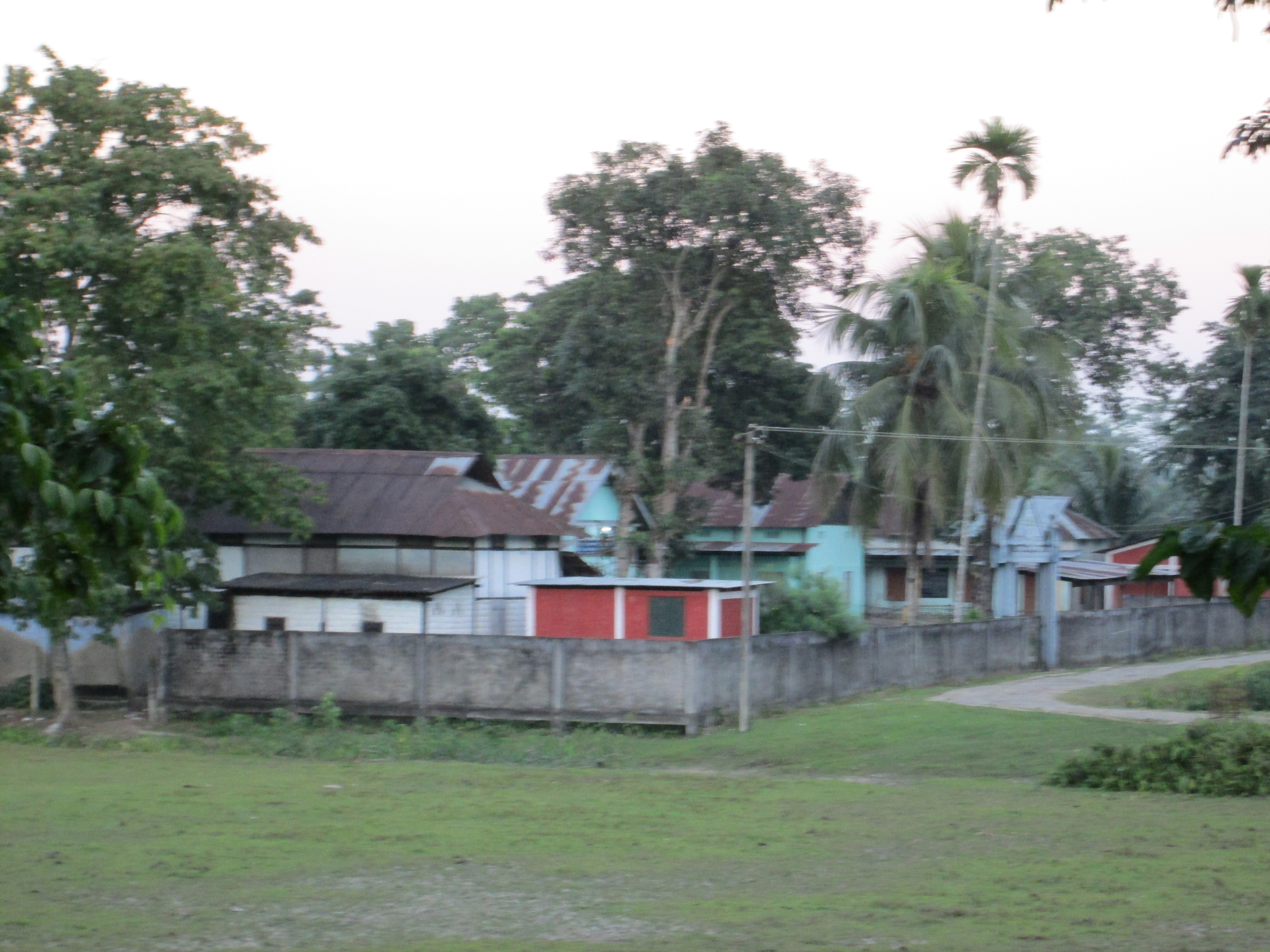
পূৰ্ণ দৈচপৰা (লহকৰ পাৰা) -অৰ প: ব: লহকৰ পাৰা হাইস্কুল

== Transport ==
The village is well connected to Nalbari and Gauhati by regular buses, trekkers and other privately owned vehicles in north and accessible through Dimu-Baharghat road.

== Notable people ==
- Engineer & Social Media Activist Biraj Lahkar

== See also ==
- Villages of Nalbari District
