= Akana (village) =

Akana Akna
- Village
- Location in Assam, India Akana (India)
- Coordinates: 26.4895119°N 91.5607412°E
- Country: India
- State: Assam
- Region: Western Assam
- District: Nalbari

Government
  - Type: Panchayati raj (India)
  - Body: Gram panchayat

Population (2011)
  - Total: 1,459

Languages
  - Official: Assamese
- Time zone: UTC+5:30 (IST)
- Website: nalbari.nic.in

Akana (also known as Akna) is a village of Nalbari district in Western Assam under 14 No Pub Banbhag Gram Panchayat.

== See also ==
- Villages of Nalbari District
