= Kamrup College =

College in Assam

- Type: Higher secondary, Undergraduate college
- Established: 1966
- Affiliations: Gauhati University
- Principal: Dr. Debendra Kumar Bezbaruah
- Location: Chamata, Assam, India
- Website: kamrupcollege.org.in

Kamrup College is an undergraduate college established in the year 1966 at Chamata of Nalbari district in Assam. The college is affiliated to Gauhati University.

== Departments ==
- Assamese
- Arabic
- English
- Economics
- Education
- Mathematics
- Philosophy
- Political Science
- Sanskrit

== Accreditation ==
In 2016 the college has been awarded "A" grade with CGPA 3.04 by National Assessment and Accreditation Council. The college is also recognised by University Grants Commission (India).
