= Patkata =

Patkata may refer to:

- Patkata, Assam, village in Nalbari district, Assam, India
- Patkata, West Bengal, village in Jalpaiguri district, West Bengal, India
