= Arikuchi =

Villages in Nalbari district

- Village
- Map of Assam Arikuchi (India)
- Coordinates: 26.3501°N 91.46466°E
- Country: India
- State: Assam
- District: Nalbari
- Region: Nalbari

Area
  - Total: 153.32 ha (378.9 acres)
- Elevation: 56 m (184 ft)

Population (2011)
  - Total: 1,997
  - Density: 1,303/km^{2} (3,373/sq mi)

Languages
  - Official: Assamese
- Time zone: UTC+5:30 (IST)
- Postal code: 781339
- STD Code: 03624
- Vehicle registration: AS-14
- Census code: 303867

Arikuchi is a census village in Barbhag revenue circle of Nalbari district, Assam, India. The village has population of 1,997, where 1,003 are males and 994 are females as per 2011 Census of India.
