= Paikan Bonmaza =

Paikan Bonmaza is a village situated in Nalbari district in Assam, India. It comes under Mukalmua Police station and Barkhetri constituency. It is basically occupied by the Hindu and Muslim community. The total population is about 1900.
