= Balikaria =

Village in Assam

Balikaria Bali Karia
- Village
- Map of Assam Balikaria (India)
- Coordinates: 26.4331°N 91.4169°E
- Country: India
- State: Assam
- District: Nalbari
- Subdivision: Nalbari
- Elevation: 54 m (177 ft)

Population (2011)
  - Total: 6,359

Languages
  - Official: Assamese
- Time zone: UTC+5:30 (IST)
- Postal code: 781341
- STD Code: 03624
- Vehicle registration: AS-14

Balikaria, also spelled as Bali Karia, is a village in Nalbari district, Assam, India. According to the 2011 Census of India, Balikaria has a population of 6,359 people including 3,305 males and 3,054 females with literacy rate of 86.54%. The 500 years old Kharzara Ashram is located on Balikaria. It's the oldest Ashram of Assam.
