= Ulabari =

Villages

- Village
- Interactive map of Ulabari
- Coordinates: 26.33371°N 91.47351°E
- Country: India
- State: Assam
- District: Nalbari
- Region: Nalbari

Population (2011)
  - Total: 1,744

Languages
  - Official: Assamese
- Time zone: UTC+5:30 (IST)
- Postal code: 781339

Ulabari is a village located in Barbhag Circle of Nalbari district in Assam. The village has population of a total 1,744 of which 903 are males and. 841 are females as per Census 2011 of India.
