= Khatikuchi =

- Village
- Map of Assam Khatikuchi (India)
- Coordinates: 26.5440°N 91.53901°E
- Country: India
- State: Assam
- District: Nalbari
- Region: Ghograpar

Area
  - Total: 222.92 ha (550.8 acres)
- Elevation: 56 m (184 ft)

Population (2011)
  - Total: 2,049
  - Density: 919.2/km^{2} (2,381/sq mi)

Languages
  - Official: Assamese
- Time zone: UTC+5:30 (IST)
- Postal code: 781369
- STD Code: 03624
- Vehicle registration: AS-14
- Census code: 304037

Khatikuchi is a census village in Nalbari district, Assam, India. As per 2011 Census of India, Khatikuchi village has population of total 2,049 people, out of them 1,042 were males and 1,007 were females.
