= Burinagar =

Villages in Assam, India

Buri Nagar Burinagar
- Village
- Map of Assam Buri Nagar (India)
- Coordinates: 26.49214°N 91.41914°E
- Country: India
- State: Assam
- District: Nalbari
- Subdivision: Banekuchi

Area
  - Total: 408.4 ha (1,009 acres)

Population (2011)
  - Total: 2,555
  - Density: 625.6/km^{2} (1,620/sq mi)

Languages
  - Official: Assamese
- Time zone: UTC+5:30 (IST)
- Postal code: 781341
- STD Code: 03624
- Census code: 303998

Buri Nagar, commonly known as Burinagar, is a census village under Natun Dehar Gram Panchayat in Nalbari district, Assam, India. As per 2011 Census of India, the village has a total population of 2,555 people, including 1,344 males and 1,211 females, and has a literacy rate of 75.34%.

Burinagar has a history of being militancy affected area. At Burinagar, on 17 March 1999, the ULFA militants killed 3 youths in suspicion of being informers of police. On 5 January 2006, the ex-president of Nalbari block Congress, Chand Muhammad Ali, was killed by the NDFB militants at Burinagar.
