= Barkura =

Village in Assam, India

Barkura Borkura
- Village
- Map of Assam Barkura (India)
- Coordinates: 26.4507°N 91.4266°E
- Country: India
- State: Assam
- District: Nalbari
- Subdivision: Nalbari
- Gram Panchayat: Paschim Batahgila

Area
  - Total: 470.27 ha (1,162.1 acres)

Population (2011)
  - Total: 3,516
  - Density: 747.7/km^{2} (1,936/sq mi)

Languages
  - Official: Assamese
- Time zone: UTC+5:30 (IST)
- Postal code: 781335
- STD Code: 03624
- Census code: 303897

Barkura, also spelled as Borkura, is a census village in Nalbari district, Assam, India. As per the 2011 Census of India, Barkura has a total population of 3,516 including 1,827 males and 1,689 females with a literacy rate of 79.41%.

Barkura village has a markable history in the Assam Movement, where the movement participants tried to stop Abida Ahmed from filing her nomination for the Barpeta constituency.
