= Barsarkuchi =

Village in India

- Village
- Map of Assam Barsarkuchi (India)
- Coordinates: 26.474230°N 91.442107°E
- Country: India
- State: Assam
- District: Nalbari
- Subdivision: Nalbari

Area
  - Total: 147.32 ha (364.0 acres)

Population (2011)
  - Total: 2,330
  - Density: 1,580/km^{2} (4,100/sq mi)

Languages
  - Official: Assamese
- Time zone: UTC+5:30 (IST)
- STD Code: 03624
- Vehicle registration: AS-14
- Census code: 303901

Barsarkuchi is a census village in Nalbari district, Assam, India. According to the 2011 Census of India, Barsarkuchi has a total population of 2,330 people including 1,201 males and 1,129 females with a literacy rate of 78.41%.
