= Namati =

Village in Assam, India

- Village
- Map of Assam Namati (India)
- Coordinates: 26.5210°N 91.4701°E
- Country: India
- State: Assam
- District: Nalbari
- Subdivision: Ghograpar

Area
  - Total: 564.16 ha (1,394.1 acres)

Population (2011)
  - Total: 3,807
  - Density: 674.8/km^{2} (1,748/sq mi)

Languages
  - Official: Assamese
- Time zone: UTC+5:30 (IST)
- Postal code: 781349
- STD Code: 03624
- Vehicle registration: AS-14
- Census code: 303914

Namati is a village in Nalbari district, Assam, India. As per the 2011 Census of India, Namati village has a total population of 3,807 people including 1,943 males and 1,864 females.
