= Kendukuchi =

Village in Assam, India

- Village
- Map of Assam Kendukuchi (India)
- Coordinates: 26.53344°N 91.42092°E
- Country: India
- State: Assam
- District: Nalbari
- Subdivision: Nalbari

Area
  - Total: 286.51 ha (708.0 acres)
- Elevation: 56 m (184 ft)

Population (2011)
  - Total: 2,390
  - Density: 834/km^{2} (2,160/sq mi)

Languages
  - Official: Assamese
- Time zone: UTC+5:30 (IST)
- Postal code: 781341
- STD Code: 03624
- Vehicle registration: AS-14
- Census code: 303993

Kendukuchi is a census village in Nalbari district, Assam, India. As per the 2011 Census of India, Kendukuchi village has a total population of 2,390 people including 1,237 males and 1,153 females.

Kendukuchi carries a history of being militancy affected area.
