= Kamarkuchi =

Villages in Nalbari district

- Village
- Map of Assam Kamarkuchi (India)
- Coordinates: 26.3661°N 91.49700°E
- Country: India
- State: Assam
- District: Nalbari
- Region: Nalbari

Area
  - Total: 195.62 ha (483.4 acres)
- Elevation: 56 m (184 ft)

Population (2011)
  - Total: 2,231
  - Density: 1,140/km^{2} (2,954/sq mi)

Languages
  - Official: Assamese
- Time zone: UTC+5:30 (IST)
- Postal code: 781347
- STD Code: 03624
- Vehicle registration: AS-14

Kamarkuchi is a census village in Barbhag revenue circle of Nalbari district, Assam, India. The village has population of 2,231, where 1,143 are males and 1,088 are females as per 2011 census of India.
