= Chandkuchi =

Chandkuchi Chandra Kuchi
- Village
- Map of Assam Chandkuchi (India)
- Coordinates: 26.4102°N 91.43126°E
- Country: India
- State: Assam
- District: Nalbari
- Gram Panchayat: Uttar Bahjani

Area
  - Total: 371.56 ha (918.1 acres)
- Elevation: 56 m (184 ft)

Population (2011)
  - Total: 3,400
  - Density: 920/km^{2} (2,400/sq mi)

Languages
  - Official: Assamese
- Time zone: UTC+5:30 (IST)
- Postal code: 781334
- STD Code: 03624
- Vehicle registration: AS-14
- Census code: 303962

Chandkuchi also named as Chandra Kuchi is a census village in Nalbari district, Assam, India. As per 2011 Census of India, the village has a total population of 3,400 people of which 1,767 are males and 1,633 are females.
