= Arara, India =

Village in Assam, India

Arara
- Village
- Map of Assam Arara (India)
- Coordinates: 26.4089°N 91.4749°E
- Country: India
- State: Assam
- District: Nalbari
- Subdivision: Nalbari

Area
  - Total: 359.32 ha (887.9 acres)

Population (2011)
  - Total: 2,823
  - Density: 785.7/km^{2} (2,035/sq mi)

Languages
  - Official: Assamese
- Time zone: UTC+5:30 (IST)
- Postal code: 781334
- STD Code: 03624
- Vehicle registration: AS-14
- Census code: 303954

Arara is a census village in Nalbari district, Assam, India. According to the 2011 Census of India, Arara village has a total population of 2,823 people including 1,444 males and 1,379 females.

The village has a history of being a militancy affected area. In 2006, the security forces killed 2 ULFA militants, Bhupen Lahkar and Hemanta Deka, in Arara.
