= Niz Bahjani =

Village in India

Niz Bahjani Nij Bahjani
- Village
- Map of Assam Niz Bahjani (India)
- Coordinates: 26.3857°N 91.4314°E
- Country: India
- State: Assam
- District: Nalbari
- Subdivision: Nalbari
- Gram Panchayat: Madhya Bahjani

Area
  - Total: 769.12 ha (1,900.5 acres)

Population (2011)
  - Total: 5,183
  - Density: 673.9/km^{2} (1,745/sq mi)

Languages
  - Official: Assamese
- Time zone: UTC+5:30 (IST)
- Postal code: 781334
- STD Code: 03624
- Vehicle registration: AS-14
- Census code: 303980

Niz Bahjani, also spelled as Nij Bahjani, is a census village in Nalbari district, Assam, India. According to the 2011 Census of India, the village Niz Bahjani village has a total population of 5,183 people including 2,714 males and 2,469 females with a literacy rate of 78.41%.
