= Basudev Devalaya =

- বসুদেৱ দেৱালয়
- Location in Nalbari

Religion
- Affiliation: Hinduism
- District: Nalbari district
- Deity: Basudev
- Festivals: Dol Purnima; Krishna Janmashtami; Maha Shivratri

Location
- Location: Balikaria, Nalbari district, Assam
- State: Assam
- Country: India
- Interactive map of Basudev Devalaya
- Coordinates: 26°26′02.7″N 91°24′29.9″E

Architecture
- Type: Hindu temple architecture
- Creator: Sutanphaa

Basudev Devalaya (Assamese:বসুদেৱ দেৱালয়) in Balikaria, Nalbari district, Assam is an ancient Hindu temple and is dedicated to Basudev. This temple was built by Ahom King Sutanphaa (1714-1744).

== History ==
Basudev Devalaya has a very fascinating story attached to it. As per the local folklore, once fishing net of a fisherman got stuck in a pond known as Jaymangal Beel for seven days. On the seventh day, a local named Gada Kahar had a dream of Lord Basudev wishing to be relieved from the fishing net. When the news of dream reached Ahom King Sutanphaa, he immediately tried to remove the two stones on the spot. However, because of the failing attempt, he built the temple there.
