= Thetha Gohain Than =

- থেঠা গোসাঁইৰ থান
- Location in Nalbari

Religion
- Affiliation: Hinduism
- District: Nalbari district
- Deity: Krishna

Location
- Location: Dokoha, Nalbari district, Assam
- State: Assam
- Country: India
- Interactive map of Thetha Gohain Than
- Coordinates: 26°19′56.7″N 91°29′24.8″E

Architecture
- Type: Hindu temple architecture

Thetha Gohain Than (Assamese: থেঠা গোসাঁইৰ থান) in Dokoha, Nalbari district, Assam is a 19th-century Hindu temple and is dedicated to Krishna. The temple was established at the end of the 19th century, on a piece of land donated by the late Janmi Majumdar who was an inhabitant of Kamarkuchi of Nalbari district. Thetha Gohain (Assamese: থেঠা গোসাঁই) means child Krishna. Land development and plantation plan have been registered under NREGA for further development of this temple.
