= Janigog =

Village in Assam, India

- Village
- Map of Assam Janigog (India)
- Coordinates: 26.4091°N 91.4507°E
- Country: India
- State: Assam
- District: Nalbari
- Subdivision: Nalbari

Area
  - Total: 232.12 ha (573.6 acres)

Population (2011)
  - Total: 3,795
  - Density: 1,635/km^{2} (4,234/sq mi)

Languages
  - Official: Assamese
- Time zone: UTC+5:30 (IST)
- Postal code: 781334
- STD Code: 03624
- Vehicle registration: AS-14
- Census code: 303965

Janigog is a census village in Nalbari district, Assam, India. As per the 2011 Census of India, Janigog has a total population of 3,795 people including 1,991 males and 1,804 females.

Janigog has a history of being militancy affected area.
