= Paila (village) =

Village in Nalbari district

- Village
- Map of Assam Paila (India)
- Coordinates: 26.4467°N 91.4573°E
- Country: India
- State: Assam
- District: Nalbari

Area
  - Total: 103.63 ha (256.1 acres)
- Elevation: 55 m (180 ft)

Population (2011)
  - Total: 2,104
  - Density: 2,030/km^{2} (5,258/sq mi)

Languages
  - Official: Assamese
- Time zone: UTC+5:30 (IST)
- STD Code: 03624
- Vehicle registration: AS-14
- Census code: 303933

Paila is a census village in Nalbari district, Assam, India. The village has population of 2,104, including 1,079 males and 1,025 females as per 2011 Census of India.
