= Amayapur =

Village in India

- Village
- Map of Assam Amayapur (India)
- Coordinates: 26.4031°N 91.4604°E
- Country: India
- State: Assam
- District: Nalbari
- Subdivision: Nalbari
- Gram Panchayat: Pub Bahjani

Area
  - Total: 149.54 ha (369.5 acres)

Population (2011)
  - Total: 1,463
  - Density: 978.3/km^{2} (2,534/sq mi)

Languages
  - Official: Assamese
- Time zone: UTC+5:30 (IST)
- Postal code: 781367
- STD Code: 03624
- Vehicle registration: AS-14
- Census code: 303966

Amayapur is a census village in the Nalbari district, Assam, India. According to the 2011 Census of India, Amayapur has a total population of 1,463, with 751 males and 712 females, and a literacy rate of 84.76%.
