= Sariahtali =

Village in Assam, India

- Village
- Map of Assam Sariahtali (India)
- Coordinates: 26.4801°N 91.4362°E
- Country: India
- State: Assam
- District: Nalbari
- Tehsil: Nalbari

Area
  - Total: 529.71 ha (1,308.9 acres)

Population (2011)
  - Total: 3,830
  - Density: 723/km^{2} (1,870/sq mi)

Languages
  - Official: Assamese
- Time zone: UTC+5:30 (IST)
- Postal code: 781337
- STD Code: 03624
- Census code: 303899

Sariahtali is a village in Nalbari district, Assam, India. As per 2011 Census of India, Sariahtali has a population of 3,830 people with a literacy rate of 67.23%. The Government Industrial Training Institute (ITI), Nalbari is located in Sariahtali.
