= Domahi =

Festival celebrated in Western Assam

Domahi, or Domasi and Damhi, is a popular harvesting festival, celebrated in the Kamrup and eastern Goalpara regions of Western Assam. It marks the commencement and end of the harvesting season, and start and end of the Kamrupi and Goalpariya new years.

== Etymology ==
The term consists of two words "Do" which means two and "mah" or "mas" meaning month. The word 'Domahi' means the junction of two months.

== Types ==
The festival is subdivided into "Maghar Domahi" (mid January), "Baihagar or Baishakh Domahi" (mid April) and "Katir or Kartika Domahi" (mid October). Astronomically Baihagar Domahi is associated with Vernal equinox, Kati Domahi is with Autumnal equinox and Maghar Domahi with Winter solstice. Greater importance is attached to the winter festival than to the spring festival. But the third festival, held in autumn, is not always considered as another Domahi.

=== Maghar Domahi ===
Maghar Domahi or Domasi is a festival of feasting after the end of harvesting season and year. Its celebrated around mid of January. A mass feast is organised on the eve of this festival which is called as "log bhaat" or "bhoj bhat". the Maghar Domahi starts from the last day of "puh maah" according to the Assamese calendar. The first day of Maghar Domahi is called "uruka". On this day, women prepare pithas, larus, and maah korai.

=== Baihagar Domahi ===
Baihagar or Baishakh Domahi is special spring time festival. A fair usually held in the first week of Baihag or third week of April. It is known as "Bhatheli" in northern Kamrup, "Sori" or "Suanri" in southern Kamrup. In the southern part of Kamrup, where the festival is known as Sori, planting of tall bamboos is not seen, but bamboo posts, with a tuft at the top. People bow before the bamboos and also touch them with reverence in northern Kamrup.

==== Bhatheli ====
Bhatheli, as called in North Kamrup ( Nalbari, Rangiya, etc.), is held in the month of Vaisakha. Each area is decorated with a long bamboo with flag and streamers. The one who adjusts best is called the bridegroom. The others, who are termed brides, then surround the bamboo in a circle, and a mock marriage ceremony is performed. One of the main features of the festival is the planting of two green bamboos. On the fixed date in the morning young men take purifying baths. They cut two bamboos and decorated it with coloured cloth and cowries, followed by celebrations with music and instruments. A large scale fair accompanied with trading of different commodities.

In the south Kamrup where it is known as "Sori" or "Suanri" follows the same pattern with a few variations. In the Bajali area of north Kamrup a bamboo is kept against a Banyan tree called "Madan Mohan Gosain", a name of Krishna.

Banikanta Kakati draws attention towards similarity between Bhatheli and ancient Indradhwaja festival. The Indradhwaja festival is described as "Sakrotthana" in the Kalika Purana, and it took place around a pole with flags. The procedures for the festival as described in the Kalika Purana approximate the preparations to be made for the celebrations of Bhatheli of the present days. The two festivals appear to be one except on certain minor details.

== See also ==
- Amati
