= Japarkuchi =

Village in Nalbari district, Assam, India

- Village
- Map of Assam Japarkuchi (India)
- Coordinates: 26.4460°N 91.4519°E
- Country: India
- State: Assam
- District: Nalbari
- Region: Nalbari

Population (2011)
  - Total: 4,626

Languages
  - Official: Assamese
- Time zone: UTC+5:30 (IST)
- Postal code: 781334

Japarkuchi is an urban locality in Nalbari district, Assam, India. As per the 2011 Census of India, Japarkuchi has a population of 4,626 people including 2331 males and 2295 females, with a literacy rate of 87.44%.
