= Digheli =

Village in Assam, India

- Village
- Map of Assam Digheli (India)
- Coordinates: 26.4422°N 91.4598°E
- Country: India
- State: Assam
- District: Nalbari
- Tehsil: Digheli
- Elevation: 55 m (180 ft)

Population (2011)
  - Total: 5,285

Languages
  - Official: Assamese
- Time zone: UTC+5:30 (IST)
- Postal code: 781371
- STD Code: 03624
- Vehicle registration: AS-14
- Census code: 303979

Digheli is a census village in Nalbari district, Assam, India. As per the 2011 Census of India, Digheli has a total population of 5,285 people including 2,696 males and 2,589 females, and with a literacy rate of 91.17%.

Digheli has a history of militancy affected and flood affected area.
