= Billeswar =

Village in Assam, India

- Village
- Map of Assam Billeswar (India)
- Coordinates: 26.39376°N 91.38133°E
- Country: India
- State: Assam
- District: Nalbari
- Gram Panchayat: Dakhin Pakowa

Area
  - Total: 237.53 ha (586.9 acres)

Population (2011)
  - Total: 2,699
  - Density: 1,136/km^{2} (2,943/sq mi)

Languages
  - Official: Assamese
- Time zone: UTC+5:30 (IST)
- Postal code: 781304
- STD Code: 03624
- Census code: 303683

Billeswar is a census village in the Pachim Nalbari subdivision, Nalbari district, Assam, India. As per 2011 census of India, Billeswar village has a population of 2,699 people, including 1,408 males and 1,291 females, and a literacy rate of 76.84%.

The Billeswar temple, built by king Nagaksha, is a major attraction of visits to the village.
