= Sondha =

Village in Assam, India

Sondha Sandha
- Village
- Map of Assam Sondha (India)
- Coordinates: 26.4487°N 91.47454°E
- Country: India
- State: Assam
- District: Nalbari
- Region: Nalbari

Area
  - Total: 441.35 ha (1,090.6 acres)
- Elevation: 56 m (184 ft)

Population (2011)
  - Total: 3,428
  - Density: 776.7/km^{2} (2,012/sq mi)

Languages
  - Official: Assamese
- Time zone: UTC+5:30 (IST)
- Postal code: 781337
- STD Code: 03624
- Vehicle registration: AS-14

Sondha, also spelled as Sandha, is a village in Nalbari district, Assam, India. As per the 2011 Census of India, Sondha has a population of 3,428 people with literacy rate of 76.95%.

Sondha is also known for fish farming.

== History ==
In 1894, people gathered and held a Raijmel (public convention) at Sondha to protest against the British. During the Assam Movement, the Sondha unit of AASU was formed.

== Schools in Sondha ==
There are total 6 government high schools in Sondha. Those are:

- Kharbandha Vidyapith High School
- Rajkadamtal Sondha High School
- Rajkadamtal Balika Vidyalaya
- Sondha Moheswari Sanskrit Tol

Other government schools in Sondha as per Sarva Shiksha Abhiyan of Government of India are:

- 165/1 No Sondha LPS
- 165/2 No Sondha A.R. Pathsala
- Dakhin Sondha Milan LPS
- Kharbandha Vidyapith (ME)s
- Subha Priya LPS
- Sondha Maheswar Chatuspathi
- Manav Shakti Jatiya Vidyalaya
