= Deharkalakuchi =

Village in Assam, India

- Village
- Map of Assam Deharkalakuchi (India)
- Coordinates: 26.3564°N 91.4072°E
- Country: India
- State: Assam
- District: Nalbari
- Gram Panchayat: Bahjani

Area
  - Total: 279.49 ha (690.6 acres)

Population (2011)
  - Total: 2,802
  - Density: 1,003/km^{2} (2,597/sq mi)

Languages
  - Official: Assamese
- Time zone: UTC+5:30 (IST)
- Postal code: 781310
- STD Code: 03624
- Vehicle registration: AS-14
- Census code: 303976

Deharkalakuchi is a census village in Nalbari district, Assam, India. As per the 2011 Census of India, Deharkalakuchi has a total population of 2,802 people including 1,435 males and 1,367 females with a literacy rate of 64.85%.
