= Madhapur, Assam =

Village in India

Madhapur
- Village
- Map of Assam Madhapur (India)
- Coordinates: 26.4031°N 91.4604°E
- Country: India
- State: Assam
- District: Nalbari
- Subdivision: Nalbari
- Gram Panchayat: Dakhin Bahjani

Area
  - Total: 250.565 ha (619.16 acres)

Population (2011)
  - Total: 3,100
  - Density: 1,200/km^{2} (3,200/sq mi)

Languages
  - Official: Assamese
- Time zone: UTC+5:30 (IST)
- Postal code: 781346
- STD Code: 03624
- Vehicle registration: AS-14
- Census code: 303973

Madhapur is a census village in Nalbari district, Assam, India. As per the 2011 Census of India, Madhapur village has a total population of 3,100 people including 1,586 males and 1,514 females with a literacy rate of 69.19%.
