= Chamata =

Village in Assam, India

- Village
- Map of Assam Chamata (India)
- Coordinates: 26.4058°N 91.3337°E
- Country: India
- State: Assam
- District: Nalbari
- Region: Nalbari

Area
  - Total: 330.33 ha (816.3 acres)

Population (2011)
  - Total: 6,114
  - Density: 1,851/km^{2} (4,794/sq mi)

Languages
  - Official: Assamese
- Time zone: UTC+5:30 (IST)
- Postal code: 781306

Chamata is a village in Nalbari district, in Assam, India. As per 2011 Census of India, Chamata has a population of 6,114 people including 3,102 males and 3,012 females, and with a literacy rate of 81.04%.

One of the notable colleges in Chamata is Kamrup College, established in 1966.
