= Pub Kalakuchi =

Village in India

Pub Kalakuchi Pub-Kalakuchi
- Village
- Map of Assam Pub Kalakuchi (India)
- Coordinates: 26.3562°N 91.4362°E
- Country: India
- State: Assam
- District: Nalbari
- Subdivision: Nalbari
- Gram Panchayat: Dakhin Bahjani

Area
  - Total: 235.26 ha (581.3 acres)

Population (2011)
  - Total: 2,567
  - Density: 1,091/km^{2} (2,826/sq mi)

Languages
  - Official: Assamese
- Time zone: UTC+5:30 (IST)
- Postal code: 781348
- STD Code: 03624
- Vehicle registration: AS-14
- Census code: 303974

Pub-Kalakuchi, also spelled as Pub Kalakuchi, is a census village in Nalbari district, Assam, India. According to the 2011 Census of India, Pub-Kalakuchi village has a total population of 2,567 people including 1,323 males and 1,244 females with a literacy rate of 66.61%.
