= Charia, Nalbari district =

Village in Nalbari district, Assam, India

Charia Saria
- Village
- Map of Assam Charia (India)
- Coordinates: 26.37428°N 91.44118°E
- Country: India
- State: Assam
- District: Nalbari
- Gram Panchayat: Dakhin Bahjani

Area
  - Total: 188.87 ha (466.7 acres)
- Elevation: 56 m (184 ft)

Population (2011)
  - Total: 2,477
  - Density: 1,311/km^{2} (3,397/sq mi)

Languages
  - Official: Assamese
- Time zone: UTC+5:30 (IST)
- Postal code: 781348
- STD Code: 03624
- Vehicle registration: AS-14
- Census code: 303972

Charia is a census village in Nalbari district, Assam, India. As per the 2011 Census of India, Charia has a total population of 2,477 people including 1,289 males and 1,188 females with a literacy rate of 64.19%.
