= Patkata, Assam =

Village in Assam, India

Patkata
- Village
- Location within Assam Location within India
- Coordinates: 26°27′05″N 91°30′59″E
- Country: India
- State: Assam
- District: Nalbari
- Subdivision: Ghograpar

Government
  - Type: Sarpanch

Area
  - Total: 0.19 km^{2} (0.073 sq mi)
- Elevation: 53 m (174 ft)

Population (2011)
  - Total: 203
  - Density: 1,100/km^{2} (2,800/sq mi)

Languages
  - Official: Assamese
- Time zone: UTC+5:30 (IST)
- PIN: 781369
- STD code: 03624
- Vehicle registration: AS-14

Patkata is a village in Ghograpar Subdivision, Nalbari District, Assam, India. It is located near the district boundary with Kamrup District, about 8 kilometres east of the district seat Nalbari, and 1 kilometres west of the subdivision seat Ghograpar. In 2011, the village has a population of 203.

== Geography ==
Paktaka is located on the south of the National Highway 27. It occupies an area of 18.65 hectares.

== Demographics ==
According to the 2011 India Census, Patkata had a total of 42 householeds. Among the local population, 108 were male and 95 were female. The average literacy rate was 73.89%, with 88 of the male residents and 62 of the female residents being literate.
