= Budrukuchi =

Village in India

BudruKuchi Budru Kuchi
- Village
- Map of Assam BudruKuchi (India)
- Coordinates: 26.3914°N 91.4507°E
- Country: India
- State: Assam
- District: Nalbari
- Gram Panchayat: Madhya Bahjani

Area
  - Total: 193.28 ha (477.6 acres)

Population (2011)
  - Total: 2,565
  - Density: 1,327/km^{2} (3,437/sq mi)

Languages
  - Official: Assamese
- Time zone: UTC+5:30 (IST)
- Postal code: 781334
- STD Code: 03624
- Vehicle registration: AS-14
- Census code: 303967

Budrukuchi, also spelled as Budru Kuchi, is a census village in Nalbari district, Assam, India. As per the 2011 Census of India, Budrukuchi village has a total population of 2,565 people, including 1,317 males and 1,248 females with a literacy rate of 81.91%.
