= Barkuriha =

Village in Nalbari district, Assam, India

- Village
- Map of Assam Barkuriha (India)
- Coordinates: 26.3854°N 91.4652°E
- Country: India
- State: Assam
- District: Nalbari
- Gram panchayat: Marowa

Area
  - Total: 179.5 ha (444 acres)

Population (2011)
  - Total: 2,915
  - Density: 1,624/km^{2} (4,206/sq mi)

Languages
  - Official: Assamese
- Time zone: UTC+5:30 (IST)
- Postal code: 781348
- STD Code: 03624
- Census code: 303864

Barkuriha is a village in Nalbari district, Assam, India. As per 2011 Census of India, Barkuriha has a population of 2915 people with a literacy rate of 90.39%.

Barkuriha village had a history of militancy affected area.
