= Mugkuchi =

Village in Assam, India

- Village
- Map of Assam Mugkuchi (India)
- Coordinates: 26.4327°N 91.4556°E
- Country: India
- State: Assam
- District: Nalbari
- Gram Panchayat: Pub Bahjani

Area
  - Total: 136.3 ha (337 acres)

Population (2011)
  - Total: 2,423
  - Density: 1,778/km^{2} (4,604/sq mi)

Languages
  - Official: Assamese
- Time zone: UTC+5:30 (IST)
- Postal code: 781334
- STD Code: 03624
- Vehicle registration: AS-14
- Census code: 303958

Mugkuchi is a census village in Nalbari district, Assam, India. As per the 2011 Census of India, Mugkuchi village has a total population of 2,423 people including 1,240 males and 1,183 females with a literacy rate of 80.07%.

Mugkuchi village is known for Jaapi artisans.
