= Bhatheli =

Hindu festival

Bhatheli (Assamese: ভঠেলি), also known as Paowra Tola, is a Hindu festival mainly celebrated in North Kamrup, Assam. The festival is held in the month of Vaisakha. In northern Kamrup, it is referred to as "Bhatheli", while in southern Kamrup, it goes by the names "Sori" or "Suanri". In Goalpara, it is known as Sori, and in Darrang, it is called "Deul". Where in the Bajali area of north Kamrup a bamboo is kept against a Banyan tree called "Madan Mohan Gosain", (Note: the bamboo is called "Madan Mohan Gosain") a name of Krishna.

Banikanta Kakati draws attention towards similarity between Bhatheli and ancient Indradhwaja festival. The Indradhwaja festival is described as "Sakrotthana" in the Kalika Purana, and it took place around a pole with flags. The procedures for the festival as described in the Kalika Purana approximate the preparations to be made for the celebrations of Bhatheli of the present days. Barring minor details, the two festivals appear to be the same.

== Celebration ==
Each area is decorated with a long bamboo with flag and streamers. The one who adjusts best is called the bride-groom couple. The others, who are termed brides, then surround the bamboo in a circle, and a mock marriage ceremony is performed. One of the main features of the festival is the planting of two green bamboos. On the fixed date in the morning young men take purifying baths. They cut two bamboos and decorated it with coloured cloth and cowries, followed by celebrations with music and instruments. A large scale fair accompanied with trading of different commodities.
