= Amati (ritual) =

Amati, also known as Ambuvachi, is a ritual followed in Kamrup and Goalpara regions in Western Assam. It is an ancient fertility cult and also incorporated into the mother goddess cult as Kamakhya as its centre.

== Practices ==
By tradition, during ritual days mother earth is believed passing through menstrual period and thus to be in an unclean state. Hence on those days farmers would not till the soil or plant any seeds. Orthodox widows and Brahmins(especially Rajbongshi)abstain from any food except fruits. All household items are believed to have come into contact with impurity and are cleaned once the Amati period is over.

== Symbolism ==
The idea of earth's menstruation is symbolic of the belief in her productive capacity which naturally activated after the onset of the wet weather.

== Ambuvachi Mela ==
The end of Amati days is celebrated with a fair known as "Ambuvachi Mela" in Kamakhya Temple complex and opening of main doors of temple after brief closure during Amati days.
