= Barbhag =

Barbhag is a revenue circle of Nalbari district, Assam, India.

The river Pagladiya is the life line of this area. Guwahati is about 45 km from this place via Hajo-Nalbari road.

Barbhag College is the educational hub for this area.

BAR means "Large" and BHAG means "Part". It is said that in ancient time, the king collected a large part of revenue from this area. That is why it was named as Barbhag.
