= Kamarupi Prakrit =

Middle Indo-Aryan language used in ancient Kamarupa, Indian subcontinent

- Kamarupi Apabhramsa
- Modern descendants of Kamarupi Apabhramsa.
- Pronunciation: Kāmarūpī Prākrit
- Region: Kamarupa
- Era: First millennium
- Language family: Indo-European: Indo-Iranian; Indo-Aryan; Eastern; Kamarupi Prakrit
- Early form: Magadhi Prakrit
- Writing system: Ancient Kamarupi script

Language codes
- ISO 639-3: –
- Glottolog: None
- Coordinates: 26.15°N 90.81°E

Kamarupi Prakrit is the postulated Middle Indo-Aryan (MIA) Prakrit language used in ancient Kamarupa (5th–12th century). This language has been derived from Gauda-Kamarupi Prakrit and the historical ancestor of the Kamatapuri lects and the modern Assamese language; and can be dated prior to 1250 CE, when the proto-Kamta language, the parent of the Kamatapuri lects, began to develop. Though not substantially proven, the existence of the language that predated the Kamatapuri lects and modern Assamese is widely believed to be descended from it.

The evidence of this MIA exist in systematic errors in the Sanskrit language used in the Kamarupa inscriptions. A distinguishing characteristic of Kamarupa inscriptions is the replacement of ś and ṣ by s, which is contrary to Vararuci's rule, the main characteristic of Magadhi Prakrit, which warrants that ṣ and s are replaced by ś. Linguists claim this apabhramsa gave rise to various eastern Indo-European languages like modern Assamese and felt its presence in the form of Kamrupi and Kamatapuri lects.

== Etymology of various names ==
The speech is known by different names, which generally consists of two words — prefix such as 'Kamrupi', 'Kamarupi', 'Kamarupa' referring to Kamarupa and suffixes 'dialect', 'Apabhramsa', sometimes 'Prakrit'. Suniti Kumar Chatterji named it as Kamarupa dialect (the dialect of Magadhi) as spoken in Kamarupa. Sukumar Sen and others calls it as old Kamrupi dialect; the speech used in old Kamrup. Some scholars termed it as Kamrupi Apabhramsa, Kamarupi language or proto-Kamrupa.

== Characteristics ==
The proto-languages of the eastern Magadhan languages. Kamarupa Prakrit corresponds to ?proto-Kamarupa here, a hitherto un-reconstructed proto-language. The period corresponds to earlier than 1250 CE, when proto-Kamata began to innovate unique features.

Though the epigraphs were written in classical Sanskrit in kavya style of a high degree, they abound in forms varying from the standard.

- Loss of repha and reduplication of the remaining concerned consonants.
- Shortening of vowels.
- Lengthening of vowels.
- Substitution of one vowel for another.
- Avoidance and irregularity of sandhis.
- Loss of initial vowel.
- Substitution of Y by i.
- Total loss of medial Y.
- Reduplication of consonants immediately followed by r.
- Absence of duplication where it is otherwise necessary.
- Varieties of assimilation.
- Wrong analogy.
- Varied substitution for m and final m.
- Substitution of h by gh and substitution of bh by h.
- Indiscriminate substitution of one sibilant for another.
- Irregularity of declension in case of stems ending in consonants.
- Absence of visarga even where it is invariably necessary.

== Apabhramsa ==
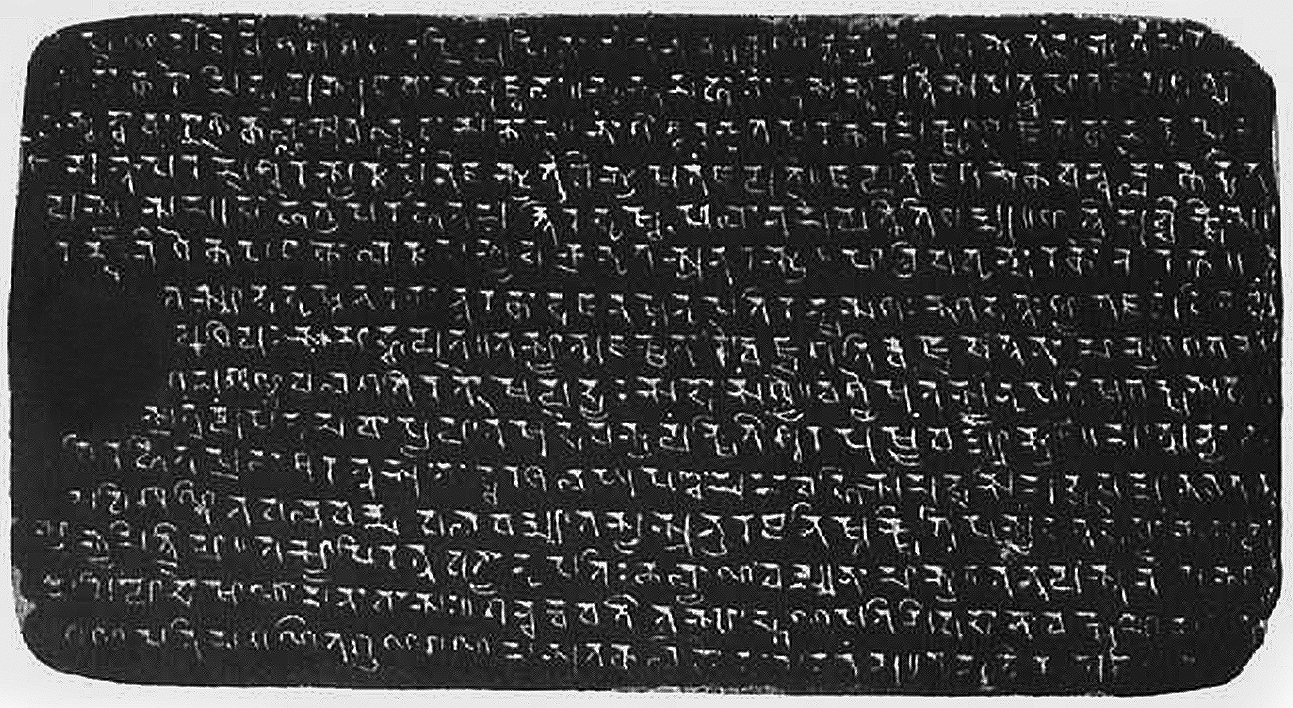
Like other inscriptions from Kingdom of Kamarupa which were written in Sanskrit, the Nidhanpur inscription of Bhaskar Varman shows "mistakes" and have few Apabhramsa terms due to influence of a local Apabhramsa.

Xuanzang (or Hiuen Tsang), when he visited Kamarupa in 643 CE mentioned that the language spoken in Kamarupa was a 'little different' from the one spoken in mid-India (Magadha) is provided as evidence that this Apabhramsa existed as early as the 7th century.

== Geographical vicinity ==
Charyapada

Assamese, or more appropriately the old Kamarupi dialect entered into Kamrup or western Assam, where this speech was first characterised as Assamese.

Golockchandra Goswami in his An Introduction to Assamese Phonology writes, "...in early Assamese there seems to be one dominant dialect prevailing over the whole country, the Western Assamese dialect." Similarly Upendranath Goswami says, "Assamese entered into Kamarupa or western Assam where this speech was first characterised as Assamese. This is evident from the remarks of Hiuen Tsang who visited the Kingdom of Kamarupa in the first half of the seventh century A.D., during the reign of Bhaskaravarman."

== Works ==
The sample of the old Kamrupi dialect are found in different inscriptions scattered around eastern and northern India, such as Bhaskar Varman's inscriptions. Daka, a native of Lehidangara village of Barpeta composed an authoritative work named Dakabhanita in the 8th century A.D.

== See also ==
- Apabhraṃśa
- Middle Indo-Aryan languages

== Bibliography ==
- Chatterji (1926). The Origin and Development of the Bengali Language.
- Hazarika, Parikshit (1968). "The Kamarupi Apabhramsa". Journal of the Assam Research Society. 18: 77–85.
- Goswami, Upendra Nath (1970). A study on Kāmrūpī: a dialect of Assamese. Dept. of Historical Antiquarian Studies, Assam.
- Sharma, Mukunda Madhava (1978). Inscriptions of Ancient Assam. Guwahati, Assam: Gauhati University.
- Toulmin, Mathew W S (2006). Reconstructing linguistic history in a dialect continuum: The Kamta, Rajbanshi, and Northern Deshi Bangla subgroup of Indo-Aryan (Ph.D.). The Australian National University.
