= Subdivision in India =

Administrative division of an Indian district

A sub-division is an administrative division of a district in India. In some states (Andhra Pradesh, Telangana, Tamil Nadu, Kerala) they are called Revenue Divisions. It is headed by a sub-divisional magistrate (also known as assistant collector or assistant commissioner). In some states, the post is designated as Revenue Divisional Officer (RDO) or Sub-Divisional Officer (Civil).

Subdivisions, also known as revenue divisions in some states, are designed primarily for land revenue administration and related purposes. These subdivisions serve as an intermediate tier between the district and the tehsil/taluk/subdistrict levels, encompassing multiple of these smaller administrative units. Their core functions revolve around the management of land records, the collection of land taxes, and the implementation of land-related policies, facilitating efficient governance and resource management at the local level.

A district may have multiple sub-divisions, and each of those sub-divisions may contain multiple sub-districts (tehsils/C.D. Blocks) and municipalities. For example, in West Bengal, the Murshidabad district contains five sub-divisions (mahakumas)

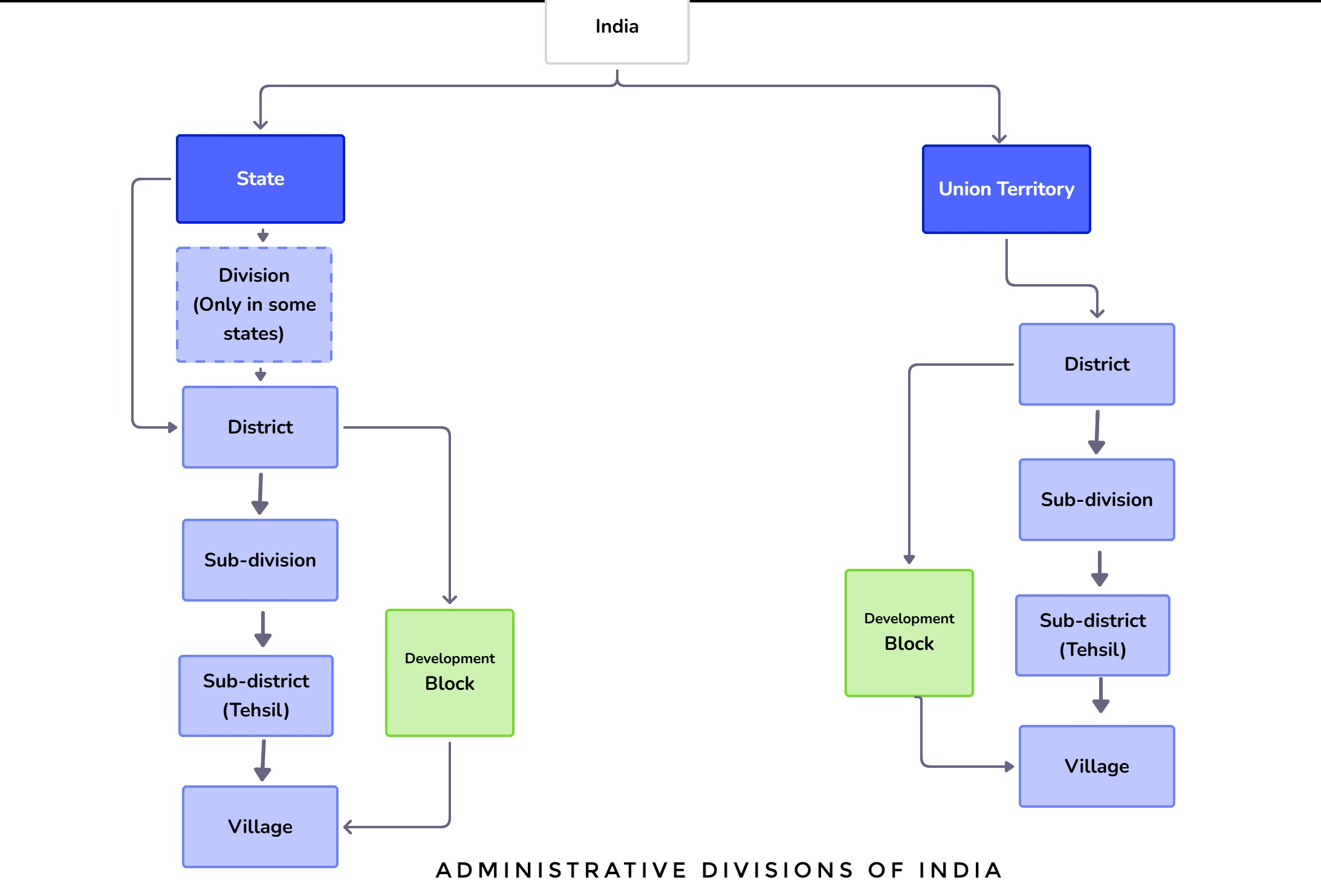
Visual representation of India's administrative hierarchy from state to village level.

== Revenue division ==
A Revenue division should not be confused with divisions of a state. States are divided into multiple divisions (headed by divisional commissioners in some states), and these divisions are further divided into districts (headed by district magistrates, collectors, or deputy commissioners).

== Odisha ==
Revenue division is not synonymous with sub-division in every Indian state. In Odisha, a division is known as "revenue division" and divisional commissioner as Revenue Divisional Commissioner (RDC), while revenue divisions within a district are strictly known as sub-divisions. The constitution of revenue divisions and the appointment of Revenue Divisional Commissioners is as per the Orissa Revenue Divisional Commissioners Act, 1957.

== See also ==
- List of divisions in India
- Village accountant
