= Kamrup region =

Kamrup Kamarupa
- Region
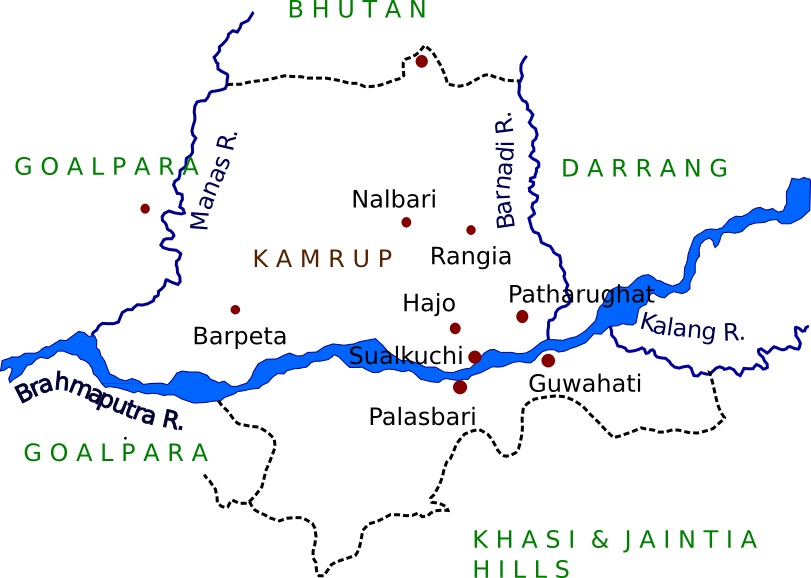
- Coordinates: 26.25°N 91.5°E
- Country: India
- Ancient capital: Pragjyotishpura, Durjaya
- City: Barpeta, Guwahati, Nalbari, Palashbari, Rangiya

Population (2011)
  - Total: 6,000,000
- Time zone: UTC+5.30 (UTC+05:30 (IST))
- Area codes: 0361
- Website: www.barpeta.nic.in www.kamrupmetro.nic.in www.kamrup.nic.in www.nalbari.nic.in

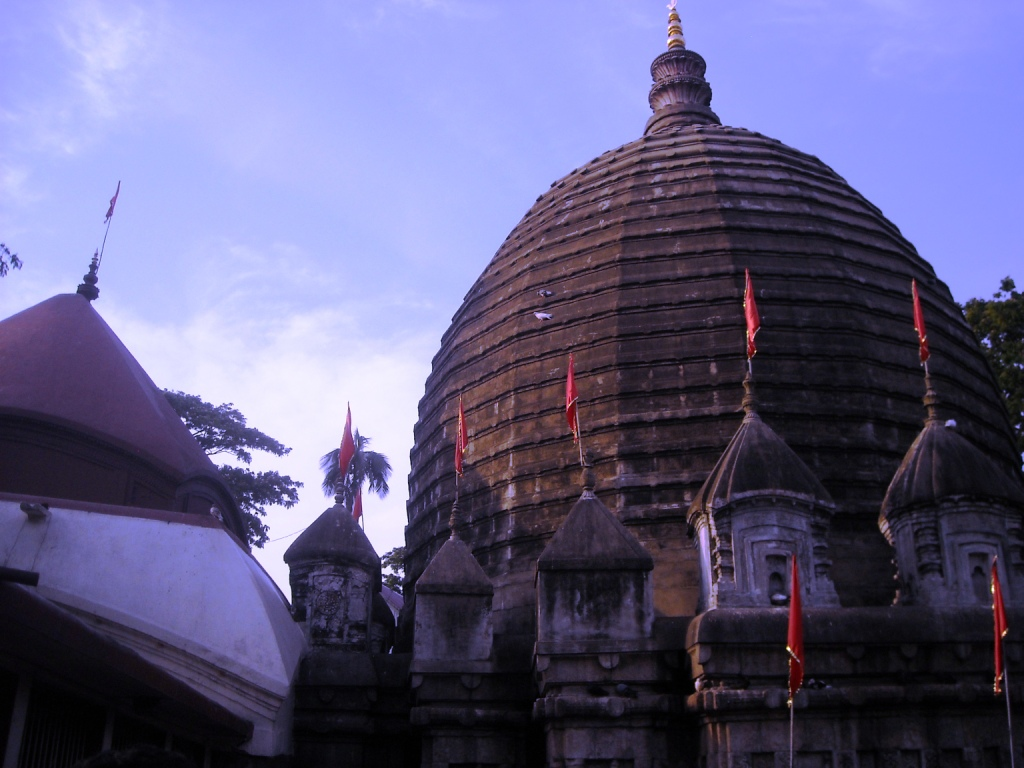
Ancient Kamakhya temple

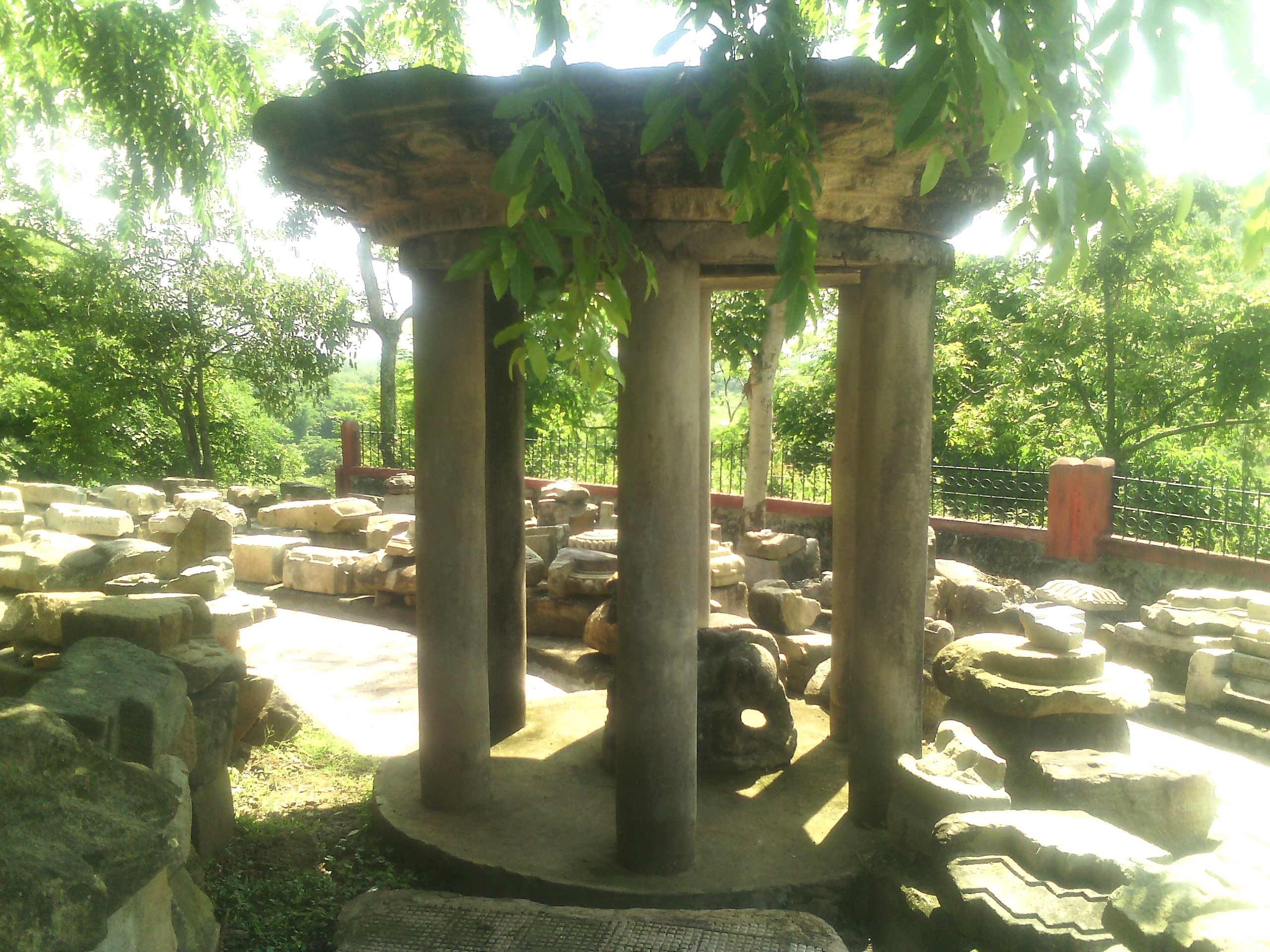
Madan Kamdev, Baihata

Kamrup is the modern region situated between two rivers, the Manas and the Barnadi in Western Assam, with the same territorial extent as the Colonial and post-Colonial "Undivided Kamrup district". It was the capital region of two of the three dynasties of Kamarupa and Guwahati, the current political center of Assam, is situated here. It is characterized by its cultural artifacts.

== Etymology ==
The origin of name, its original form being Kamarupa, is attributed to a legend in the Kalika Purana which mentions that it is in this region that Kamadeva regained his form.

== Ancient Kamrup (350–1140) ==
The history of the Kamrup region dates back to the 4th century under Kamarupa Kingdom. The kingdom was successively ruled by three dynasties - the Varman, the Mlechchha (Salasthambha dynasty) and the Pala dynasties. Among these, the capitals of the Varman Dynasty and the Pala Dynasty, called Pragjyotishpura and Durjaya respectively, were in Kamrup, whereas the capital of the Mlechchha dynasty was in Tezpur outside the Kamrup region.

Samudragupta's 4th-century Allahabad prasasti mention Kamarupa as well as Davaka (Nagaon district in central Assam) and it is presumed that a later Kamarupa king absorbed Davaka. Though the kingdom came to be known as Kamarupa, the kings called themselves the rulers of Pragjyotisha (Pragjyotishadhipati), and not Kamarupa. Vaidydeva, an 11th-century ruler, named Kamarupa as a mandala within the Pragjyotisha bhukti. According to Sircar, the Kamarupa mandala is congruent to undivided Kamrup of the modern times.

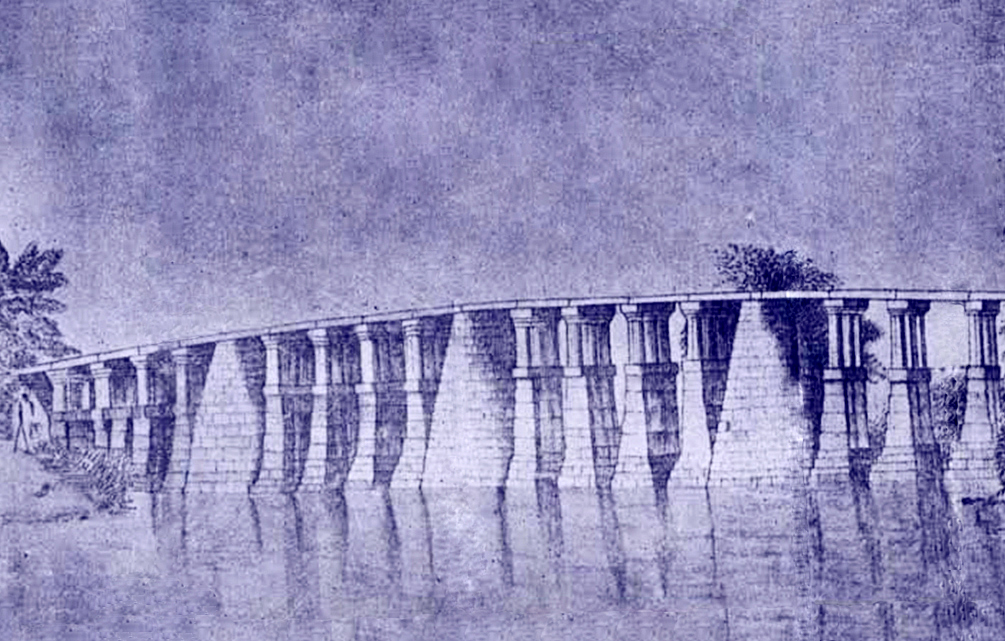
Historic Silsako bridge

== Medieval Kamrup ==
=== Kamata (1250-1581) ===
The Kamarupa region soon lost a unified political rule. Sandhya, a 13th-century ruler in the Kamarupanagara (North Guwahati), moved his capital to present-day North Bengal and his new kingdom came to be called Kamata; or sometimes as Kamata-Kamrup. Though Kamata included Koch Bihar, Darrang, Kamrup districts, and northern Mymensingh in general, its control over the Kamrup region was lax. In the extreme east of the erstwhile Kamarupa kingdom the Chutiya, Kachari and the Ahom kingdoms emerged, with the Baro-Bhuyans in Kamrup, Nagaon, Lakhimpur and Darrang providing the buffer between these kingdoms in the east and the Kamata kingdom in the west.

=== Koch Hajo (1581-1612) ===
In the beginning of the 16th century Viswa Singha filled the vacuum left by the destruction of the Khen dynasty of Kamata and consolidated his rule over the Baro-Bhuyan chieftains ruling over the Kamrup region, and by the time of Naranarayana, the kingdom extended a firm rule between the Karatoya and the Bhareli rivers. Even though the Koch kings called themselves Kamateshwars (lords of Kamata), their kingdom came to be called the Koch kingdom and not as Kamrup.

In 1581 the Koch kingdom was bifurcated with Raghudev gaining control over the portion to the east of the Sankosh River up to the Bharali River in the north bank; and east of the Brahmaputra in present-day Bangladesh. Raghudev's kingdom came to be called Koch Hajo in Muslim chronicles, and Kamrup in Ekasarana documents. As the Mughal established the rule of the Bengal Subah in Dhaka, Koch Bihar entered into an alliance with them against Parikshitnarayana, the son and successor of Raghudev. The Mughals pushed eastward, removed Parikshit from power and consolidated power right up to the eastern border of Kamrup by 1615 (up to the Barnadi River). Though the Mughals pushed further east they came into direct military conflict with the Ahom kingdom and finally settled the boundary at Barnadi River following the Treaty of Asurar Ali in 1639.

=== Sarkar Kamrup (1612-1682) ===
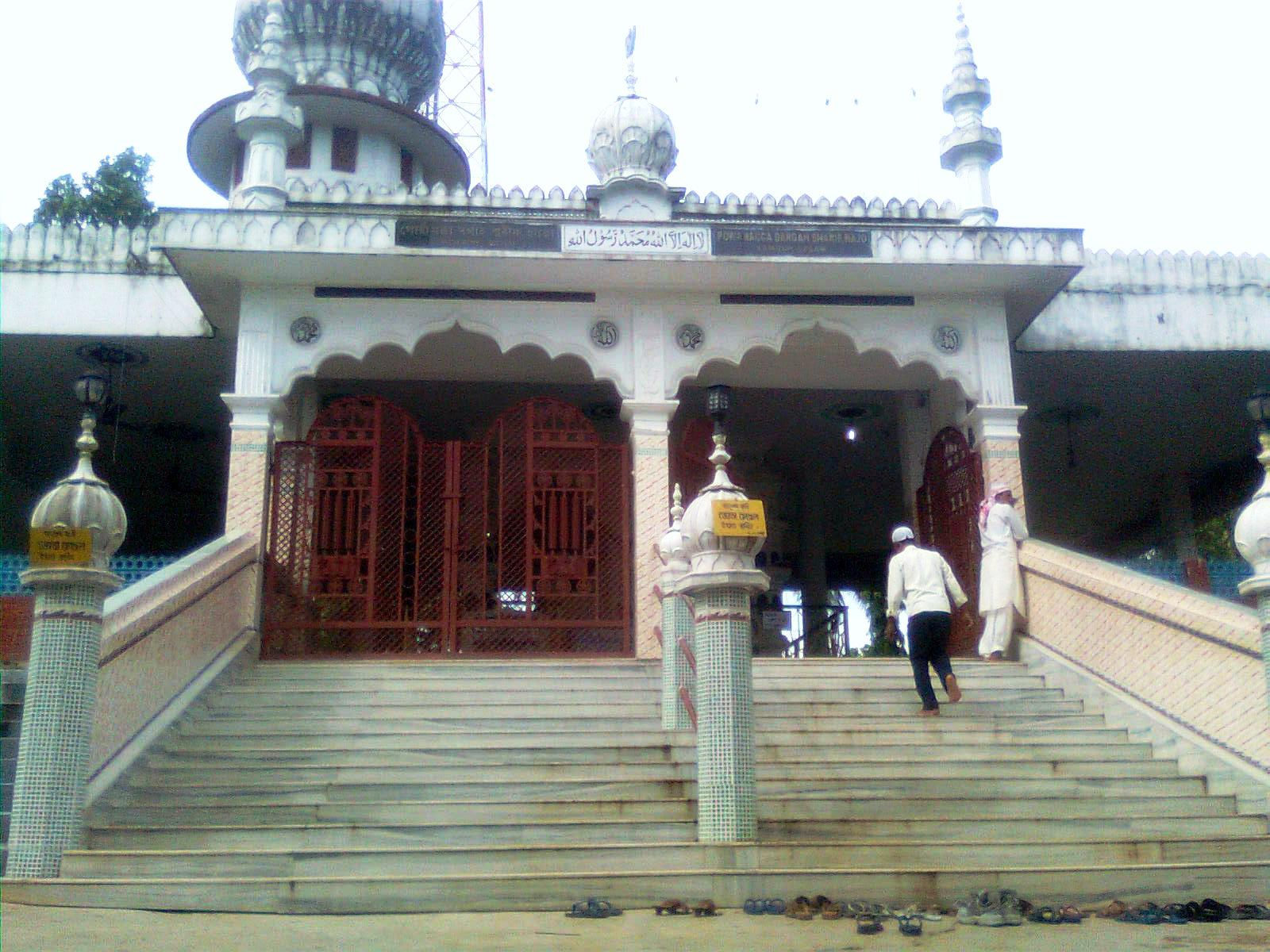
Ahom King Rudra Singha, is said to have continued to pay great attention to Powa Makkah Mosque in Hajo even after the expulsion of the Mughals from Assam in 1682.

The Mughals established four sarkars in the newly acquired land---among which were Dhekeri (between Sankosh and Manas) and Kamrup (between Manas and Barnadi). Kamrup was also renamed as Shujabad, after Shah Shuja, the Subahdar of Bengal. The Mughal governors were called Faujdars of Shujabad. The sixth faujdar, Lutfullah Shirazi, built a hilltop mosque in Koch Hajo in 1657. The mosque contained the mazar (mausoleum) of Prince Ghiyath ad-Din Awliya of Iraq, who is commonly credited for introducing Islam to the region. The Mughals lost Kamrup forever in 1682 after the Battle of Itakhuli. Incomplete list of Faujdars of Guahati:

1. Makram Khan (1612-1614)
2. Mir Sufi (1614-1616)
3. Shaykh Kamal (1616-1632)
4. Abd as-Salam (1632-1638)
5. Noorullah (1638-1656)
6. Lutfullah Shirazi (1656-1658)

=== Borphukan's domain (1682-1820) ===
After the Battle of Itakhuli (1682), the Ahom kingdom established control over Sarkar Kamrup, and it became the domain of the Borphukan, based in Guwahati. The region continued to be called Kamrup and its eastern and western boundaries were identical to the later British district. In addition to the Kamrup region, the Borphukan's domain included the additional region to the east up to Kaliabor. The Koch prince that oversaw Darrang, too, reported to the Borphukan. The Ahoms did not impose their administrative system fully over Kamrup, and the resultant pargana-based system was a mixed Mughal-Ahom system, in contrast to the Paik system in the rest of the kingdom in the east.

=== Burmese empire (1821-1824) ===
The region became part of the Burmese empire between 1821 and 1824.

== Colonial Kamrup (1833–1947) ==
The region came under Burmese control in 1822. The British, who had held territories west of the Manas River since the transfer of Bengal in 1765, advanced into Guwahati on 28 March 1824 at the onset of the First Anglo-Burmese War. By October of the same year, they had established administrative control over the area.

The Kamrup district, constituted by the British between 1833 and 1836, was largely congruent with the Mughal Sarkar of Kamrup established in 1639.

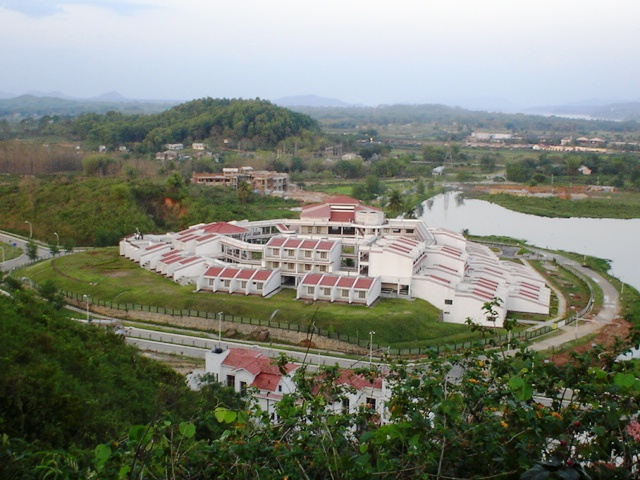
Indian Institute of Technology in North Guwahati

== Modern Kamrup ==
After Indian Independence in 1947, the Kamrup district maintained its form. The district was divided, beginning in 1983, and the original district is occasionally called "Undivided Kamrup district". The Kamapitha, Sarkar Kamrup of 1639 and the Undivided Kamrup district from the Colonial as well as the Independent periods is today defined as the Kamrup.

== See also ==
- Kamrupi
- Dewangiri

== Bibliography ==
- Bannerje, A C (1992). "Chapter 1: The New Regime, 1826-31". In Barpujari, H K (ed.). The Comprehensive History of Assam: Modern Period. Vol. IV. Guwahati: Publication Board, Assam. pp. 1–43.
- Gogoi, Jahnabi (2002), Agrarian System Of Medieval Assam, New Delhi: Concept Publishing Company
- Nath, D (1989), History of the Koch Kingdom: 1515-1615, Delhi: Mittal Publications
- Neog, Maheshwar (1980). Early History of the Vaishnava Faith and Movement in Assam. Delhi: Motilal Banarasidass.
- Puri, Baij Nath (1968). Studies in Early History and Administration in Assam. Gauhati University.
- Sarkar, J. N. (1992), "Chapter II The Turko-Afghan Invasions", in Barpujari, H. K. (ed.), The Comprehensive History of Assam, vol. 2, Guwahati: Assam Publication Board, pp. 35–48
- Sarkar, J. N. (2007), "Chapter I: The Ahom Administration", in Barpujari, H. K. (ed.), The Comprehensive History of Assam, vol. 3, Guwahati: Assam Publication Board, pp. 1–86
- Sircar, D C (1990), "Pragjyotisha-Kamarupa", in Barpujari, H K (ed.), The Comprehensive History of Assam, vol. I, Guwahati: Publication Board, Assam, pp. 59–78
- Sharma, Benudhar, ed. (1972). An Account of Assam. Gauhati: Assam Jyoti.
