= Lower Assam division =

- Division
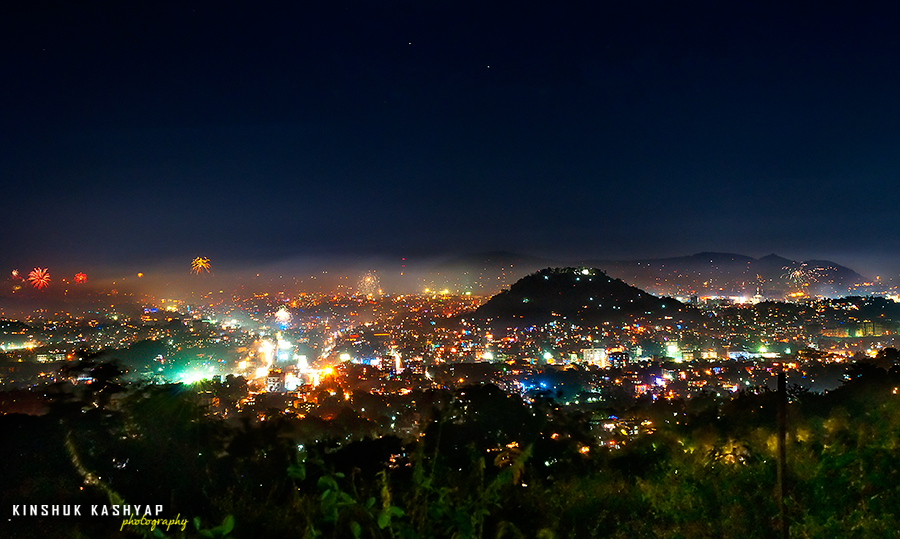
- Guwahati is the important and most developed city in Lower Assam division

- The five divisions of Assam
- Country: India
- State: Assam
- Capital: Guwahati
- Largest City: Guwahati

Government
  - DC: Shri Jayant Narlikar, IAS

Area
  - Total: 22,024 km^{2} (8,504 sq mi)

Population (2011 census)
  - Total: 11,252,365
  - Density: 510.91/km^{2} (1,323.3/sq mi)
- Time zone: UTC+05:30 (IST)
- Website: assam.gov.in

Lower Assam division is one of the 5 administrative divisions of Assam in India. It was formed in 1874, consisting of the undivided Kamrup district of Western Assam, undivided Darrang and Nagaon districts of Central Assam and Khasi & Jaintia hills of Meghalaya, created for revenue purposes.

== History ==
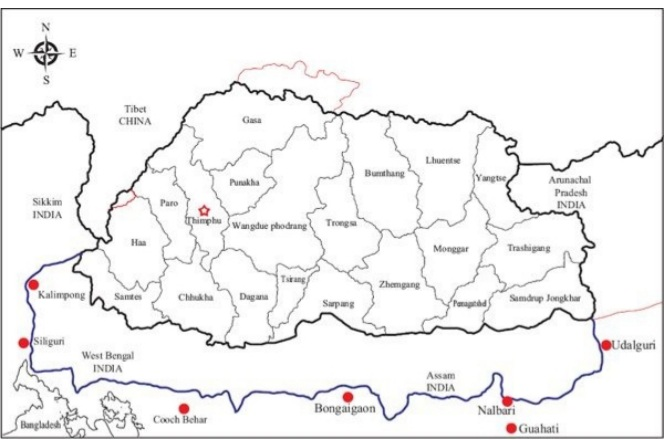
Some parts of Lower Assam and North Bengal were under the Kingdom of Bhutan before the 1865 Duar War

Around 1498-1502, Sultan Alauddin Hussain Shah of Gaur conquered parts of Lower Assam during the Bengal-Kamata War. The Sultan appointed his son, Shahzada Danyal, as the governor of the newly conquered region; that reached up to Hajo and intended to expand to Central Assam. Danyal governed Kamata for several more years until the Assamese Bhuyans led by Harup Narayan led a campaign against him. In this campaign, the Bhuyans seized and killed Danyal and his officers, thus ending the Sultanate's short rule over the territory some time before 1509. Musundar Ghazi succeeded Danyal as Bengal's representative in Kamrup. Some parts of Lower assam districts were under rule of the Kingdom of Bhutan until the 19th century.

== Districts ==
Lower Assam division contains 12 districts, namely Dhubri, South Salamara, Kokrajhar, Chirang, Bongaigaon, Goalpara, Barpeta, Bajali, Nalbari, Baksa, Kamrup and Kamrup metropolitan. Among these, 3 districts namely Kokrajhar, Chirang and Baksa lie within Bodoland.

Code	District	Headquarter	Population (2011)	Area (km²)	Density (/km²)
BK	Baksa^{#}	Mushalpur	950,075	2,457	387
-	Bajali	Pathsala	253,816	600	423
BP	Barpeta	Barpeta	1,439,806	2,645	544
BO	Bongaigaon	Bongaigaon	738,804	1,093	676
CH	Chirang^{#}	Kajalgaon	482,162	1,170	412
DU	Dhubri	Dhubri	1,394,144	1,608	867
GP	Goalpara	Goalpara	1,008,183	1,824	553
KM	Kamrup Metropolitan	Guwahati	1,253,938	1,528	821
KU	Kamrup	Rangia	1,517,542	3,105	489
KJ	Kokrajhar^{#}	Kokrajhar	887,142	3,169	280
NB	Nalbari	Nalbari	771,639	2,257	342
SSM	South Salmara-Mankachar	Hatsingimari	555,114	568	977
Total	12	—	1,12,52,365	22,024	511

^{#} Districts within the Bodoland Territorial Region

== Demographics ==
As per the 2011 census, Lower Assam division has a population of 11,501,873 people.

=== Languages ===
Languages spoken in Lower Assam Division (2011)
1. Assamese (53.0%)
2. Bengali (30.9%)
3. Boro (7.73%)
4. Hindi (2.83%)
5. Others (5.56%)

According to the 2011 census, the total number of Assamese speakers in the division were 59,61,583, Bengali speakers were 34,76,953, Boro speakers were 8,70,198 and Hindi speakers were 3,17,958. Although the Bengali speaking population was 30.9% as per the 2011 census language report, Lower Assam Division is home to a large Muslim population of Bengali origin, most of whom now identify as Assamese speakers in the census.

=== Religion ===
Total population of Lower Assam Division is 11,501,873. Among them, Hindus are 5,659,063, Muslims are 5,474,223 and 368,587 follow other religions.

Religion in Lower Assam Division (2011)
1. Hinduism (49.2%)
2. Islam (47.6%)
3. Others (3.21%)

District	Hindu	Muslim	Other
Kamrup Metropolitan	84.89	12.05	3.06
Kamrup	57.82	39.66	2.52
Dubri	26.07	73.49	0.44
Goalpara	34.51	57.52	7.97
Barpeta	22.27	77.58	0.15
Bongaigaon	48.61	50.22	1.17
South Salmara Mankachar	4.49	95.19	0.32
Chirang	66.50	22.66	10.84
Kokrajhar	59.64	28.44	11.92
Nalbari	69.11	30.56	0.33
Bajali	67.90	31.91	0.19
Baksa	82.40	14.29	2.32

== See also ==
- Upper Assam Division
- Central Assam division
- North Assam division
- Barak Valley

== Sources ==
- Baruah, S L (1986), A Comprehensive History of Assam, New Delhi: Munshiram Manoharlal Publishers Pvt. Ltd.
- Nath, D. (1989), History of the Koch Kingdom, C. 1515–1615, Mittal Publications, ISBN 8170991099, archived from the original on 3 May 2023
- Phuntsho, Karma (2013). The History of Bhutan. Penguin Books. ISBN 9781908323583.
- Sarkar, J. N. (1992), "Chapter II The Turko-Afghan Invasions", in Barpujari, H. K. (ed.), The Comprehensive History of Assam, vol. 2, Guwahati: Assam Publication Board, pp. 35–48
