= Nalbari district =

Coordinates: 26°27′00″N 91°26′24″E

- District of Assam
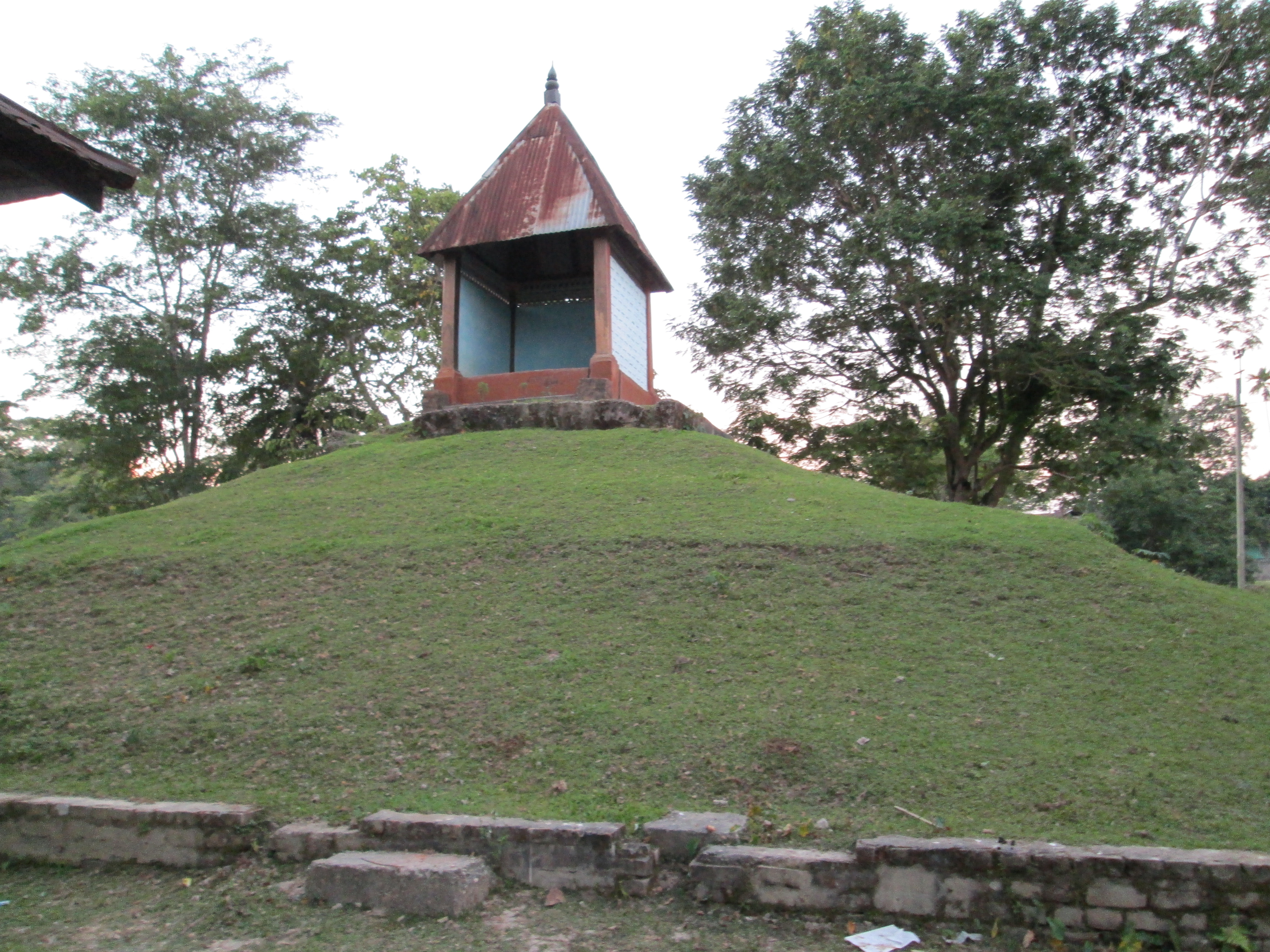
- Daul Mandir

- Location in Assam
- Nalbari district
- Country: India
- State: Assam
- Division: Lower Assam
- Headquarters: Nalbari

Government
  - Lok Sabha constituencies: Barpeta
  - Vidhan Sabha constituencies: Nalbari, Barkhetri, Tihu

Area
  - Total: 1,052 km^{2} (406 sq mi)

Population (2011)
  - Total: 771,639
  - Density: 733.5/km^{2} (1,900/sq mi)

Demographics
  - Literacy: 79.89%
  - Sex ratio: 945
- Time zone: UTC+05:30 (IST)
- ISO 3166 code: IN-AS
- Website: http://nalbari.nic.in/

Nalbari district (/nɔːlˈbɑːri/) is an administrative district in the state of Assam in India. The district headquarters is located at Nalbari. The district derives its name from the combination of two words, "Nal" and "Bar."

It is situated in the lower region of the Brahmaputra Valley and shares its borders with Baksa, Kamrup, Bajali, Barpeta, and Tamulpur districts.

== History ==
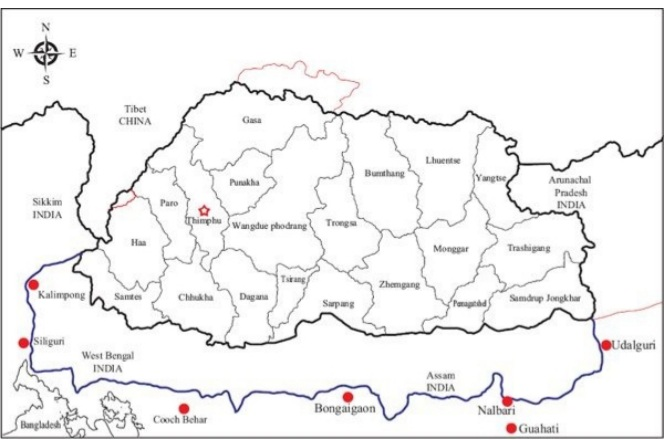
The Northern part of present-day Nalbari was under the Kingdom of Bhutan before the 1865 Duar War

Nalbari was declared a sub division of undivided Kamrup District in 1967. The district was created on 14 August 1985 when it was split from Kamrup district. 1 June 2004 saw the formation of Baksa District from parts of three districts, including Nalbari.

== Geography ==
Nalbari district occupies an area of 2,257 square kilometres (871 sq mi), The latitude of Nalbari is 26 degrees north and 27 degrees north and the longitude is 91 degrees east and 97 degrees east. The tributaries of the Brahmaputra, the Nona, Buradia, Pagladia, Ghogra, Borolia and Tihu, which originate in the foothills of the Himalayan Range, are wild in nature and make an enormous contribution to the agrarian economy of the district.

== Administration ==
Varnali Deka, IAS is the current District Commissioner of Nalbari district.

== Demographics ==
Historical population
Year	Pop.	±% p.a.
1901	91,724	—
1911	103,949	+1.26%
1921	118,705	+1.34%
1931	151,846	+2.49%
1941	196,535	+2.61%
1951	231,698	+1.66%
1961	329,736	+3.59%
1971	429,760	+2.68%
1991	603,307	+1.71%
2001	689,053	+1.34%
2011	771,639	+1.14%

According to the 2011 census Nalbari district has a population of 771,639, This gives it a ranking of 488th in India (out of a total of 640). The district has a population density of 763 inhabitants per square kilometre (1,980/sq mi) . Its population growth rate over the decade 2001-2011 was 11.74%. Nalbari has a sex ratio of 945 females for every 1000 males, and a literacy rate of 79.89%. 10.72% of the population lives in urban areas. Scheduled Castes and Scheduled Tribes made up 7.80% and 3.03% of the population respectively.

Religions in Nalbari District (2011)
Religion	Percent
Hinduism	69.11%
Islam	30.56%
Other or not stated	0.33%

Population of circles by religion
Circle	Hindus	Muslims	Others
Tihu (Pt)	96.44%	3.23%	0.33%
Pachim Nalbari	76.74%	23.07%	0.19%
Barkhetri	26.54%	73.23%	0.23%
Barbhag	80.25%	19.56%	0.19%
Nalbari	78.91%	20.28%	0.81%
Banekuchi	66.59%	33.22%	0.19%
Ghograpar (Pt)	65.04%	34.78%	0.18%
Baganpara (Pt)	73.60%	26.34%	0.06%
Barama (Pt)	53.18%	46.73%	0.09%

Hindu population in the district is 533,280 (69.11%), while Muslim population is 235,813 (30.56%) according to 2011 census. In 1971, Hindus were overwhelming majority in Nalbari district with forming 83.7% of the population, while Muslims were 15.4% at that time.

Languages spoken in Nalbari district (2011)
1. Assamese (85.9%)
2. Bengali (11.0%)
3. Boro (2.53%)
4. Hindi (0.48%)
5. Others (0.12%)

According to the 2011 census, 85.87% of the population spoke Assamese, 11.00% Bengali and 2.53% Boro as their first language, while other, including Hindi, constitute 0.60% of the total population.

== Religious places ==
- Bilbeswar Devalaya

Bilbeswar Devalaya in Belsor of Nalbari district is an ancient Hindu temple and is dedicated to Lord Shiva.

- Balilecha (Balilesa) Kali Mandir

It's an ancient temple of Goddess Kali. Although the ancient temple is in ruins, a newly constructed temple stands tall at the site. It's a highly revered religious shrine of Nalbari district.

- Basudev Devalaya

Basudev Devalaya in Balikaria of Nalbari district is an ancient Hindu temple and is dedicated to Basudev.

- Ganga Pukhuri

Ganga Pukhuri is a large pond situated in Barkuriha of Nalbari district. Every year there is a festival held in Ganga Pukhuri on Ashok Astami and devotees throng here from different parts of the country to pay homages to departed souls.

- Thetha Gohain Than

Thetha Gohain Than in Dokoha of Nalbari district is a Hindu temple dedicated to Lord Krishna.

== Education ==
The rate of total literacy of the Nalbari District, according to 2011 census, is 79.89% as against 80.95% in 2001. The rural literacy rate is 78.44%, while the urban rate is 91.46%. Male literacy is 85.58% consisting of Rural 84.38% and Urban 95.24%. Female literacy is 73.85% consisting of Rural 72.14% and Urban 87.48%. The total literacy rate of the state as a whole is 73.18%.

== See also ==
- Villages of Nalbari District
