= Kamrupi people =

Linguistic group in Assam, India

Kamrupi
Regions with significant populations

Languages
- Kamrupi dialect of Assamese

Religion
- Hinduism, Islam, Christianity

Related ethnic groups
- Other Indo-Aryan peoples

The Kamrupi people are a linguistic group that speak the Kamrupi dialects of Assamese and are found in the colonial Kamrup district region of Assam, India.

== Festivals ==
Bihu, Durga Puja, Kali Puja, Diwali, Holi, Janmastami, Shivratri to name a few, are major festivals of the region. Muslims celebrate Eid. Though dance and music of the springtime Bihu from Eastern Assam was not as common in the past they are becoming popular now; in its stead "Bhatheli" in northern Kamrup, "Sori" or "Suanri" in southern Kamrup were traditional modes of celebrations. In certain areas the breakers of the "bhatheli-ghar" come from another village, resulting in a sort of mock fight between them and the local youth. In the southern part of Kamrup, where the festival is known as Sori, planting of tall bamboos is not seen, but bamboo posts, with the tuft at the top. People bow before the bamboos in northern Kamrup and they also touch them with reverence, but it does not look like any sort of bamboo worship. The common popular term to designate the three festivals corresponding to Bihu of Eastern Assam, in Western Assam, except in West Goalpara, is "Domahi", e.g., "Baihagar Domahi", "Maghar Domahi" and "Katir Domahi".

== Religion ==
Hinduism is the major religion of the region.

After sankardev Neo vaishnav movement the Hinduism of Kamrupa further divided into Neo Vaishnavism and Shaktism. Worshipping Vishnu / Krishna was introduced for the first time and North Indian purity satvic ruled applied on Kamrupi People. Vaishnav missionaries migrated to convert the indigenous shakta kamrupi hindu into Neo Vaishnav. The Neo Vaishnavism made boar meat, alcohol, chicken taboo in kamrupa. Shakta of Kamrupa accept pashubali as valid and preserve the culture of ancient kamrupa. Shakta of Kamrupa observed all pancha deva puja ( vishnu, shiva, durga, surya, Ganpati) while Neo Vaishnav only pray to krishna and don't follow vedic rituals.

== Music ==
Kamrupi Lokgeet performance, presented by Khanindra Deka and Bhagaban Deka

The folk songs of Kamrup region is known as Kamrupi Lokgeet. Kamrupi dance is a form of dance technique has been evolved from Bhaona which is a sophisticated type of dancing.

== Cuisine ==
The Kamrupi food homogenous to certain extent with nearby eastern states of West Bengal and Bihar. Mustard seeds and coconut is generously used in cooking, while ginger, garlic, pepper and onions are extensively used. Traditional utensils are made of bell metal though stainless steel is quite common in modern times.

== Notable people ==
- Haradatta Choudhury
- Birdatta Choudhury
- Ambikagiri Raichoudhury
- Bishnu Ram Medhi
- Indira Goswami
- Kaliram Medhi
- Mahendra Mohan Choudhry
- Rameshwar Pathak
- Parbati Charan Das
- Bakul Kayastha
- Himanta Biswa Sarma

== See also ==
- Kamrup (disambiguation)
- Kamrupi (disambiguation)
