= Nalbari =

Nalbari Nabadeep
- Town
- Nalbari Town
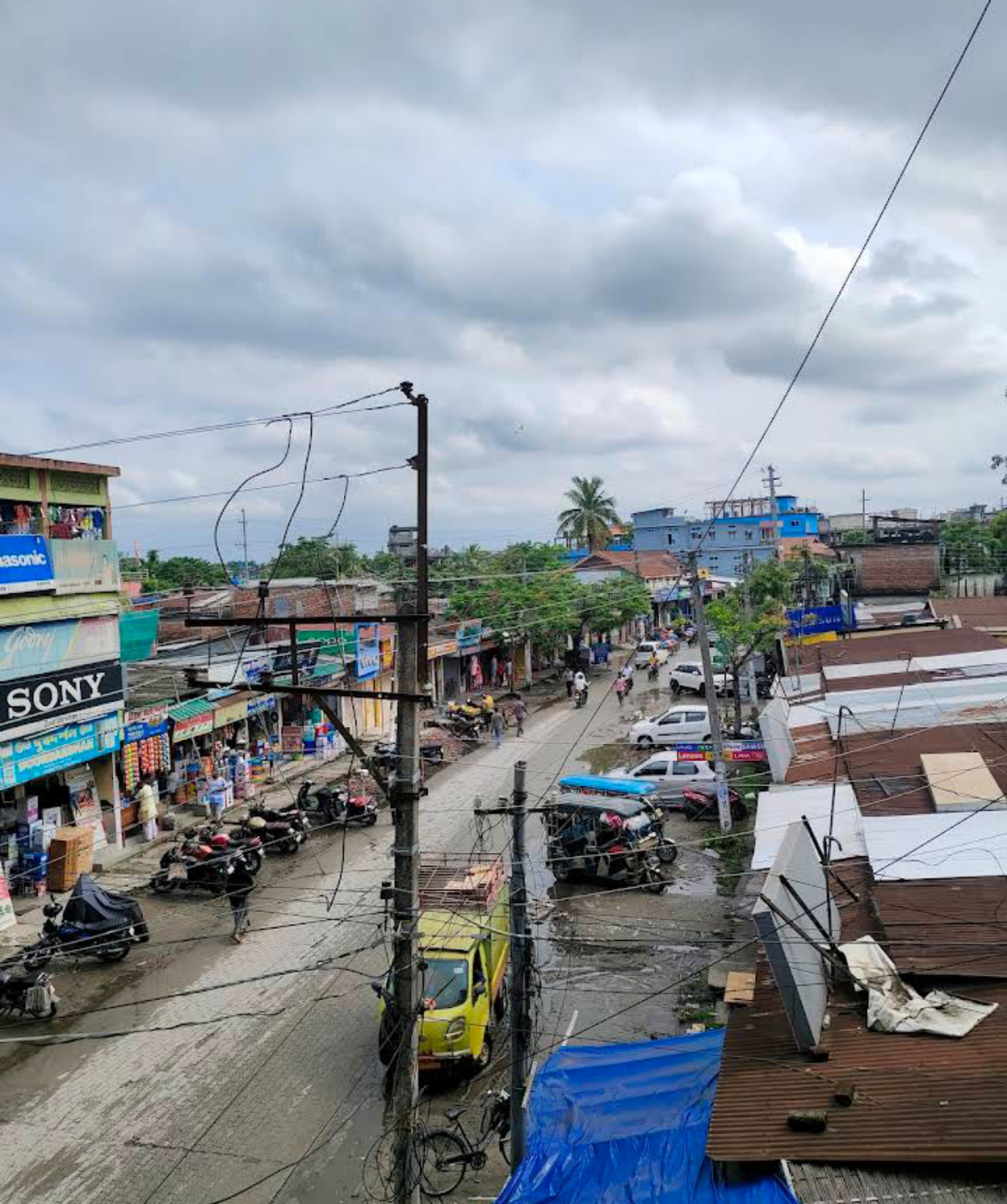
- Nalbari town

- Location in Assam, India Nalbari (India)
- Coordinates: 26.445°N 91.440°E
- Country: India
- State: Assam
- Region: Lower Assam
- District: Nalbari

Government
  - Body: Nalbari Municipality Board
  - Deputy Commissioner: Varnali Deka, IAS
- Elevation: 42 m (138 ft)

Population (2001)
  - Total: 27,389
- Demonym: Nalbeira

Languages
  - Official: Assamese
  - Native: Kamrupi dialect of Assamese
- Time zone: UTC+5:30 (IST)
- PIN: 781335, 781369
- Telephone code: 03624
- ISO 3166 code: IN-AS
- Vehicle registration: AS-14-XXXX
- Website: nalbari.assam.gov.in

Nalbari is a small town in Nalbari district in the Indian state of Assam. Nalbari is also the headquarters of Nalbari District.

== Etymology ==
The word Nalbari is derived from nal and bari. Nal is a variety of reed, while bari means 'enclosed ground with plantation'.

== History ==
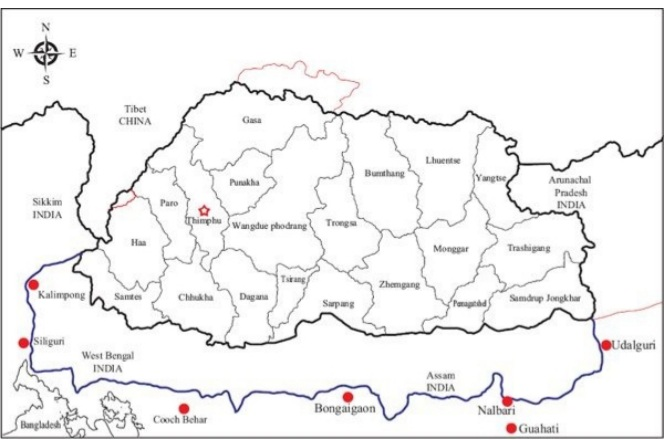
The Northern part of present-day Nalbari was under the Kingdom of Bhutan before the 1865 Duar War

Until the late 19th century, Nalbari acted as the southern boundary of the Kingdom of Bhutan when it was ceded to British India after the Duar War.

The history of Nalbari dates back to many centuries B.C. Arthashastra of Kautilya mentioned the import of various economic products from Nalbari. The Suvarnakundya village near Nalbari town produced the finest silk of Kautilya's time. The area also produced a special perfume among others. The Chandan and Aguru products were highly exported to faraway places including north India. Western Assam was known as Kamarupa from earlier times to the pre-modern period, which existed in harmony with Davaka of central Assam. Kamarupa was divided into Kamarupa Pithas or geographical divisions; Nalbari was placed in Kamapitha division.

== Language ==
The native speech of Nalbari is Nalbariya dialect, a dialect of the Kamrupi group of Assamese language.

== Archaeology ==
The Nalbari area is important archeologically; there have been various discoveries of copper plate inscriptions of Kamrupi kings from Nalbari. The village Guwakuchi near Nalbari town is one such archeological site where several ancient inscriptions were discovered.

== Economy ==
In the early part of the twenties a railway station of the Assam-Bengal Railway Company had been established here. As the train started running through the town, certain traders and businessmen from outside the state came and interacted with the local people. Business transactions were started on the rail station road. The Nalbari M.E. School had been started in the meantime to the Gurdon School site, and it was upgraded into a high school named Gurdon High School in 1917. These two events attracted the people to throng to the area which had changed in shape and size. It became a strong business centre with great growth potential along the whole of the north bank of the river.

Migration started in a significant way. The population increased, administrative offices were started gradually and in 1931, it assumed an urban look. In 1941, it was declared a town in the Kamrup district with a town committee and a population of 3578. In 1945, the Nalbari College was started in a temporary shed and in 1950, it was shifted to its present site which helped in the growth of the Bidyapur-Shantipur area of the town into a densely populated area. The establishment of the PWD offices on the Palla road led to the growth of the Gopalbazar area.

In 1968, Nalbari was upgraded into a subdivision with headquarters at Nalbari and in 1984, it was made the district headquarters of Nalbari District, all of which led to the upsurge of the development process with huge population migration, primarily of local people.

== Geography ==
=== Climate ===
Nalbari has a subtropical climate, with chilly winters, hot summers and wet monsoon.

Climate data for Nalbari
Month	Jan	Feb	Mar	Apr	May	Jun	Jul	Aug	Sep	Oct	Nov	Dec	Year
Record high °C (°F)	28.8 (83.8)	32.2 (90.0)	38.4 (101.1)	39.0 (102.2)	37.0 (98.6)	38.3 (100.9)	36.5 (97.7)	36.2 (97.2)	35.8 (96.4)	34.3 (93.7)	31.0 (87.8)	28.1 (82.6)	39.0 (102.2)
Mean daily maximum °C (°F)	23.6 (74.5)	26.2 (79.2)	30.0 (86.0)	31.2 (88.2)	31.2 (88.2)	31.7 (89.1)	31.9 (89.4)	32.2 (90.0)	31.7 (89.1)	30.3 (86.5)	27.6 (81.7)	24.7 (76.5)	29.4 (84.9)
Mean daily minimum °C (°F)	10.3 (50.5)	12.0 (53.6)	15.9 (60.6)	20.0 (68.0)	22.7 (72.9)	24.9 (76.8)	25.6 (78.1)	25.6 (78.1)	24.7 (76.5)	21.9 (71.4)	16.7 (62.1)	11.8 (53.2)	19.3 (66.8)
Record low °C (°F)	4.7 (40.5)	5.1 (41.2)	8.3 (46.9)	13.0 (55.4)	16.2 (61.2)	20.4 (68.7)	21.4 (70.5)	22.1 (71.8)	19.7 (67.5)	13.6 (56.5)	10.3 (50.5)	6.0 (42.8)	4.7 (40.5)
Average rainfall mm (inches)	11.9 (0.47)	18.3 (0.72)	55.8 (2.20)	147.9 (5.82)	244.2 (9.61)	316.4 (12.46)	345.4 (13.60)	264.3 (10.41)	185.9 (7.32)	91.2 (3.59)	18.7 (0.74)	7.1 (0.28)	1,717.7 (67.63)
Average rainy days	1.8	2.9	5.8	13.1	17.0	19.6	22.3	18.5	15.2	7.4	2.8	1.3	127.7
Average relative humidity (%)	79	65	57	68	75	81	83	82	83	82	82	82	77
Mean monthly sunshine hours	226.3	214.7	220.1	201.0	192.2	132.0	124.0	161.2	138.0	204.6	231.0	232.5	2,277.6
Source: World Meteorological Organization

Nalbari has been ranked 23rd best “National Clean Air City” under (Category 3 population under 3 lakhs cities) in India.

== Education ==
Educational opportunities in Nalbari are of high quality. It boasts of producing the highest number of exceptional students at the school level. Nalbari is famous for its Sanskrit education and is known as Nabadeep for the presence of various Sanskrit education institutions like Kamrup Sanskrit Sanjivani Sabha.

First School was set up in Nalbari in the year 1887, which later became known as Nalbari Govt Gurdon H.S School. Nalbari College, Nalbari; Nalbari Sanskrit College, Nalbari; Nalbari Commerce College, Nalbari; MNC Balika College, Nalbari; Barbhag College, Kamarkuchi; Baska College, Mashalpur; Barkhetri College, Mukalmua; Tihu College, Tihu; Barama College, Barama; Kamrup College, Chamata; Dhamdhama Anchalik College, Dhamdhama; Gyanpeeth Mahavidyalaya; Nalbari Law College, Nalbari; Sankardev Academy, Nalbari, D.S.R.Academy, Nalbari, Spectrum Gurukul, Nalbari are some premier colleges of Nalbari. Along with 28 higher secondary schools, 145 high schools, and 276 ME and MV schools, Nalbari has massive educational infrastructure.

Kumar Bhaskar Varma Sanskrit and Ancient Studies University named after the king of Kamarupa, Bhaskar Varman, and the Planetarium and the Science Centre at Sariahtali have been added to this existing system.

== Tourism ==
Hari Mandir, the major landmark of the town

- Planetarium and Science Centre: the Planetarium and Science Centre are located at Sariahtali. Its planetarium dome organises regular shows. The centre has various corners dedicated to different scientific phenomena.
- Kamrup Sanskrit Sanjivani Sabha: the Kamrup Sanskrit Sanjivani Sabha was formed in the 1930s to preserve ancient Sanskrit manuscripts. Its library contains thousands of rare Sanskrit manuscripts.
- Billeshwar Temple: the temple is dedicated to God Krishna and is over 500 years old. It is believed that a Shivalinga was unearthed here and hence it is notable that a temple to Lord Krishna is constructed at this site. Legends state that a priest who lived here owned a cow, which would only give milk by a patch of virina, a grass type. The king of the state was intrigued and ordered the place to be dug up to find a Shivalinga on the spot. Following the incident, a temple was constructed here but it was dedicated to Krishna. Ahom king and Lakshmi Singha rebuilt the temple, which faced the wrath of a natural disaster.
- Hari Mandir: the temple is a major landmark of the town. Its history is correlated with the Ras Mahotsav being organized in Nalbari district since the early twentieth century. The evolution of the Hari Mandir has been a saga of decades. The history of the Hari Mandir is connected to the Ras Puja of Nalbari. In the year 1931, under leading of then-engineer Amar Kundu of Nalbari Public Works Department (PWD) and Veterinary Assistant Naren Basu and local people including Gadamalla Barua, Dandiram Mahajan, Rabi Mahajan, Tanuram Das, Keertiram Thikadar, Padmapani Dutta and Bhairab Choudhury, a meeting was organized at Kundu's residence. The meeting was held regarding the organization of Ras Puja at Nalbari. Though they were unable to organize Ras Puja the same year, the next year they were able to organize the Puja in some available space at Kundu's official residence. In 1933, the Ras Puja Committee was formed to organize the puja. That year, with the help of public donations, the Ras Puja was organized publicly at the old Hatkhola in Nalbari. At that time the Ras Puja was initiated religiously and was an occasion of three days. After several years, the Ras Puja became popular and the organizers had to think about a new place for the puja, as the need for a larger space arose. The organizers and the local people searched for a permanent public plot to maintain the continuity of the puja. Finally the permanent public plot was found at the Dag No 584 of Nalbari town, with the grateful help of the then-Sub-Deputy Collector Krishna Ram Medhi. This is the current plot. The plot was on privately owned property, of which revenue was pending for many years. After negotiations with the plot owner and the Ras Puja committee, witnessed by the then-Mouzadar Pratap Narayan Choudhury, the ownership of the plot was transferred to the Hari Mandir. In 1939, the foundation of the Mandir (currently the old mandir) was built with the four wooden posts of Shal donated by Priyanath Kabiraz of Alengidal. In 1946 the Ras Puja was moved from the old Hathkhola to the plot of the Hari Mandir. Damahuram Mahajan played the prime role in the construction of the old Hari Mandir, which was completed in 1965. With help of his donation, the Puja Mandap was constructed in 1968. Over time, the popularity of the Ras Puja increased year by year, as did the growth of the Mandir. The Ras Puja festival soon turned from Utsava to Mahotsava with the continuation of public interest, cooperation and donations. Initially, the Ras Mahotsava was a three-day event, but in the 1960s it became a five-day event, and then a seven-day event in the 1970s. Today the Ras Mahotsava is a festival of 11 to 15 days.
- Shripur Devalaya: the temple is believed to have been constructed by Sib Singha, an Ahom king. It is believed that a part of Goddess Parvati, when she was born on earth as Sati, fell here. Hence, the temple is dedicated to Goddess Parvati. The people celebrate Kali Puja and Durga Puja in this temple.
- Basudev Devalaya: it is from the period between 1718 and 1744 AD. It was constructed by Sib Singha, an Ahom king. King Sib Singha's brother Sib Singha made his contribution by donating 64 bighas of land to Basudeb Devalay. The legend centering on the construction of this temple states that a fisherman of this region was unable to remove his fishing net from a pond for seven days. On the seventh day, it is said that Lord Basudeb appeared in the dream of a local person and asked to be released from the net. Following this, the person went over to the pond to find two large stones. Since efforts to remove the stones by King Sib Singha failed, a temple was built by him at the site.
- Buddhist temple: the Buddhist temple is located 30 km away from Nalbari town. The temple was constructed by Nepali people in 1965 and was initiated by Chhatra Singh. A new Gumba was constructed in 1971 by Chhatra Singh. The new Gumba earns a place among the biggest Gumba in Nalbari district. Devotees visit the place for the annual Buddha Jayanti celebration.
- Kumar Bhaskar Varman Sanskrit and Ancient Studies University: the university is one-of-a-kind in the entire region. The vision of the university is to popularise studies in the ancient history of Kamrup, which dates back to many centuries B.C. The university provides degrees in Sanskrit language. Its library contains numerous works on the ancient history of Kamrup and Sanskrit language.

== Transport ==
By road, Nalbari is accessible through National Highway 27 in the north and connected to National Highway 427 in the south. The Nalbari railway station is within the town center, and Guwahati International Airport is at a distance of 60 km.

== Politics ==
Nalbari is part of Mangaldoi (Lok Sabha constituency).

== Notable people ==
- Abani Chakraborty, poet
- Adya Sharma, mobile theater pioneer
- Alaka Sarma, former 2 time MLA, wife of Nagen Sarma
- Angoorlata Deka, actress and politician
- Bhumidhar Barman, politician, former Chief Minister of Assam
- Chandra Mohan Patowary, politician
- Dipak Sarma, flutist
- Mahadev Deka, body builder
- Mithinga Daimary, poet and former Publicity secretary of United Liberation Front of Asom (ULFA)
- Nagen Sarma, former PWD Minister
- Heerak Jyoti Mahanta, late deputy Commander-in-Chief of United Liberation Front of Asom (ULFA)
- Himanta Biswa Sarma, 15th Chief Minister of Assam
- Madan Kalita, former politician
- Nilamani Sen Deka, politician, former Cabinet Minister
- Rajen Sharma, poet and first Publicity secretary of ULFA
- Raju Baruah, Operation commander of ULFA
- Seema Biswas, Bollywood actress
- Tapan Baruah, first Commander of 28 Battatlion of ULFA
- Trailokyanath Goswami, litterateur

== See also ==
- Guwahati
- Bongaigaon
- Barpeta
- Rangiya
