= Kamarupa Anusandhan Samiti =

Research institution in North-East India

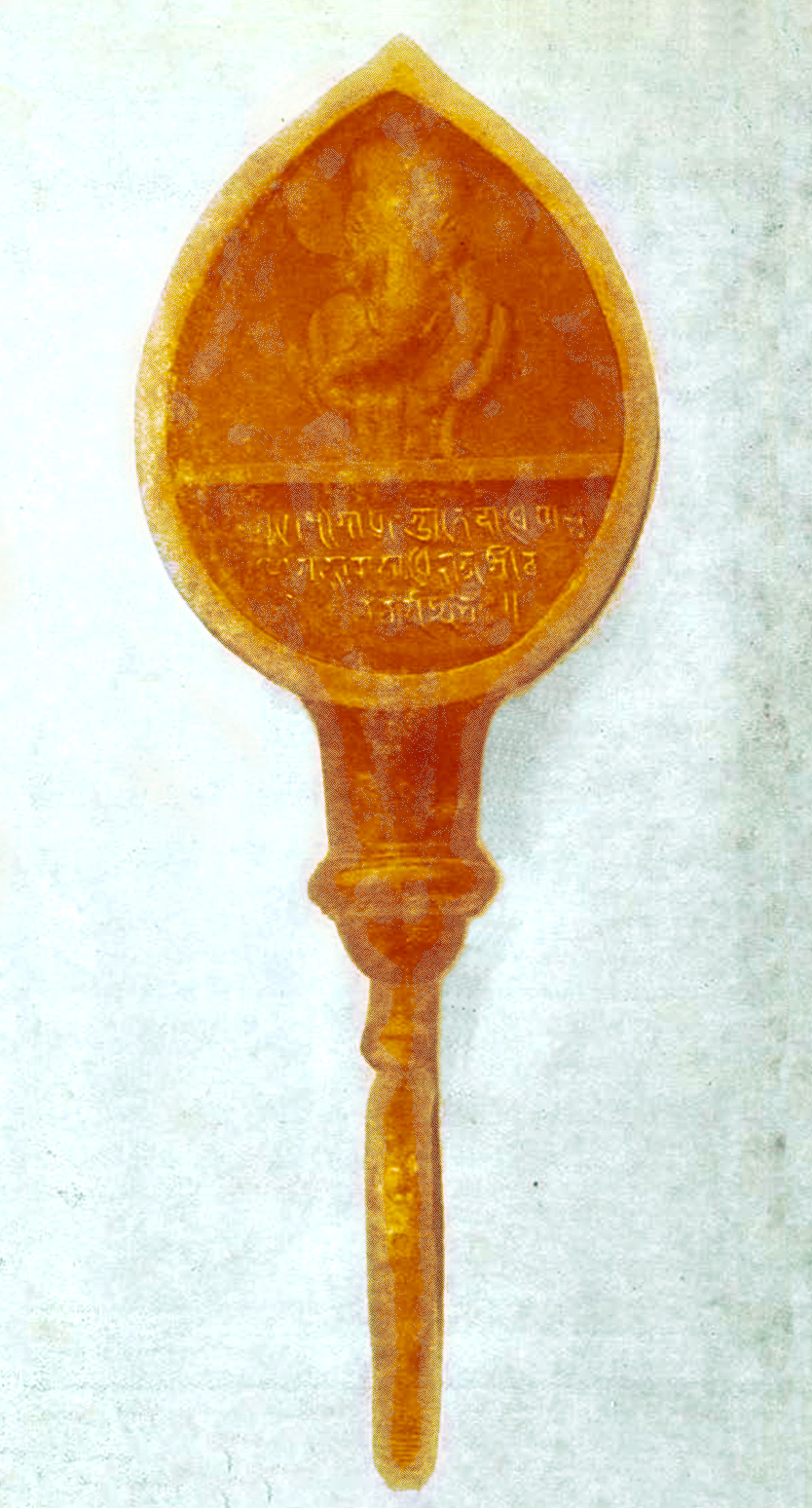
Copper Plate Seal of Kamarupa Kings unearthed by Kamarupa Anusandhan Samiti

The Kamarupa Anusandhana Samiti (Assam Research Society) is the oldest Research institution in North-East India, which was established in the year 1912 at Kamakhya with a view to working in the field of antiquarian study and research, particularly on the subject of History, Archaeology, Anthropology, Culture etc. It was this society that started the Museum movement for the collection and preservation of antiquities culminating in the birth of the Assam State Museum in 1940.

== Establishment ==
The historian Padmanath Bhattacharya Vidya Vinod mooted the idea of establishing an antiquarian society comprising the geographical territory of erstwhile Pragjyotisha-Kamarupa. This ancient kingdom included parts of present-day West Bengal and Bangladesh, besides Assam.

The concept attracted a group of enthusiasts trying to preserve materials related to art, history, literature and culture of the province. The idea crystallized at the Kamakhya conference of the Uttar Bangiya Sahitya Parishad in April, 1912. It was resolved to set up an organization to preserve and promote research on matters related to archaeology, ethnography, language, literature, history, and culture of the region that formed the ancient kingdom of Pragjyotisha-Kamarupa. The Kamarupa Anusandhana Samiti, which was also to be known by a secondary title, the Assam Research Society, was then formed. A number of prominent personalities were associated with the samiti: Kanak Lal Barua, was the Founder President, Chandra Nath Sarma was the founder secretary, and patrons included Maharaja Jitendranarayan Bhup Bahadur of Cooch Behar, lieutenant-governor of Orissa and Bihar Edward Albert Gait, Commissioner of Assam Valley Lt Col P.R.T. Gordon, chief commissioner of Assam Sir Archdale Earle, Raja Prabhat Chandra Barooah Bahadur of Gauripur, and many other scholars.

== Early works ==
The samiti started its work with a missionary zeal and began to collect inscriptions, puthis, ethnographical objects, relics, and manuscripts from the Pragjyotisha-Kamarupa region. The preservation of these collections necessitated the construction of a building. When all early efforts to persuade the government to immediately establish a museum to store these objects failed, the samiti decided to construct its own building. The estimated cost of construction, ₹ 20,000, was raised with contributions from various donors, the principal contributor being Raibahadur Naupat Rai Kedia of Dibrugarh. When Lt Col P.R.T. Gordon, then the commissioner of the Assam Valley and honorary provincial director of Ethnography, Assam formally inaugurated the samiti’s building on November 19, 1917. The samiti’s activities attracted the attention of Indologists throughout eastern India. A branch of the Kamarupa Anusandhana Samiti was established at Rangpur (now in Bangladesh) with Babu Surendra Chandra Roychoudhury as its secretary. The Asiatic Society of Calcutta organized exhibitions of the samiti’s collections and kept a close link with it until 1950. Assam did not have any museum until 1940, but the purpose of a museum was being served by Kamarupa Anusandhana Samiti.

Kamarupa Anusandhan Samiti retains its exclusive identity and continues its activities from the same old Assam-type building which is situated on the western bank of Dighlipukhri in the centre of Guwahati.

== See also ==
- Prachin Kamrupi Nritya Sangha
- Kamrup
- Kamrupi
