= Trailokyanath Goswami =

Indian Assamese author (1906–1988)

- Born: 1906; Nalbari, Assam, India
- Died: 1 December 1988 (aged 82)
- Occupations: Novelist, short story writer
- Writing career
- Notable work: Adhunik Asamiya Galpa Sangraha

Trailokyanath Goswami (1906–1988) was noted writer from Nalbari, Assam, India. He wrote various novels and short stories in Assamese language. He is known for realistic variety in his works. Having understanding of both eastern and eastern aesthetics, has sound judgement and wide sympathy. He made critical analysis of trends in modern literature.

== Early life and career ==
He was born in 1906 in Nalbari district. He started his career as school teacher in Gordon High School in Nalbari. He served A.K Institute in North Guwahati as head master. He worked as assistant lecturer in English in Cotton College in Guwahati and Murarichand College in Sylhet. In 1945, he resigned from government post and joined founder principal of Nalbari College in Nalbari. He edited and published magazine named Mandakini in 1967. He was president of Asam Sahitya Sabha for sessions held in Palasbari (1960) and Goalpara (1961). He addressed Prajatantra Prachar Samiti, Odisha in 1967 as guest-in-chief. He was well versed in Sanskrit, Hindi, Assamese, Bengali and English languages.

== Works ==
He was story-teller with some novels in his name. He published various collections of short stories, which has realistic portrayal of various facets of society and criticism of the dwindling morals and values of the same. His works are distinguished by poise and balance, which has faith in ultimate regeneration of society. His notable works are Aruna (1948), Marichika (1948), Shilpir Janma (1957) and Jivanar Jiya Jui (1970), Jiya Manuh (satirical novel), Sahitya Alochana (1950), Adhunik Galpa Sahitya (1961), Samudra Manthana (1968), Ingraji Samalochanar Dhara aru Asamiya Sahitayar Prabhav (1970), Sahitya Kala aru tar Vichar (1972), Sahitya Samiksha and Nandanattava:Pracharya aru Pashchatya (1980).

== Recognition ==
In 1967 he was awarded Sahitya Akademi Award for his Adhunik Galpa Sahitya and Assam Publication Board Award was conferred to him in 1984 for Nandanattava:Pracharya aru Pashchatya.

== See also ==
- Kanak Lal Barua, writer, essayist, historian and politician
