= Darbar House stone inscription =

Rock inscription

Darbar Mandir Inscription
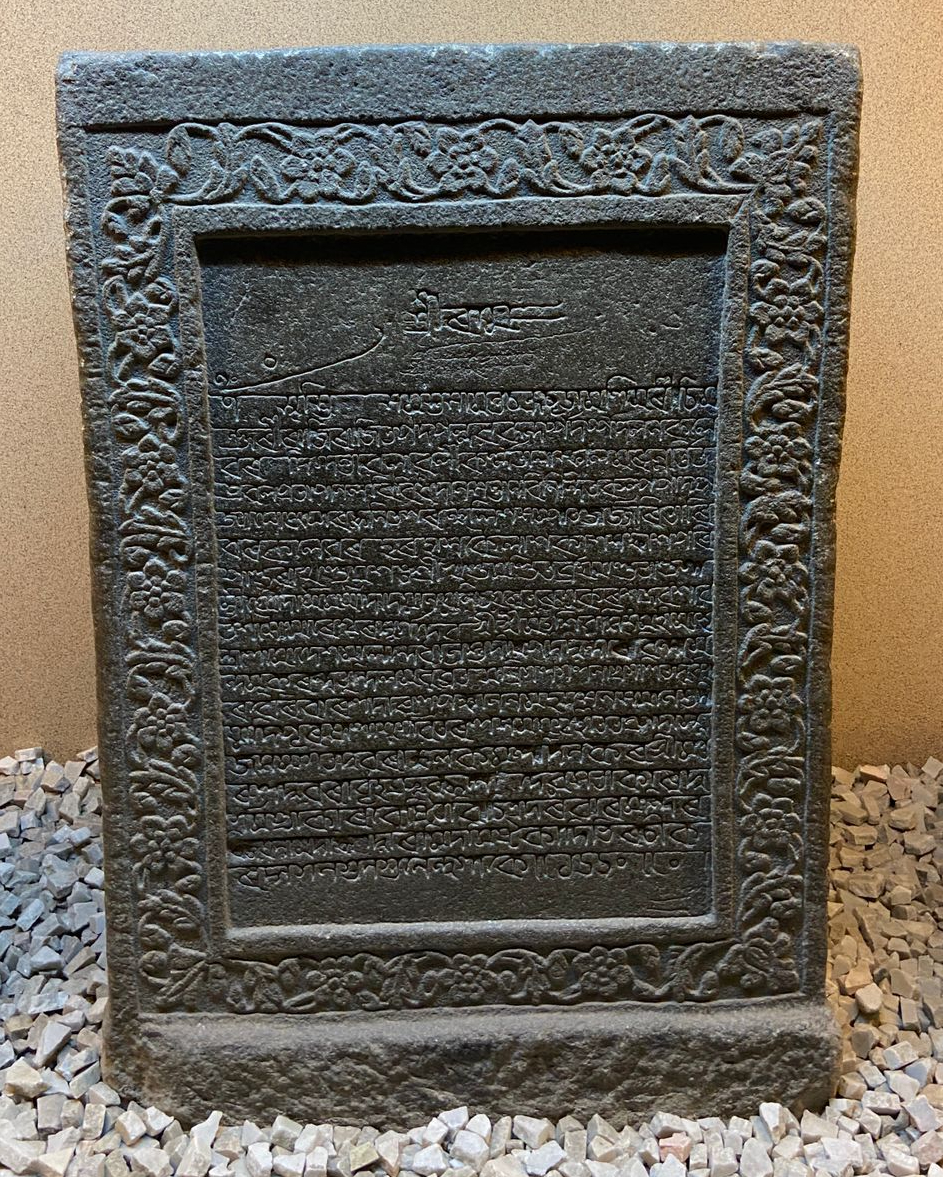
- Rock inscription at the Northern Jaya-Duar of Borphukan's Mantra Bhavana (Darbar-Bhavana) at Guwahati saka 1660 (1738 AD)
- Builder: Built under the supervision of Tarun Duara Borphukan
- Completion date: 1738; 288 years ago

This stone inscription inscribed in Saka 1660 (1738 AD), records the construction of the Southern Gateway of the Barphukan's Office (Durbar) at the supervision of Tarun Duara Borphukan under the command of Siva Singha.

The inscription was originally on the southern gate of the Barphukan's Office, from where now it is currently preserved at Assam State Museum.
