= Victory inscription pillar of Namjani Borphukan =

Stone pillar inscription

Victory pillar of Namjani Borphukan
- Barphukanar Jayasthamba
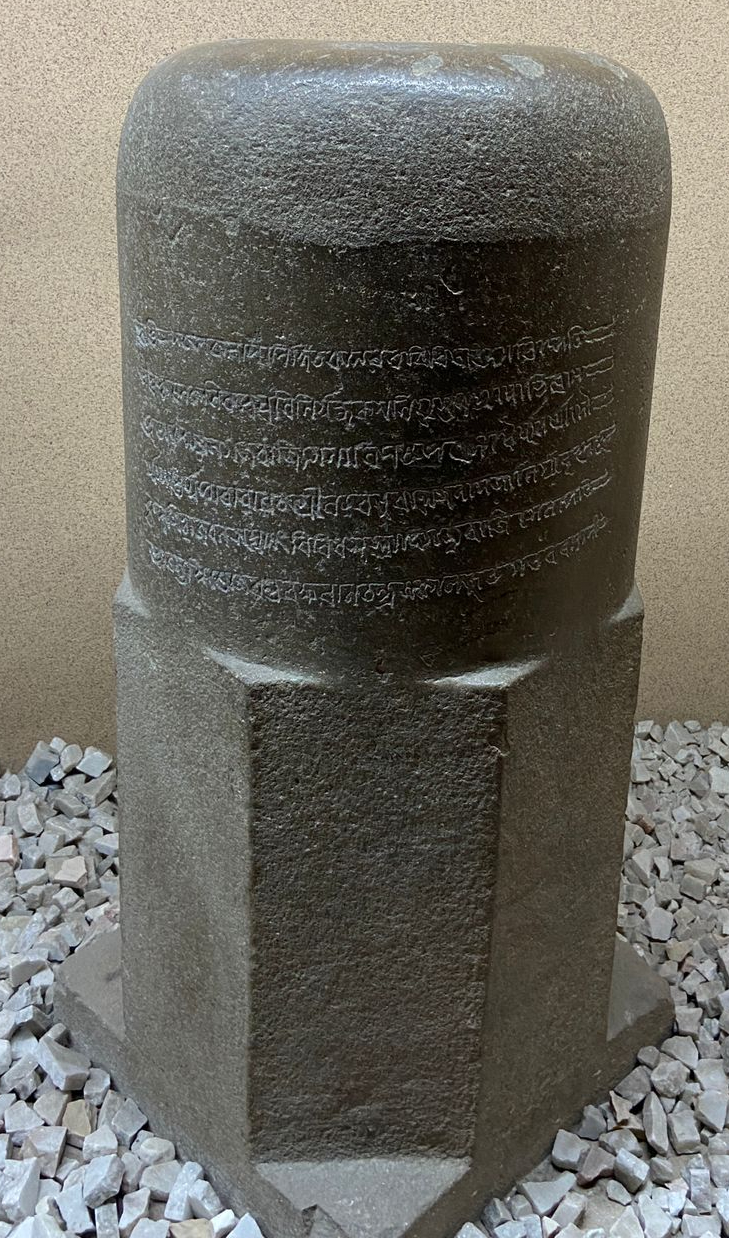
- Writing: Language; Sanskrit, Script; Assamese
- Created: 1667; 359 years ago
- Discovered: Fathasil, South Guwahati

Victory inscription pillar of Namjani Borphukan or Barphukanar Jayasthamba is a stone pillar inscribed with a record of the defeat of the Mughals in the Conquest of Guwahati by the Ahoms in 1667 A.D. This inscription extols the qualities of Namjani Barphukan or Lachit Barphukan, son of Borbarua. It was inscribed in randhra-vajra-vana chandra, saka 1589 after the victory over the Yavanas (The Muslims).

The rock inscription was discovered in Fatasil, in the south Guwahati. The pillar measures 41 inches (100 cm) in height and 53.5 inches (136 cm) in girth, and is now preserved in Assam State Museum.
