= Char Chapori =

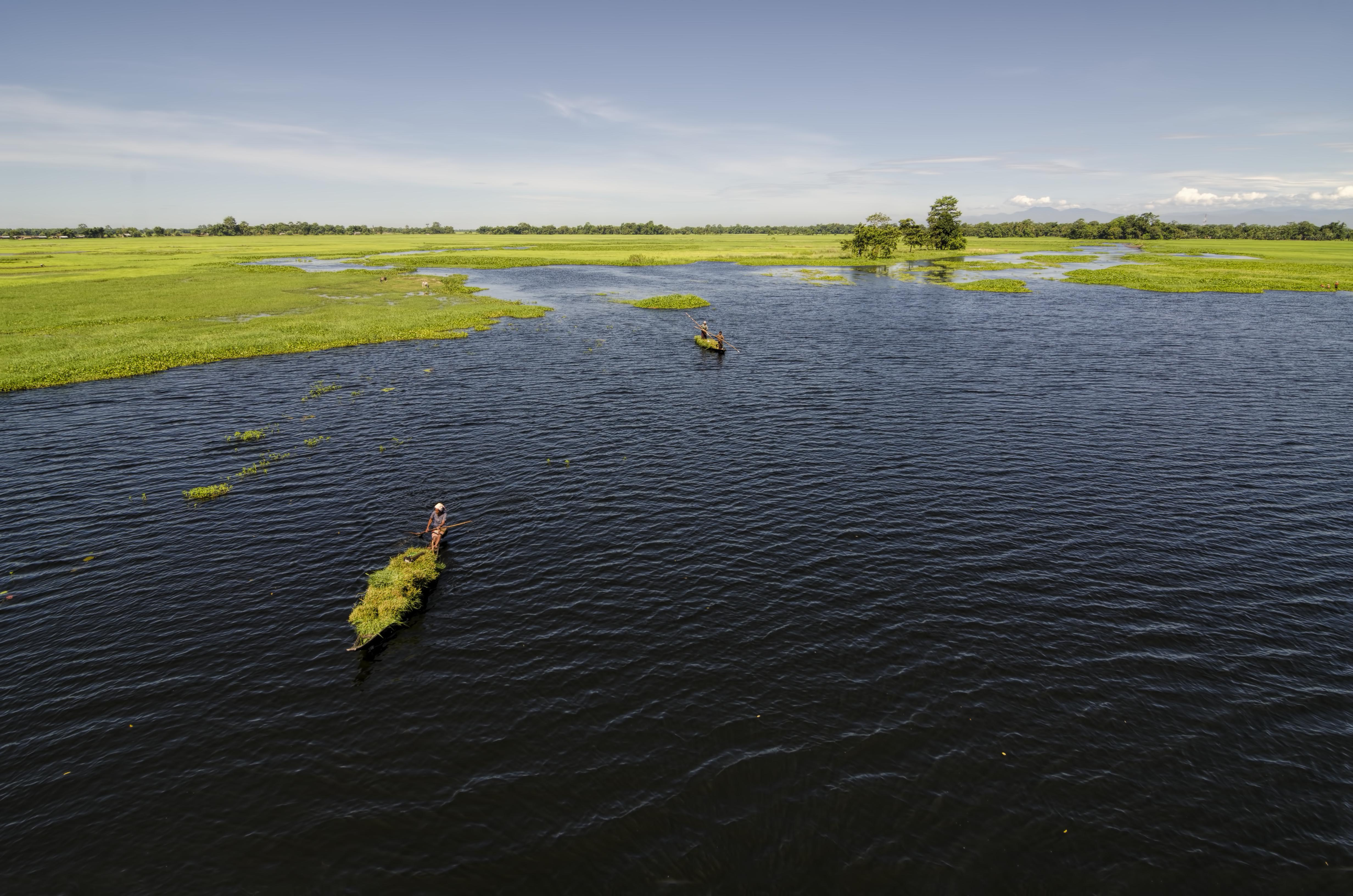
- Doriya River of Majuli

- Location within Assam

Geography
- Location: Brahmaputra River and its tributaries
- Coordinates: 26°57′0″N 94°10′0″E

Administration
- India
- State: Assam

Demographics
- Ethnic groups: Miya people, Mishing, Deori, Sonowal Kacharis, Koch, Ahom, Chutia, Kalita, Brahmin, Keot, Sut, Nath(yogi) groups

Additional information
- Time zone: IST (UTC+5:30)
- PIN: 785102, 785104, 785105, 785110, 785106.781001, 788334 etc

Char Chapori (Assamese: চৰ চাপৰি) is an area in Brahmaputra river and its tributaries in the Indian state Assam constitution of floodplain sediments. According to the Assam Government record, the Char Chapori covers 3,608 km^{2} of the Brahmaputra basin, or 4.6% of Assam's area.

== Livelihood and Environment ==
Communities in the Char Chaporis have developed livelihood and farming practices closely linked to the seasonal rhythms of the Brahmaputra. Agriculture, grazing, and small-scale settlements are sustained by the fertile but shifting terrain. These practices rely on generational knowledge and adaptation to an uncertain environment. However, increasing climate variability poses significant risks to these adaptive systems, making long-term sustainability a growing concern.

== Problems ==
The people of Char Chapori face a certain number of problems including soil erosion, over flooding, illiteracy, high population growth and organised hate crime against them.

== Population ==
Char Chapori bears maximum numbers of Minority Muslim .According to Government of Assam the population of approx. 24.90 lakhs.
