= Cultural development of Kamarupa =

Kamarupa was a kingdom in Northeast India that was ruled by three dynasties (Varmans, Mlechchha, and Palas) from their capitals in Pragjyotishpura, Haruppeshwara, and Durjaya. The kingdom was known for its power and influence in the region.

== Early development ==
Xuanzang's historical account from the seventh century mentions that the people of Kamarupa practised deva worship and did not adhere to Buddhism. However, there were a few Buddhists who conducted their devotional rituals in secret due to fears of persecution. Shilabhadra, a prominent figure, showed respect to accomplished shramanas (Buddhist monks).

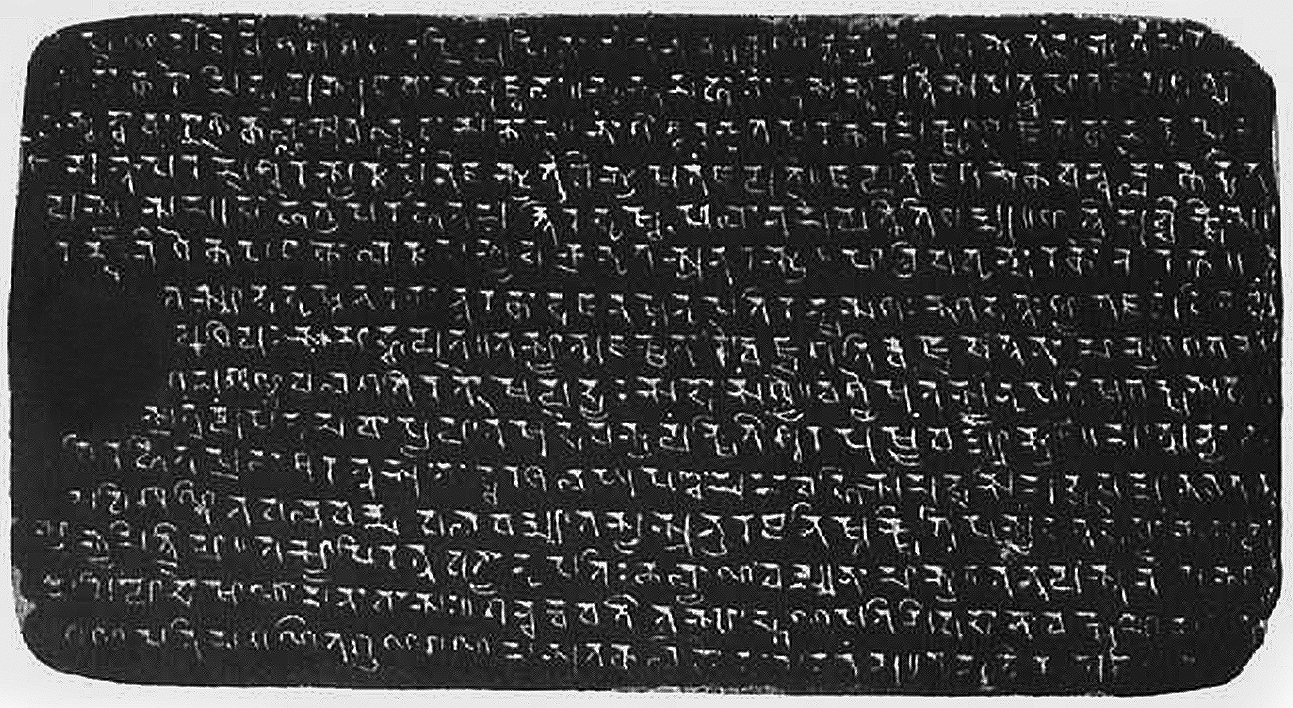
Bhaskaravarman Nidhanpur inscription

While Brahmanic rituals were widely followed by the general population, Buddhism also thrived in Kamarupa. The "Sankara Digvijaya" mentions a philosophical debate between Sankaracharya, a prominent Brahmanic leader of the ninth century, and Abhinava Gupta, a renowned Buddhist scholar, in Kamarupa. Similarly, Kumarila Bhatta, another influential Brahmanic leader, lived in India during the same period, possibly originating from Kamarupa.

According to Giuseppe Tucci, based on Tibetan sources such as "Grub To'b" and "Bka ababs bdun ldan," the Buddhist Siddha Minanatha, revered in Tibet as an incarnation of Avalokiteśvara, was believed to have been a fisherman from Kamarupa. The claim by Mahamohopadhya Pandit Haraprasad Sastri that Minanatha hailed from Bengal and belonged to the weaver caste seems to be incorrect. Minanatha is credited with writing the Akulaviratantra and is mentioned as one of the twenty-four Kapalika Siddhas in the Sabaratantra.

It has been suggested that Visakha Datta, the renowned playwright of the Mudrarakshasam drama, who thrived in the latter part of the seventh century, may have come from the region of Kamarupa, located between the Teesta and the Kausika rivers. Additionally, there is mention of a Kamrupi pandit named Vishnusomacharya, to whom Anantavarman granted lands.

== Standard of architecture ==
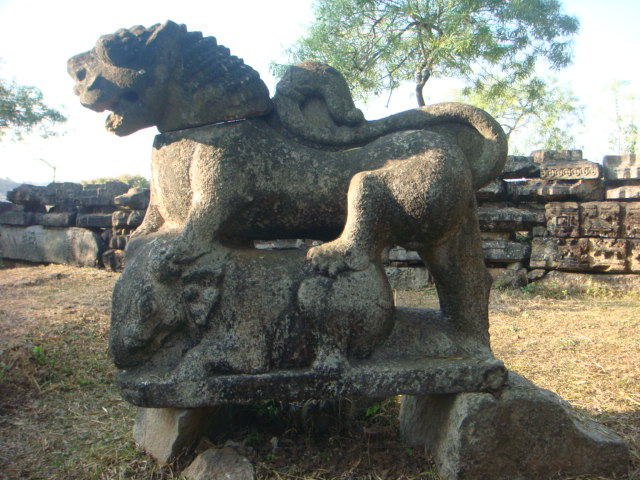
Madan Kamdev

The shrine of Pandu in Kamarupa contains five rock-cut figures. Among them, four depict Ganesha, and one represents a female deity, likely Durga. Additional carvings on the western slope of Kamakhya hill, facing the Brahmaputra River, include representations of the sun god and Indra, as identified by Mr. Dikshit.

According to Mr. R. D. Banerji, these carvings can be attributed to the seventh or eighth century AD. The ruins in and around Tezpur are more extensive and diverse in nature. Dr. Bloch suggested that the modern civil stations of Guwahati and Tezpur may have been built upon large mounds containing remnants of ancient cities. During construction work in 1906, the remains of an ancient stone building were uncovered in Tezpur's Deputy Commissioner's office. Numerous carved and sculptured stones were discovered, with most of them being relocated to the compounds of European officers and the tea planters club for decorative purposes. Some of these artefacts were later transferred and displayed at Cole Park.

Within the public park in Tezpur, there are two specimens that appear to belong to a different temple from a later period. One is a tall doorjamb, while the second is a slab featuring three sunken panels with crude human or divine figures. Among the collection, there is only one specimen carved in the round, depicting a lion, possibly riding an elephant. The representation of the lion indicates that the residents of the Assam valley had limited familiarity with the king of beasts. As mentioned by Mr. Banerji, Assam is the only province in India where the history of architecture and sculpture remains largely unknown.

For this reason, a substantial quotation from a reliable source is included to shed light on the subject. However, there is uncertainty as to whether Mr. Banerji's conjecture that the ruins in Tezpur only represent temples is accurate. The remains of the stone building discovered in the Kutchery compound may actually belong to the palace of Vanamala, believed to have been constructed in the ninth century. It is also unlikely that any of the buildings mentioned by Mr. Banerji were erected in the twelfth century, as it is probable that the capital Haruppeswara was abandoned by Brahma Pala toward the end of the tenth century. Therefore, the buildings in Tezpur likely date back to the ninth century. Furthermore, the grand temple described by Mr. Banerji, which he speculates was a sun temple, could be similar to the Himalayan-like temple of Hataka Sulin recreated by Vanamala. In his report for the year 1925–26, Mr. Banerji provides a detailed description of the Bamuni Hill ruins, situated east of Tezpur town.

Relics of ancient architecture and sculpture are not limited to Guwahati and Tezpur but can be found in various other locations. Along the Golaghat-Dimapur road, two images were discovered, one of which is a Vishnu image now preserved in the museum of the Kamaruppa Anusandhan Samiti. Regarding this image, Mr. K. N. Dikshit notes that it is a fine example of ninth-century Assamese art, inscribed with characters similar to those of the Harjara inscription from Tezpur. The image portrays Vishnu holding a conch in the left upper hand and a gada (mace) in the left lower hand. Vishnu is adorned with customary ornaments, including the kaustubha and srivatsa symbols, a sacred thread, and a long garland (vanamala) reaching the knees. The facial expression, treatment of the lower lip, and crown style are characteristic of late Gupta sculpture. The image features the Dhyana mudra and is surrounded by ararana devatas such as Durga, Ganesa, Kartikeya, and the winged Garuda. Mr. K. N. Dikshit suggests that the presence of Ganesa and Mahishamardini on the right indicates the intention to depict Vishnu at the centre of the five gods (Panchadevata). The deities on the left, however, deviate from expectations, with the upper figure appearing as Hanuman or an attendant of Vishnu and the lower one resembling a seated cross-legged ascetic, likely representing the donor as a devotee.

At the entrance of the sub-divisional officer's residence in Sibsagar, there is a collection of stone images and architectural fragments believed to be remnants of a Vishnu temple dating from the tenth to eleventh centuries AD. Mr. Dikshit suggests that these sculptures largely follow the artistic traditions of the Tezpur and Bamuni Hill temples of central Assam, attributed to the ninth and tenth centuries.

The ancient temple near Sibsagar was likely constructed by the Kamarupa kings during the tenth or eleventh century, indicating their rule extended to the easternmost corner of the Assam valley until at least the eleventh century. Mr. Dikshit also observes that Assamese art shows closer affinities with the schools of Bihar and Orissa than the contemporary Pala art of Bengal, which is understandable considering the influential cultural connections between Mithila and Kamarupa.

Another example of the architectural and engineering prowess of the ancient people of Kamarupa is the construction of stone bridges over rivers. In the western part of North Guwahati, there is a small stone bridge known as Silsako. The other Silsako bridge, located over a channel of the Barnadi River, was a significant transit point from the west but was destroyed in the great earthquake of 1897. The bridges were constructed without the use of lime and mortar, likely due to the heavy rainfall and abundant vegetation that would have deteriorated mortar-based structures. Hannay, who observed and measured the bridge in 1851, provided a description.

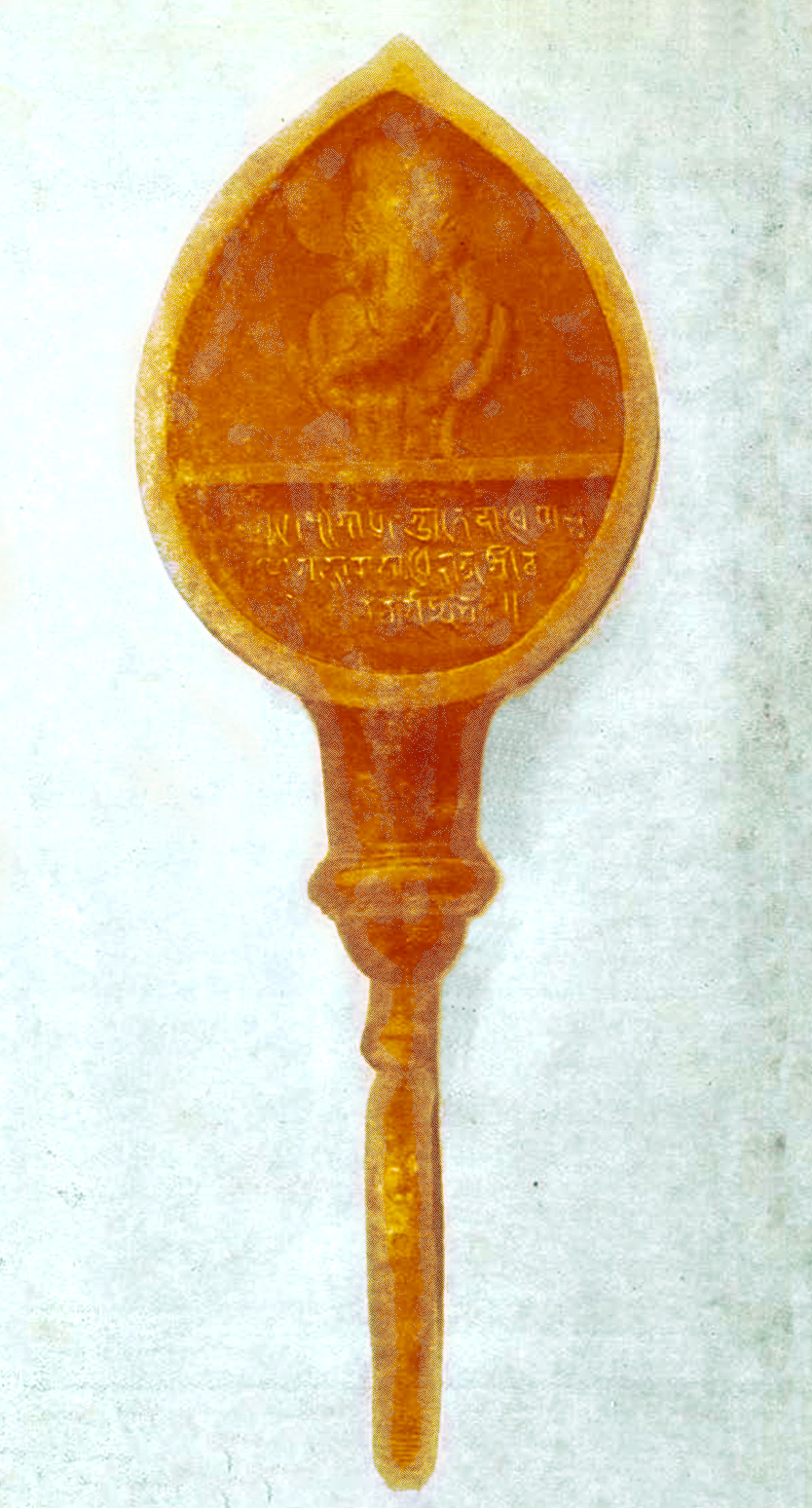
Copper Plate Seal of Kamarupa Kings

== See also ==
- Kamrup
- Kamrupi
