= Rameshwar Pathak =

- Born: 1 March 1938; Bhella, Undivided Kamrup district (now Barpeta district), Assam, India
- Died: 3 December 2010 (aged 72) Guwahati, Assam, India
- Genres: Kamrupi Lokgeet
- Occupations: Teacher; Singer
- Instrument: Vocals
- Years active: 1965-2010

Rameshwar Pathak (1 March 1938 – 3 December 2010) was an acclaimed Kamrupi Lokgeet singer from Kamrup, Assam, India. He was also known as Lokgeet Samrat in Assam. He also worked as a teacher in Arya Vidyapeeth Higher Secondary and Multipurpose School, Guwahati from 1963 to 1996.

== Early life ==
Born at Nagaon village of Bhella in Barpeta district, Pathak passed the matric examination in the year 1958, and went to the M.C. College, Barpeta and began concentrating on music while he continued his studies. During this time, he attended numerous baithakis (traditional singing and celebration sessions before a marriage ceremony). He learnt borgeets from the maestro Dayal Chandra Sutradhar.

In 1961, the inter-college youth festival was held at Guwahati and it was for the first time that M.C. College was participating in the festival. On that very occasion, Pathak topped in the borgeet, adhunik geet, bhajan and ghazal categories which inspired him tremendously. Immediately, after appearing in the BA final examination he got a call from the Assam Police to join as an Inspector. His friend Lohit Choudhury tore the call letter, saying that he didn't want Pathak to become a police man.

== Music career ==
In December 1963, Pathak joined the city's Arya Vidyapeeth Higher Secondary School as a subject teacher. He became popular among his students as well as his colleagues as a great singer. His colleague Afjal Hussain pressed him to give an audition for the All India Radio, Guwahati. During the audition, Pathak sang a modern Assamese song. Kamal Narayan Choudhury, the judge, scolded him and remarked that he was sacrificing a bright career by opting for modern songs. He inspired Pathak to concentrate on folk music. Pathak passed the audition, and became a familiar name for the listeners of radio in a short time. Subsequently, invitations began coming to him to perform in every nook and corner of the state.

In 1973, he first met his future wife Dhanada Barman, now Dhanada Pathak. Dhanada was a third-year graduate student, when her elder brother Hem Chandra Barman pressurised her to give an audition for radio. Hem Chandra took her to Rameshwar Pathak, whom she had heard many a times before. Pathak guided her for the audition. She was selected, and a year later, the two married. Dhananda came from a family of Barpeta, which owned a Jatra party in their home called "The Rowly Opera". Her elder brothers were actively associated with the opera in many ways. They acted, sang, played instruments like the dotora, flute and others and initiated the functioning of the opera. After their marriage, the couple collaborated on a number of gramophone records and over a hundred and fifty audio cassettes. They presented Assamese lokageet (folk songs) in duet and chorus style for the very first time, and became known as the doyens of Assamese folk music.

Pathak has performed all across Assam, and also in Delhi, Bangalore, Mumbai, Orissa, Himachal, Calcutta and North-East India.

== Death ==
During his last days, Pathak was a heart patient and went through a bypass surgery. In 1997, he met with an accident, in front of the city's Rabindra Bhawan in which his upper jaw was broken. And when he went outside the state for treatment it was discovered that he immediately needed a bypass operation. The Chief Minister of Assam donated ₹ 80,000 towards his treatment, which cost ₹ 300,000.

Pathak suffered a massive heart attack at his home on 3 December 2010 and died on the way to hospital. He was 72. He is survived by his wife and children.

== Awards and recognition ==
Awarded with the Sangeet Natak Akademi Award in the year 1990, Rameshwar Pathak was selected for the Artist's pension of the state government the same year.

== See also ==
- Pratima Barua Pandey
- Goalpariya Lokgeet
- Kamrupi dialect
