= Kamrup Sanskrit Sanjivani Sabha =

Indian research institute

- Established: 1913
- Mission: Preservation of Sanskrit manuscripts
- Location: Nalbari, Assam, India

Kamrup Sanskrit Sanjivani Sabha is a research and preservation institution formed in 1913. It deals primarily in Sanskrit language topics. It is located in Nalbari in India, and throughout involved in preservation of rare Sanskrit manuscripts. The manuscript library of this institute contains more than thousand Sanskrit manuscripts.

== See also ==
Kamarupa Anusandhan Samiti
