= Nayanjyoti Sarma =

Indian writer

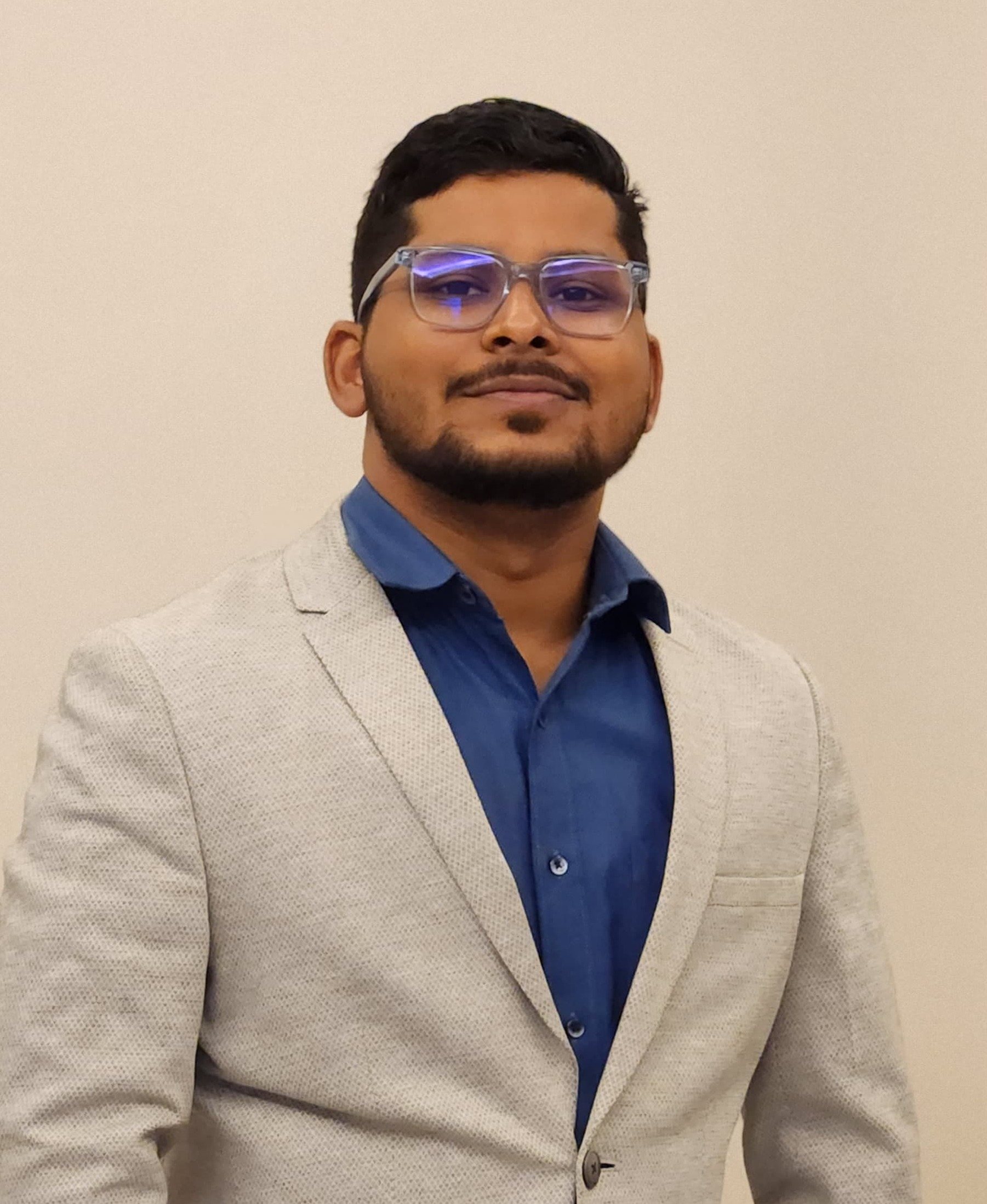
- Born: 3 June 1993 (age 33); Kamarkuchi, Nalbari district
- Education: Government Ayurvedic College, Guwahati
- Occupation: Writer
- Spouse: Mridushmita Bharadwaj
- Writing career
- Language: Assamese
- Notable works: Jaal Kota Jui, 2022
- Notable awards: Munin Borkotoky Literary Award, 2023; Sahitya Akademi Yuva Puraskar, 2024

Nayanjyoti Sarma (born 3 June 1993) is an Assamese short story writer, author, Wikimedian and physician. He is currently working at Sushrusa Hospital in Nalbari. Sarma received the Munin Borkotoky Literary Award in November 2023 for his collection of short stories, Jaal Kota Jui. For same book he received Sahitya Akademi Yuva Puraskar for Assamese in 2024. Additionally, he was awarded the Pragjyotishpur Literature Award-2023 at the Pragjyotishpur Literature Festival, held from 29 September to 1 October in 2023.

== Early life and education ==
Dr. Sarma was born on 3 June 1993, in Kamarkuchi village, Nalbari district. His father is Khanindra Sharma, and his mother is Usha Devi. In 2010, he passed his High School Leaving Certificate Examination from Assam Academy, Nalbari. He completed his Higher Secondary education from Nalbari College in 2012. In 2017, he graduated with a BAMS degree from Government Ayurvedic College, Guwahati, and in 2021, he earned an MS in Shalya Tantra from the same college under Srimanta Sankaradeva University of Health Sciences.

== Literary works ==
- Jaal Kota Jui (2022, Purvayan Publications)
- Black Beauty (Translation, 2023, Assam Publications Board)
