= Adya Sharma =

Indian mobile theater producer

- Born: November 5, 1929; Makhibaha, Nalbari district, Assam
- Died: February 22, 2015 (aged 85); Nalbari, Assam
- Known for: Titanic in Kohinoor Theatre

Adya Sharma was a producer of mobile theatre from Nalbari district of Assam.

Sharma was born in Makhibaha, Nalbari district. He was known as Guruji and Kaka (brother). His first production was at the Purbajyoti Theatre in 1966. One of his achievements was staging Titanic in Kohinoor Theatre, one of the leading mobile theatre groups in Assam.

He died in Nalbari, Assam.
