= Madan Kalita =

Member of Assam Legislative Assembly (1952–2022)

Member of Assam Legislative Assembly
- In office 2001–2006
- Preceded by: Alaka Sarma
- Succeeded by: Alaka Sarma
- Constituency: Nalbari

Personal details
- Political party: Indian National Congress

Madan Kalita (1952 - 2022) was an Indian politician hailing from Nalbari, Assam. Kalita was elected as a legislator of the Assam Legislative Assembly from Nalbari Assembly constituency in 2001.

Kalita was denied as a candidate by the Indian National Congress in 2006, and unsuccessfully contested the Assam assembly elections in 2006 and 2011.

Kalita died on 21 January 2022 following a cardiac arrest.
