= Kalita (caste) =

Indian Hindu caste in Assam

Regions with significant populations
- Assam

Languages
- Assamese

Related ethnic groups
- Indo-Aryan professional caste

Kalita is an ethnic group or a caste of Assamese Hindus belonging to the state of Assam in North East India. (Note: Kangkan Kalita (6 October 2020). "Study traces Kalitas to Himachal in 4122 BC" The Times of India.) Kalita is a forward caste and belongs to General or Unreserved category. According to historians like S.L.Barua, Kalitas started migrating from North and East India to Assam during the 11th century rule of Dharmapal.

Kalita represents the highest category in the tribe-caste continuum of Assamese society. In this process, a tribal neophyte usually belonging to Kachari, Garo, Lalung, Mikir peoples, takes initiation in a Sattra under a Guru and successively discards his own beliefs and habits to be replaced by the Hindu social code. It is also observed that lowercaste groups such as the Sut and even Duliya (a section of Nath Jogis) in an attempt for upward mobility in the caste hierarchy describe themselves as Sut Kalita and Duliya Kalita and this is true for artisan caste like the Kumar, Komar, Sonari, Katani, Nat (Dancers) who attach the term Kalita to their name for similar purposes.

== Origin ==
=== Legendary origins ===
According to the Purana tradition, the Kalitas are considered as pure Aryan, though this is not accepted as absolute truth. Though the Aryan descent theories endorse the arrival of the Kalitas "before the rise of the existing professional castes", the Kalitas generally claim to belong to the Kshatriya caste, and call themselves kulalupta, kula meaning caste and lupta meaning gone (lost caste) in the context of the legend that the Kalitas "were Ksatriyas who fled from the wrath of Parasurama who was determined to exterminate the Ksatriya and later concealed themselves in the forest of Assam."

=== Other hypothesis of origins ===
According to the legends, they are "the non-Vedic Aryans" who are responsible for bringing Aryan culture to Assam. Having mingled with local population, they still preserve certain elements of Aryan culture even after localising their culture to some extent.

B.S. Guha has found similarities between some surnames of "Alpine Nagar Brahmins" of Gujarat with those of North East India, as referred in the Nidhanpur land grants of Kamarupa King Bhaskaravarman (6th century A.D.) such as Datta, Dhara, Deva, Nandi, Sena, and Vasu, etc. and connects them with the Kalitas of Assam. Again, historian Kanaklal Barua mentions these surnames while referring to the Nidhanpur inscription and says that these surnames "now belong almost exclusively to the Bengali Kayasthas".

Few scholars including K.R. Medhi, K.L. Barua, P.C. Choudhuri, M. Neog, B. K. Kakati made speculations by drawing the references of Greek records, words like Kakatiai, Kalaiai, Kaltis, Koudontai, Kudutai, Gurucharitis and few early religious literatures to establish the Kalitas through materials not based on ethnology or anthropology. According to B.C. Allen, all the Hinduised people except Brahmins were Kalita barring other aboriginal groups like Bodo-Kachari.

Mirroring the history of lower Assam, the Kalitas were regarded to be a part of the Koches. They are considered to be the original priestly class of the Koch ethnic group but with the introduction of Brahmins by Biswa Singha, the Kalitas were replaced from their original priesthood position.

== Demand of reservation ==
Since 1988, few people of the Kalita community has been demanding Scheduled Tribe status. All Assam Kalita Janogosthi Student Union (AAKJSU) has demanded 50% reservation in government sector jobs and demanded reservation of 25 MLA seats in Assam, 3 in Lok Sabha and 2 in Rajya Sabha seats from Assam. They also demanded the formation of a Kalita Development Council and the Pagjyotishpur Autonomous Council.

== Notable Kalitas ==
- Maniram Dewan, (17 April 1806 – 26 February 1858) Freedom fighter, one of the first people to establish tea garden in Assam.
- Banikanta Kakati, (15 November 1894 — 15 November 1952) was a prominent linguist, literary figure, critic and scholar in Assamese language with his immense contribution to the language in terms of literature, linguistics, cultural anthropology and comparative religion.

== See also ==
- Kayastha
- Napit (caste)
- Chandala
- Dhupi

== Bibliography ==
=== Printed sources ===
- Cantile, Audrey (1980). CASTE AND SECT IN AN ASSAMESE VILLAGE (Ph.D.). University of London.
- Adhikary, Madhab Chandra (2009). Ethno Cultural Identity Crisis of the Rajbanshis of North Eastern Part of india and Nepal and Bangladesh during the period of 1891 to 1979 (Ph.D.). University of North Bengal. hdl:10603/137486.
- Chatterjee, Suhas (1998). Indian Civilization and Culture. M.D. Publications Pvt. Ltd. ISBN 978-81-7533-083-2.
- Baruah, warnalata (1985). A Comprehensive History of Assam. New Delhi: Munshiram Manoharlal Publishers Pvt. Ltd.
- Sheikh, Amiruzzaman (2012). "The 16th century Koch kingdom: Evolving patterns of sankritization". Proceedings of the Indian History Congress. 73: 249–254. ISSN 2249-1937. JSTOR 44156212.
- Sharma, Chandan Kumar (2009). "Tribe Caste Continuum and the Formation of Assamese Identity". In Medhi, B.K (ed.). Tribes of North-East India: Issues and Challenges. Delhi: Omsons Publications. pp. 354–366.
