= Greater Kamrup =

Greater Kamrup was the historical extent of the political boundaries and culture of Kamrup beyond the current cultural sphere. This particularly concerns the spread of political boundaries of Kamrup Kingdom, through expansion and conquest, but may also refer to the spread of Kamrupi culture to the east and southwards during the early centuries of the Common Era. To the west, expansion of political boundaries towards North Bengal and expansion towards south east to Bengal and North Odisha. The term is tied to the geographic uncertainties surrounding the "Kamrup" during the first millennium and early second millennium.

== See also ==
- Varman dynasty
- Pala dynasty
