= Billeswar Devalaya =

Ancient Hindu temple in Assam, India

Bilbeswar Devalaya
- বিল্বেশ্বৰ দেৱালয়
- Location in Nalbari

Religion
- Affiliation: Hinduism
- District: Nalbari district
- Deity: Shiva
- Festivals: Maha Shivratri & Durga Puja

Location
- Location: Belsor, Nalbari district, Assam
- State: Assam
- Country: India
- Interactive map of Bilbeswar Devalaya
- Coordinates: 26°22′54.6″N 91°21′09.4″E

Architecture
- Type: Hindu temple architecture

Bilbeswar Devalaya (Assamese: বিল্বেশ্বৰ দেৱালয়) in Belsor, Nalbari, Assam is an ancient Hindu temple and is dedicated to Shiva. This temple is believed to have been built 500 years ago. Buffalo sacrifice during Durga Puja is an age-old tradition and ritual in this temple.
