= A Study on Kamrupi =

A study on Kamrupi: A Dialect of Assamese
- Author: Upendranath Goswami
- Language: English
- Subject: Linguistics
- Genre: Non Fiction
- Publisher: Dept. of Historical Antiquarian Studies
- Publication date: 1970
- Publication place: India
- Media type: Print (Hardcover)
- Pages: 312
- ISBN: 81-291-0336-2

A Study on Kamrupi: A Dialect of Assamese is a book on Kamrupi dialect of the Assamese language, written by Upendranath Goswami. It gives detail account of origin and development of Kamrupi language, spanning a period of early first millennium CE to modern times. It discusses the growth of Kamrupi literature, from its apabhramsa stage in form of copper plates, seals, Charyapada to literature developed in mid twentieth century.

== See also ==
- The Moth Eaten Howdah of the Tusker
