= Kumar Bhaskar Varma Sanskrit and Ancient Studies University =

State university in Assam

- Motto: Sarasvati Srutimahatam Mahiyatam (Kālidāsa)
- Motto in English: May the sayings of the wise be glorified
- Type: Public
- Established: 2011 (15 years ago)
- Affiliations: UGC
- Chancellor: Governor of Assam
- Vice-Chancellor: Pralhad R. Joshi
- Location: Namati village, Nalbari, Assam, 781337, India; 26.48°N 91.45°E
- Campus: Urban
- Website: kbvsasun.ac.in

Kumar Bhaskar Varma Sanskrit and Ancient Studies University is a state government university in Nalbari, Assam, India, established in 2011, for studies in Sanskrit language and history of Kamarupa, besides other general studies including art, humanities and professional courses.

== Etymology ==
The name of the university is derived from king Bhaskar Varman of ancient Kamrup.

== Courses ==
The university provides courses on Tantric and Shakti cult, Buddhist philosophy, nature/environment worship, Gandhian studies, etc.

KBVSASU offers undergraduate, postgraduate, and doctoral programs in Sanskrit, Ancient Indian Studies, Philosophy, and other related subjects.

The university's academic programs are designed to provide students with a comprehensive understanding of Sanskrit and Ancient Indian knowledge, as well as their relevance in contemporary society.

== See also ==
- List of Sanskrit universities in India
- Sanskrit revival
- Gauhati University
