= Ashok Sarma =

Indian politician

Member of Assam Legislative Assembly
- In office 2016–2021
- Preceded by: Jayanta Malla Baruah
- Succeeded by: Jayanta Malla Baruah
- Constituency: Nalbari

Personal details
- Party: Bharatiya Janata Party(till 2024) Indian National Congress(from 2024)

Ashok Sarma is an Indian politician from Assam belonging to Bharatiya Janata Party. He was elected to the Assam Legislative Assembly from Nalbari in the 2016 elections.
