= Jayanta Malla Baruah =

Indian politician

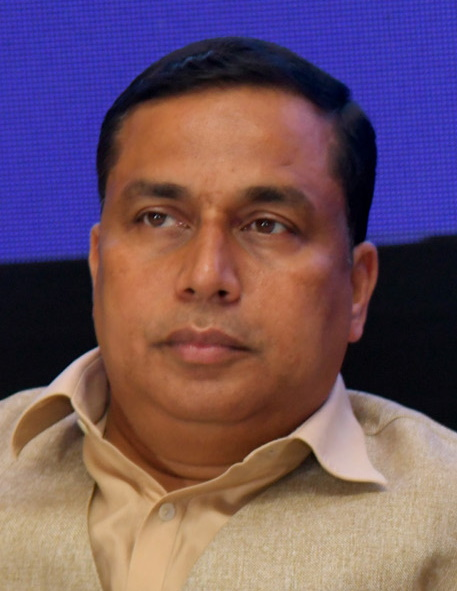

Cabinet Minister, Assam
- Incumbent
- Assumed office 5 June 2026
- Chief Minister: Himanta Biswa Sarma
- Departments: Finance; Environment and Forest; Mines and Minerals
- Preceded by: Himanta Biswa Sarma
- In office 9 June 2022 – 11 May 2026
- Chief Minister: Himanta Biswa Sarma
- Departments: Public Health Engineering (2022–2026); Housing and Urban Affairs (2024–2026)
- Preceded by: Ranjeet Kumar Dass (PHE)
- Succeeded by: Himanta Biswa Sarma

Member, Assam Legislative Assembly
- Incumbent
- Assumed office 2 May 2021
- Preceded by: Ashok Sarma
- Constituency: Nalbari
- In office 13 May 2011 – 19 May 2016
- Preceded by: Alaka Sarma
- Succeeded by: Ashok Sarma

Personal details
- Born: 23 October 1971 (age 54)
- Party: Bharatiya Janata Party (from 2015); Indian National Congress (until 2015)
- Spouse: Julee Deka Baruah
- Children: 2
- Education: B. Borooah College
- Occupation: Politician

Jayanta Malla Baruah (born 23 October 1971) is an Indian politician. A member of the Assam Legislative Assembly, he was first elected for a single term in 2011 representing the Indian National Congress, but switched to the Bharatiya Janata Party in 2015. He re-entered the Assembly in the 2021 election and currently serves in the Second Sarma ministry with responsibility for Finance, Environment and Forest, and Mines and Minerals.

== Political career ==
Baruah began his political career with the Indian National Congress and was first elected to the Nalbari constituency in 2011, winning against the sitting member, Alaka Sarma of the Asom Gana Parishad. He switched to the Bharatiya Janata Party in 2015 and was defeated in the 2016 election.

From 2017 to 2021 he was political secretary to the Chief Minister, Himanta Biswa Sarma, and chairman of the Assam Tourism Development Corporation. Known as a close associate of Sarma, he was reelected to the Nalbari seat in the 2021 election representing the BJP, winning the seat again in 2026 with more than 60,000 votes. Baruah enjoyed significant support from Sarma during campaigning in the 2026 election.
