= Kamrupi lokgeet =

Folk songs in Kamrupi dialect

Kamrupi Lokgeet performance was presented by Khanindra Deka and Bhagaban Deka

Kamrupi Lokgeet is popular form of folk music that expresses thoughts and emotion of the Kamrupi people. The songs are derived from Ancient Kamrup. The language of Kamrupi lokgeet are different dialects and ancestral forms of Assamese, including Early Assamese, Kamrupi dialects and Standard Assamese.

== History ==
These songs have been sung from time immemorial by peoples of Kamrup region. Beside this forms of songs linking the day-to-day activities are also popular, like marriage songs (biyar geet), now khelar (boat race) geet, maha kheda (mosquito drive out) geet, child's play geet, fishing geet, lullabye geet and harvest festival geets. Considerably influenced by a class of Vaishnava songs of the highest sophistication and refinement, both literary and musical, the Kamrupi Lokgeets, although sung to the humble dolara and the dagar (or khanjari) demonstrate great intricacy. It is known for richness of musical modes.

== See also ==
- Indian folk music
- Indian classical music
- Kamrupi language
- Old Kamrupi
- Rameshwar Pathak
- A Study on Kamrupi
