= Assam State Museum =

Museum in Assam, India

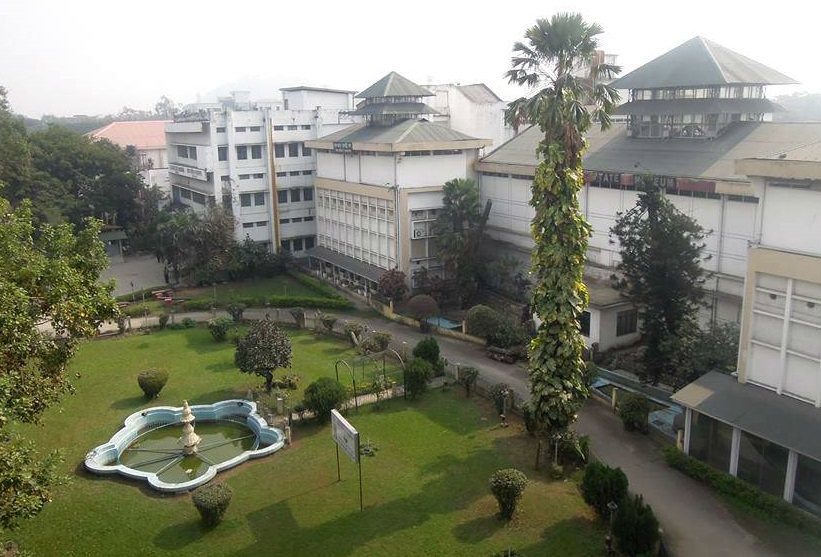
- Established: 1940; 86 years ago
- Location: G.N.B. Road, Guwahati, India
- Coordinates: 26.1853352°N 91.7519043°E

Assam State Museum, previously Assam Provincial Museum, is located in the southern end of Dighalipukhuri tank which is in the heart of Guwahati city, Assam. The Museum was established by the Kamarupa Anusandhan Samiti (Assam Research Society) in 1940. The late Kanaklal Barua was the founder and president. In the year 1953, it was taken over by the Assam State Government.

== Collections ==
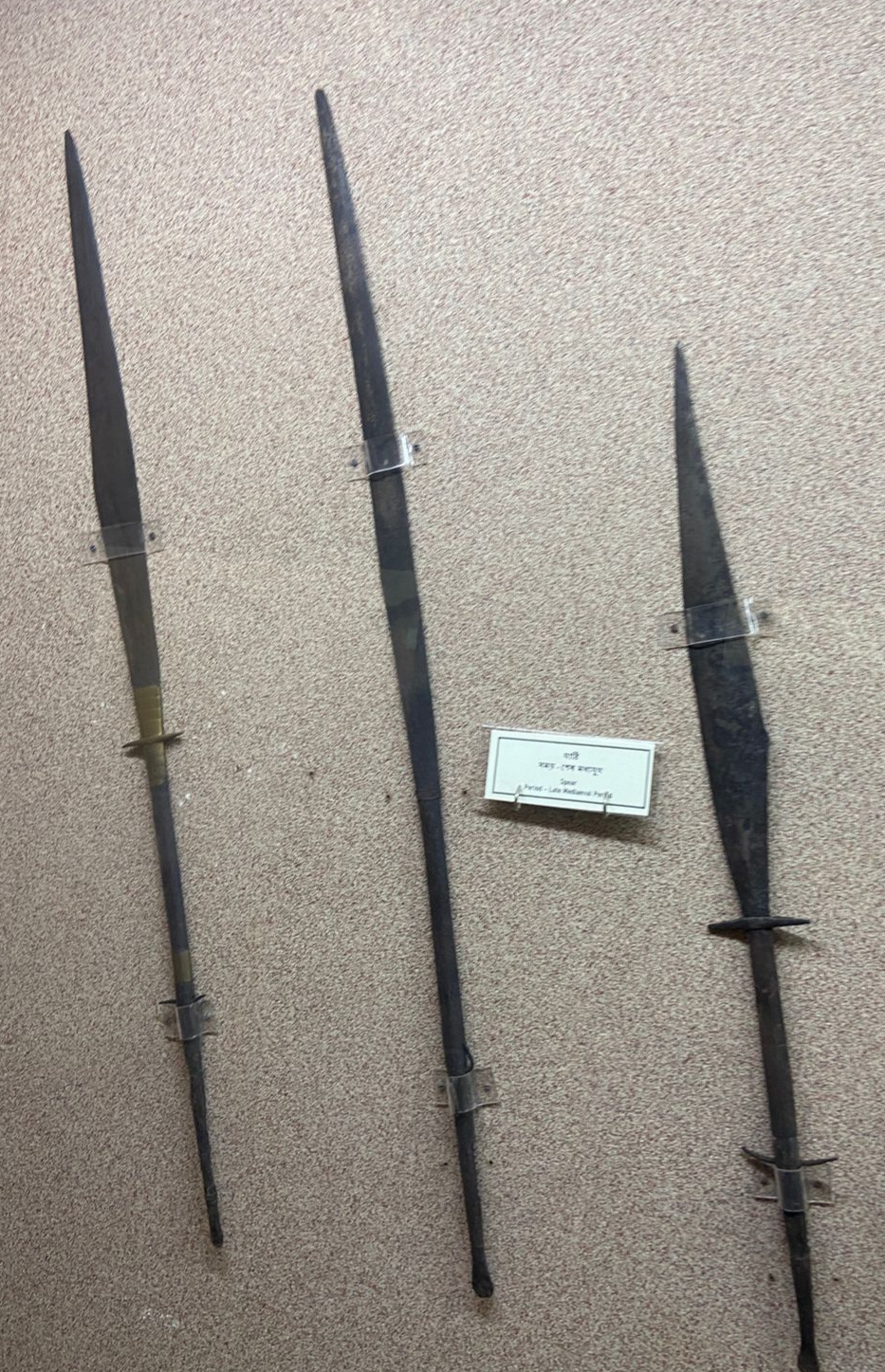
Ahom spear heads exhibited in Assam State Museum

The exhibits of the Museum are displayed under different sections, viz., Epigraphy, Sculptures, Miscellaneous, Natural History, art and Crafts, Anthropology & Folk Art & Arms section. The sculptures from the Assam region fall into four principal categories – stone, wood, metal and terracotta. The collections which are on display here, are very rare.

The library in Assam State Museum was established in 1985 and is rich in its stenographic collections. There are various periodicals, journals and books relating to art, culture, mythology, biography, encyclopedic works and even the Asiatic Society journals of the country.

== Visiting Hours ==
The museum remains open 06 days from 10:00am – 5:00pm during summers and from 10:00am – 4:30pm during winters except on Mondays; 2nd and 4th Saturday and Government Holidays.

== See also ==
- List of museums in India
