= Archdale Earle =

British Indian Administrator

Sir Archdale Earle, KCSI KCIE (12 March 1861 – 10 November 1934) was a British Indian administrator and former Chief Commissioner of Assam Province.

== Biography ==
Ealre was born in 1861 and educated from Uppingham School and Oxford University. In 1882, he joined Indian Civil Service (I.C.S.) as Assistant Collector and Magistrate in British India. He was appointed Private Secretary to Lieutenant Governor of Bengal Presidency in 1886. Earle became the Excise Commissioner, Bengal in 1901, Secretary to Board of Revenue in 1902 and served as Secretary to the Government of Bengal in between 1903 and 1905. He was also appointed Director of Public Instruction in 1906 after Alfred Croft. Earle also served as Chairman, Corporation of Calcutta since 1909 to 1910.

In 1909 and 1911 he was designated as Order of the Indian Empire, the Companion (CIE) and the Knight Commander (KCIE), respectively. After serving as the Secretary to Government of India, Home Department he was appointed Chief Commissioner of Assam in 1912. During this period Sir Earle worked hard to establish colleges and educational institutes in India, associated with BRM Government Law College and Kamarupa Anusandhan Samiti.
