= Alaka Sarma =

Indian politician

Member of Assam Legislative Assembly
- In office 2000–2001
- Preceded by: Nagen Sarma
- Succeeded by: Madan Kalita
- Constituency: Nalbari
- In office 2006–2011
- Preceded by: Madan Kalita
- Succeeded by: Jayanta Malla Baruah
- Constituency: Nalbari

Personal details
- Political party: Asom Gana Parishad
- Spouse: Nagen Sarma

Dr. Alaka Desai Sarma (mostly known as Alaka Sarma) is a two-time MLA from the Nalbari constituency of Assam Legislative assembly, and a woman activist, who joined Asom Gana Parishad after the assassination of her husband. Sarma first won the by-poll following the death of then MLA Nagen Sarma of the Nalbari constituency in 2000 for a period of 1 year. In 2001, Sarma lost to Indian National Congress candidate Madan Kalita. In 2006, Sarma won the Assam Legislative assembly election from the Nalbari constituency.

In 2019, Sarma was appointed Commissioner of 'Parents Responsibility and Norms for Accountability and Monitoring (PRANAM) Commission' by the Assam government.

Dr. Alaka Sarma was the wife of the former Assam PWD minister Nagen Sarma, who was assassinated by ULFA on 27 February 2000.

== Footnotes ==
- Assam Legislative Assembly election, 2006 : Nalbari
