= Nalbari Assembly constituency =

Assembly constituency of Assam, India

Nalbari
- Constituency No. 39 for the Assam Legislative Assembly

Constituency details
- Country: India
- Region: Northeast India
- State: Assam
- Division: Lower Assam
- District: Nalbari
- Lok Sabha constituency: Barpeta
- Established: 1962
- Reservation: None

Member of Legislative Assembly
- 16th Assam Legislative Assembly
- Incumbent Jayanta Malla Baruah
- Party: BJP
- Alliance: NDA
- Elected year: 2026

The Nalbari Assembly constituency is number 59 out of 126 in the Assam Legislative Assembly. The assembly constituency comes under the Barpeta Lok Sabha constituency.

== Members of Legislative Assembly ==
Election	Member	Party affiliation
1978	Narendra Nath Dutta	Communist Party of India (Marxist)
1983	Chandradhar Kalita	Independent
1985	Nagen Sarma	Independent
1991	Nagen Sarma	Asom Gana Parishad
1996	Nagen Sarma	Asom Gana Parishad
2000^	Alaka Sarma	Asom Gana Parishad
2001	Madan Kalita	Indian National Congress
2006	Alaka Sarma	Asom Gana Parishad
2011	Jayanta Malla Baruah	Indian National Congress
2016	Ashok Sarma	Bharatiya Janata Party
2021	Jayanta Malla Baruah	Bharatiya Janata Party
2026	Jayanta Malla Baruah	Bharatiya Janata Party

== Election results ==
=== 2026 ===
2026 Assam Legislative Assembly election: Nalbari
Party	Candidate	Votes	%	±%
BJP	Jayanta Malla Baruah	118,611	64.98	+6.14
INC	Ashok Sarma	58,510	32.05	+0.62
SUCI(C)	Kenedi Pegu	995	0.55	+0.07
Independent	Samsul Haque	472	0.26	New
Independent	Safar Ali	354	0.19	New
Independent	Muktar Hussain	954	0.52	New
NOTA	None of the above	2,644	1.45	+0.45
Margin of victory		60,101	32.93	+5.52
Turnout		182,540	90.46	+3.69
Registered electors				
BJP hold		Swing		

=== 2021 ===
2021 Assam Legislative Assembly election: Nalbari
Party	Candidate	Votes	%	±%
BJP	Jayanta Malla Baruah	106,190	58.84	▼4.08
INC	Pradyut Kumar Bhuyan	56,733	31.43	▲2.18
AJP	Nagen Deka	11,778	6.53	▲6.53
AITC	Gopi Baruah	1,389	0.77	N/A
Independent	Keshab Barman	1,150	0.64	N/A
SUCI(C)	Kenedi Pegu	855	0.48	▲0.36
Independent	Apurba Pathak	575	0.32	N/A
None of the Above	None of the Above	1,808	1.00	0
Majority		49,457	27.41	▼6.26
Turnout		1,80,485	86.77	▼0.27
Registered electors		2,07,223		
BJP hold		Swing	▼4.08	

=== 2016 ===
2016 Assam Legislative Assembly election: Nalbari
Party	Candidate	Votes	%	±%
BJP	Ashok Sarma	99,131	62.92	+52.28
INC	Pradyut Kumar Bhuyan	46,087	29.25	−4.68
Independent	Khurshid Alam	3,608	2.29	N/A
Independent	Shristi Sarma	3,028	1.92	N/A
CPI(M)	Maheshwar Dutta	1,676	1.06	−2.86
Independent	Harinarayan Das	698	0.44	N/A
Independent	Jyotirmay Goswami	611	0.38	N/A
Independent	Maharishi Parasar Chakravarty	398	0.25	N/A
Independent	Gopi Baruah	271	0.17	N/A
JD(U)	Jiten Kalita	229	0.14	N/A
SUCI(C)	Munindra Doley	222	0.14	−0.27
NOTA	None of the above	1,576	1.00	N/A
Majority		53,044	33.67	+26.68
Turnout		1,57,535	87.04	+12.49
Registered electors		1,80,991		
BJP gain from INC		Swing		

=== 2011 ===
2011 Assam Legislative Assembly election: Nalbari
Party	Candidate	Votes	%	±%
INC	Jayanta Malla Baruah	39,896	33.93	+0.94
AGP	Alaka Sarma	31,673	26.94	−17.95
AITC	Anjan Barman	15,970	13.58	N/A
BJP	Dilip Saikia	12,507	10.64	−4.53
Independent	Madan Kalita	9,615	8.18	N/A
CPI(M)	Rabin Misra	4,613	3.92	N/A
Independent	Dipika Dutta	1,411	1.20	N/A
Independent	Nanda Medhi	842	0.72	N/A
NCP	Taijuddin Ahmed	562	0.48	N/A
SUCI(C)	Sabitri Deka	480	0.41	N/A
Majority		8,223	6.99	−4.91
Turnout		1,17,569	74.55	−0.66
INC gain from AGP		Swing		

=== 2006 ===
Assam Legislative Assembly election, 2006: Nalbari
Party	Candidate	Votes	%	±%
AGP	Alaka Sarma	55,104	44.89	
INC	Madan Kalita	40,489	32.99	
BJP	Ashok Sarma	18,623	15.17	
AIUDF	Gautam Pratap Goswami	4,055	3.30	
Independent	Chandradhar Kalita	1,563	1.27	
Independent	Narayan Pathak	1,344	1.09	
AGP(P)	Nripal Barma	961	0.78	
LKS	Satya Ram Talukdar	606	0.49	
Majority		14,615	11.90	
Turnout		1,22,745	75.21	
AGP gain from INC		Swing		
