= Nalbariya dialect =

Dialect of Assamese

Nalbariya dialect is a dialect of Assamese language spoken primarily in and around the Nalbari district of Assam. It is one of three of the Kamrupi group of dialects—the others being Barpetia dialect and Palasbariya dialect.

== Phonology ==
Vowels
	Front			Central			Back		
	IPA	ROM	Script	IPA	ROM	Script	IPA	ROM	Script
Close	i	i	ই/ঈ				u	u	উ/ঊ
Near-close							ʊ	ú	ও
Close-mid	e	é	এ’						
Open-mid	ɛ	e	এ				ɔ	o	অ
Open				a	a	আ			

Nalbariya has seven vowels, identical to Barpetia dialect, and almost identical to Standard Assamese, which has an additional vowel.
