= Makhibaha =

- Village
- Location in Assam, India Makhibaha (India)
- Coordinates: 26.4379715°N 91.2540078°E
- Country: India
- State: Assam
- District: Nalbari

Government
  - Body: Makhibaha Village Development Committee

Languages
  - Official: Assamese
- Time zone: UTC+5:30 (IST)
- Postal code: 781374
- Vehicle registration: AS

Makhibaha is a historical village passing through so many years with many historic events. It is said that in later 14th century, Sree Sree Sankardev’s ancestor Gadadhar Bhuya was the "bhuya" of its nearby area. At that time it was surrounded by jungle and these jungles are full of bees which is in Assamese are called mou-makhi and so the name of the village is Makhibaha.

This village is under Tihu Police Station, Nalbari (Assam). The village is 90 km away from Guwahati, 20 km away from Nalbari, 70 km from Dispur, and 3 km away from Tihu Railway station. Pin code 781374.

There are 21 neighbouring chubas in Makhibaha. The population of Makhibaha is approximately 15,000. Most of people in this village depend upon agriculture. A large number of them are also engaged at government sectors and few in business.

Makhibaha has fifteen primary schools, one higher secondary school including both science and arts stream, one girls high school one venture high school, one Swaraswati Sikhu Niketan, one Jatiya Bidyalaya and one government technical school, B K S Motor Driving School.

The village is surrounded by Tihu in the north, Kshetri Dharmapur and Bhojkuchi in the south, Haribhanga in the east and Jalkhana in the west.

Many Bhutanese traders, used to come every year to the village fair, in Makhibaha Sabha which was a rural socio-religious fair in western Assam, and they used to sell products from Bhutan till the late eighties.
