= Parbati Charan Das =

- Born: 1 January 1923; Pathsala
- Died: 6 October 1949 (aged 26); Kargil
- Relatives: Baliram Das (father)
- Military career
- Branch: Indian Army
- Rank: Lieutenant
- Unit: 4th Bn 11 Gorkha Rifles

Parbati Charan Das (1923–1949) was first Kargil martyr of India, made supreme sacrifice when trying to cross river Indus in October 1949.

== Early life ==
He passed his matriculation from Cotton Collegiate School, Gauhati; went for military training in Bangalore Military Officers Training School and joined the Indian Army in 1946.

He topped in the inter-Army athletic meet in the pole vault and long jump. During his stay in Calcutta, he was a team member of the Mohun Bagan football team where he captivated all his ball control and possessing skills.

== Background ==
Immediately after independence, India Army faced challenge of incursion of Pakistan backed militants in Jammu & Kashmir. Though Army generally successful in repulsing this militants, but prolonged battle required control of strategic icy heights in the Kashmir sector.

In October 1949 4th Bn 11 Gorkha Rifles was deployed in Kargil sector. Unit was entrusted with task of setting up a communication network in hostile environment of area. Lieutenant Parbati Charan Das was given the task of setting up a telecommunication line with Coy headquarters in Chulichang village on the left bank of the Indus river in the Kargil sector, an area was full of rough terrain and ice cold rivers. On 5 October, Lieutenant Das had personally reconnoitered the place from where he wanted to establish the telephone cable across the river. The next morning, Lieutenant Das, along with his two signallers, went to the right bank of the Indus river to accomplish the mission. He made several attempts to throw the cable across the fast flowing river.

All attempts are gone in vain, in last resort Lieutenant Das decided to swim across the icy cool river, amidst high currents. He tied one end of the cable around his waist, after having checked all the knots and moorings of the cable. Two fellows along with him requested not to attempt such risky venture. But without caring about his own personal safety, he plunged into the river. An expert swimmer, Lieutenant Das swam across about three fourths of the river. But when he was just nearing the other bank of the river, he got caught in an extremely cold current and started going down the river. The two signallers who had the other end of the cable in their hands tried to pull him out of the icy cold waters. But, due to the strong currents, the cable gave way. Lieutenant Das fought a losing battle and was swept away. Vigorous search attempts were made to trace his body, but in vain.

== Aftermath ==
The incident moved the nation. Then prime minister of India, Jawahar Lal Nehru wrote a letter in his own hand to the father of deceased Lieutenant, The entire Army, led by the Commander- in- Chief Gen K M Cariappa, condoled the death of Lieutenant Das. The then Commanding Officer of Lieut Das, Lt Col R P Yadava, in his letter to Baliram Das, wrote: "An ordinary officer of common mettle would never have dared to swim the flowing and tortuous Indus, but for gallant and brave Parbati, no obstacle of any description could deter him from achieving his object. He gave his life for the country. In him we have lost one of the finest officers of the Army. He has set an example for us and made a name for the regiment." The Army made a number of correspondences with Baliram Das. But, the untimely death of his only son shattered him and he died soon after.

== Recognition ==
In memorial of his sacrifice and bravery, a silver trophy has been instituted as "Das Memorial Football Championship". The Das Memorial Football Tournament is a prestigious tournament of the 11 Gorkha Rifles and has been going on since 1966. The silver trophy has the figure of Lieutenant Das on top of it.

== See also ==
- Shaitan Singh
