= Kamrupi dance =

Kamrupi dance is group of dances originating in ancient Kamrup, forming one of the cultural norm of region.

== Origin ==
Kamrupi dance originated from Bhaona dance.

== Types ==
Phalguni, Gita, Karnarjuna along with others are variants of Kamrupi dance.

== See also ==
- Kamrupi Dholiya
- Kamrupi Lokgeet
- Prachin Kamrupi Nritya Sangha
