= Kamrupi =

Kamrupi or Kamarupi may refer to:

- of, from, or related to the ancient Indian region of Kamarupa or the modern Kamrup region of in the Indian state of Assam, both in northeastern Indian
  - Kamarupi Prakrit, Middle Indo-Aryan language (5th-12th centuries) spoken in Kamarupa
  - Kamarupi script, ancestral script of Assamese and Bengali languages
  - Kamrupi dialects, modern dialects of the Assamese language spoken in Kamrup, Assam, India
    - Kamrupi people, native speakers of Kamrupi language
  - Kamrupi Brahmin, a caste in Assam, India
  - Kamrupi dholiya

== See also ==
- Kamrup (disambiguation)
- Kamrupi crafts, handicrafts from Kamrup
- Kamrupi culture, culture of Kamrup
- Kamrupi dance, dances from Kamrup
- Kamrupi Lokgeet, folk songs in Kamrupi dialect
- Kamrupi literature, literature from Kamrup
