= Barpetia dialect =

Kamrupi dialect of India

Barpetia
- Borpeita
- বৰপেইটা
- Native to: India
- Region: Western Kamrup region,
- Ethnicity: Not ethnic dialect
- Language family: Indo-European: Indo-Iranian; Indo-Aryan; Eastern; Bengali–Assamese; Assamese; Kamrupi dialect; Barpetia
- Writing system: Assamese script, Kamarupi script (Historical)

Language codes
- ISO 639-3: –
- Glottolog: None

Barpetia dialect (native: borpeita) is a modern regional subdialect of Kamrupi, a dialect of the Assamese language. Named after the current Barpeta district of Assam, it is the westernmost of the Kamrupi group of dialects. This dialect has community variations within itself.

== Characteristics ==
- Whereas most of the other Kamrupi dialects have a seven-term vowel system, Barpetia has eight.
- Whereas most of the other Kamrupi dialects follow a four-term verb system, Barpetia follows a five-five term system

== Grammar ==
=== Verb ===
For different types of verbs.

Tense	Person	ko "tell"		kha "consume"		ni "take away"		dhu "wash"		kor "do"		sus "comp"		azz "earn"	
Tense	Person	+	-	+	-	+	-	+	-	+	-	+	-	+	-
Simple Present	1st per.	koũ	nokoũ	khaũ	nakhaũ ~ nakhöũ ~ nakhoŋ	neũ	nenũ	dhuŋ	nudhuŋ	köru	nokru	susu	nussu	azzu	nazzu
Simple Present	2nd per. inf.	ka	naka	kha	nakha	nia	nena	dhua	nudhua	köra	nokra	susa	nussa	azza	nazza
Simple Present	2nd per. pol.	koa	nokoa	khawa	nakhawa	nia / newa	nena	dhua	nudhua	kora	nokra	susa	nussa	azza / azzoa	nazza / nazzoa
Simple Present	2nd per. hon. & 3rd per.	koe	nokoe	khae	nakhae	nie	nene	dhue	nudhue	kore	nokre	suse	nusse	azze	nazze
Present continuous	1st per.	koi asu	koi thaka nai	khai asu	khai thaka nai	ni asu	ni thaka nai	dhui asu	dhui thaka nai	köri asu	kori thaka nai	susi asu	susi thaka nai	azzi asu	azzi thaka nai
Present continuous	2nd per. inf.	koi asa	koi thaka nai	khai asa	khai thaka nai	ni asa	ni thaka nai	dhui asa	dhui thaka nai	köri asa	kori thaka nai	susi asa	susi thaka nai	azzi asa	azzi thaka nai
Present continuous	2nd per. pol.	koi asa/asöa	koi thaka nai	khai asa/asöa	khai thaka nai	ni asa/asöa	ni thaka nai	dhui asa/asöa	dhui thaka nai	kori asa/asöa	kori thaka nai	susi asa/asöa	susi thaka nai	azzi asa/asöa	azzi thaka nai
Present continuous	2nd per. hon. & 3rd per.	koi ase	koi thaka nai	khai ase	khai thaka nai	ni ase	ni thaka nai	dhui ase	dhui thaka nai	kori ase	kori thaka nai	susi ase	susi thaka nai	azzi ase	azzi thaka nai
Present Perfect	1st per.	koisu	nokoisu	khaisu	nakhaisu / nakhoisu	nisu	nensu	dhuisu	nudhuisu	kossu	nokossu	susisu	nussisu	azzisu	nazzisu
Present Perfect	2nd per. inf.	koisa	nokoisa	khaisa	nakhaisa / nakhoisa	nisa	nensa	dhuisa	nudhuisa	kossa	nokossa	susisa	nussisa	azzisa	nazzisa
Present Perfect	2nd per. pol.	koisa / koisöa	nokoisa / nokoisöa	khaisa / khaisöa	nakhaisa / nakhoisa / nakhaisöa / nakhoisöa	nisa / nisöa	nensa / nensöa	dhuisa / dhuisöa	nudhuisa / nudhuisöa	kossa / kossöa	nokossa / nokossöa	susisa / susisöa	nussisa / nussisöa	azzisa / azzisöa	nazzisa / nazzisöa
Present Perfect	2nd per. hon. & 3rd per.	koise	nokoise	khaise	nakhaise / nakhoise	nise	nense	dhuise	nudhuise	kosse	nokosse	susise	nussise	azzise	nazzise
Recent Past	1st per.	kolu	nokoisu	khalu	nakhalu ~ nakhölu	nilu	nenlu	dhulu	nudhlu	kollu	nokollu	suslu	nususlu	azzilu	nazzilu
Recent Past	2nd per. inf.	koli	nokoli	khali	nakhali / nakholi	nila	nenli	dhuli	nudhli	kolli	nokolli	susli	nususli	azzila	nazzila
Recent Past	2nd per. pol.	kola	nokola	khala	nakhala ~ nakhola	nila	nenla	dhula	nudhla	kolla	nokolla	susla	nususla	azzila	nazzila
Recent Past	2nd per. hon. & 3rd per.	kolak	nokolak	khalak	nakhalak ~ nakholak	nilak	nenlak	dhulak	nudhlak	kollak	nokollak	suslak	nususlak	azzilak	nazzilak
Distant Past	1st per.	koisilu	nokoisilu	khaisilu	nakhoisilu	nisilu	nensilu	dhuisilu	nudhlu	kossilu	nokossilu	susisilu	nususisilu	azzisilu	nazzisilu
Distant Past	2nd per. inf.	koisili	nokoisili	khaisili	nakhoisili	nisila	nensili	dhuisili	nudhuisili	koisili	nokossili	susisili	nususisili	azzisili	nazzili
Distant Past	2nd per. pol.	koisila	nokoisila	khaisila	nakhoisila	nisila	nensila	dhuisila	nudhuisila	koisila	nokoisila	susisila	nususisila	azzisila	nazzisila
Distant Past	2nd per. hon. & 3rd per.	koisil	nokoisil	khaisil	nakhoisil	nisil	nensil	dhuisil	nudhuisil	kossil	nokossil	susisil	nususisil	azzisil	nazzisil
