= Kamrup =

Kamrup or Kamarupa or variation may refer to:

- Kamarupa (350–1140), also known as Pragjyotisha, an early state during the classical period of India, the first historical kingdom of Assam
- Pragjyotisha Kingdom, a kingdom in Hindu mythology
- Pragjyotisha, former name of Guwahati, the capital of Kamarupa and a modern metropolis in Assam, India
- Kamrup region, a region in Lower Assam, India between the Manas and Barnadi rivers
  - Kamrup district, or Kamrup rural district, an administrative district
  - Kamrup Metropolitan district, an administrative district
  - Undivided Kamrup district, a former administrative district
- Kamarupa (Theosophy), concept of kama (desire in Indian philosophy) in Theosophy

== See also ==
- Kamrupi (disambiguation)
- Kamarupa Pithas, ancient geographical divisions of Kamrupa
- Kamarupa – Late to end period, Kamarupa kingdom from mid-seventh to twelfth-century (covering the Mlechchha and the Pala (Kamarupa) dynasty
- Cultural development of Kamarupa
- Kamarupa Anusandhan Samiti, a research society on ancient Kamrup studies
- Greater Kamrup, the historical extent of the political boundaries and culture of Kamrup beyond the current cultural sphere
- Kamrup Ki Kahani, television serial
- Kamrup Express, a daily express train
