= Prachin Kamrupi Nritya Sangha =

Prachin Kamrupi Nritya Sangha is troupe for preservation and promotion of ancient Kamrupi dance forms. Since its formation it helped in renewing interest in forgotten dance forms of region.

== Establishment ==
It was formed in April 1938, by Jibeswar Goswami and Suresh Chandra Goswami with a vision to conserve dying ancient dance forms of Kamrup region.

== Role ==
Many ancient Kamrupi systems of dancing, were revived by the Prachin Kamarupi Nritya Sangha, despite having a hard time drawing public interest, raising funds and in keeping body and soul together.

== See also ==
- Kamrupi dance
