= Birdatta Choudhury =

Indian revolutionary

Birdatta Choudhury was a rebel, who with his brother Haradatta Choudhury, tried to rebelled against the Ahom monarchy with the help of Burkandazes, however he was captured and his eyeballs were extracted and sent of Jorhat.
