= Nagen Sarma =

Indian politician

Nagen Sarma was an Indian politician hailing from Assam. Nagen was the general secretary of Asom Gana Parishad. He was a three-time MLA from Nalbari constituency and served as the public works and forest minister for the Government of Assam.

== Death ==
On Feb 27, 2000, Sarma was killed in a car ambush by United Liberation Front of Asom (ULFA). Intelligence agencies had alerted the state government the previous year that three cabinet ministers, including Sarma, were vulnerable to attacks by the separatists.
