= Kamrupi dialects =

Dialect of Assamese

Kamrupi
- Pronunciation: /ˈkæmruːpi/
- Native to: India
- Region: Kamrup region
- Ethnicity: Kamrupi people
- Language family: Indo-European: Indo-Iranian; Indo-Aryan; Eastern; Bengali-Assamese; Assamese; Kamrupi
- Dialects: Barpetia dialect Nalbariya dialect Palasbaria dialect
- Writing system: Assamese alphabet

Language codes
- ISO 639-3: –
- Glottolog: None
- Distribution of Kamrupi dialects in pink.

Kamrupi dialects are a group of regional dialects of Assamese, spoken in the Kamrup region. It formerly enjoyed prestige status. It is one of two western dialect groups of the Assamese language, the other being Goalpariya. Kamrupi is heterogeneous with three subdialects— Barpetia dialect, Nalbariya dialect and Palasbaria dialect.

In medieval times, Kamrupi was used in the Brahmaputra Valley and its adjoining areas for literary purposes in parallel with Sanskrit, both for prose and poetry. This went against the practices of literary figures of mid India like Vidyapati who used Sanskrit for prose and Maithili for poetry. In more recent times, the South Kamrupi dialect has been used in the works of author Indira Goswami. Poet and nationalist Ambikagiri Raichoudhury also used Kamrupi in his works to great extent. In 2018, the Kamrupi film Village Rockstars became the first from the region to be selected for India's official entry to the 91st Academy Awards. In 1996, another Kamrupi dialect film named Adajya directed by Santwana Bardoloi based on a novel by Indira Goswami titled Dontal Haatir Uiye Khuwa Haoda won the Indian National award as the Best Regional Film (Assamese) and Jury's special award.

== Features ==
=== Phonology ===
Vowels
	Front			Central			Back		
	IPA	ROM	Script	IPA	ROM	Script	IPA	ROM	Script
Close	i	i	ই/ঈ				u	u	উ/ঊ
Near-close							ʊ	ú	ও
Close-mid	e	é	এ’						
Open-mid	ɛ	e	এ				ɔ	o	অ
Open				a	a	আ			

The Kamrupi dialects have seven phonemes in contrast to the eight in standard Assamese dialect. The phoneme that is missing in the Kamrupi dialects is the close-mid back rounded vowel /o/ (অ’). In the Kamrupi dialects, this vowel is replaced by another vowel, a diphthong or a different form.

Replaced by		Early Assamese		Standard Assamese		Kamrupi	
অ	ɔ	ভৈল	bhoilo	হ’ল	/hol/	হল	/hɔl/
অ	ɔ	হুইবে	huibe	হ’ব	/ɦobɔ/	হবো	/ɦɔbʊ/
আ	a	কলা	kola	ক’লা	/kola/	কালা	/kala/
উ	u			ব’ল	/bol/	বুল	/bul/
এ	ɛ	গৈল	goilo	গ’ল	/ɡol/	গেল	/ɡɛl/
ও	ʊ	কৈত, কহিত	koito, kohito	ক’ত	/kot/	কোত	/kʊt/
ওই	ʊi	ৰহিল, ৰহিলেক, ৰহিলা, ৰহিলন্ত	rohilo, rohileko, rohila, rohilonto	ৰ’ল, ৰ’লে	/ɹol/, /ɹolɛ/	ৰোইল, ৰোইলাক	/ɾʊil/, /ɾʊilak/

- The treatment of ks as kh which is a notable feature in Early Assamese and the Kamrupi dialect has been found in Kamarupa inscriptions, such as inscriptions of Ratna Pala where ksitimatha>khimatha was used.
- One of the most prominent features of Kamrupi is the use of initial stress, as opposed to penultimate stress in the eastern dialects, which effectively shortens the word (komora, Eastern dialect; kumra, Kamrupi dialect). Though standard Assamese follows the pan-Indian system of penultimate, Kamrupi shares the initial stress, with some difference, with the Bengali, where the initial stress system established itself as the dominant feature in the 16th century. In Kamrupi dialect too, the initial stress is a later development which is a result of contact with some linguistic group.
- Medial vowels are thus rarely pronounced or largely slurred over.
- In standard Assamese if a word has two /a/ sounds side-by-side, the first /a/ turns into an /ɔ/ or /ɛ/, a feature that became prominent in writings of Hema Saraswati, Harivara Vipra, Kaviratna Saraswati etc. In Kamrupi, two consecutive /a/ are tolerated (star: /taɹa/ (Kamrupi), /tɔɹa/ (Standard)). The early Assamese used pan Indian system of tolerance of both the parallel /a/. In disyllabic words, the second /ɔ/ becomes an /a/ (hot: /gɔɹam/, Kamrupi; /gɔɹɔm/, St. Assamese).
- Epenthetic vowels are the rule in Kamrupi dialects, with even diphthongs and triphthongs appearing in initial syllables (haula Kam; haluwa St) (keuila Kam; kewaliya St), and a complete absence of diphthongs in the final syllables.
- High vowels are feature of Kamrupi, in contrast to predominance of medial vowels in Standard Assamese. Kapur, tule, mul, tamul and khalu in eastern Assamese as against Kapor (cloth), tole (raises), mol (worth), tamol (betel-nut) and khalo (I have eaten) in Kamrupi.
- The east Assamese favours de-aspiration as against aspiration of Kamrupi in same phonological context.
- /x/ does not occurs finally in Kamrupi, it does sometimes in eastern Assamese. In non-initial position Old Indo-Aryan sibilants become /kh/ and sometimes /h/, whereas in eastern Assamese it becomes /x/, e.g. Akha (Kamrupi) and Axa (Standard Assamese).

=== Morphology ===
- Western Assamese shares morphological peculiarities with North Bengali. The plural suffixes in Western Assamese -hamra and -gila have parallel forms in North Bengali -amrah, the remote demonstrative plural and -gila, -gla. The plural suffixes of Kamrupi are very different from the eastern Assamese (Kamrupi: -gila, -gilak; Standard: -bür, -bilak). Kamrupi plural suffixes has continuity from ancient times, as opposed to late medieval appearance of bür and bilak in Eastern Assam.
- Standard uses -loi in the dative case ending, Kamrupi uses the dative-accusative case ending -k or the locative -t (Kamrupi: ghorot/ghorok zaü̃; Standard ghoroloi zaü̃).
- The instrumental sense -di in Kamrupi is increasingly accepted in the Standard now (Kamrupi:hatedi; Standard: hatere).
- Kamrupi has large variety of adverbial formations such as - ita, - ethen, - enke and - kahai, which are quite different in Eastern Assamese.
- Pleonastic suffixes of East Assamese are distinct from those of Kamrupi like - ni, - na, - holi.
- The enclitic definites are separate in both the languages.
- In the Eastern variety - heten is used for past conditional, as against Kamrupi - hoi.
- Formation of verbs from nouns and participles are more common in Kamrupi than Eastern Assamese.
- Kamrupi has - lak and - ilak for third personal affix while East Assamese uses - le and - ile for the same (Kamrupi: xi khalak; Standard: xi khale).

=== Similarities with Eastern Assamese ===
According to Upendranath Goswami, differences between Kamrupi and east Assamese is not insignificant, they ranged over whole field of phonology, morphology and vocabulary.

Its unique features distinguishes it from Eastern Assamese, there may some commonalities—case endings, conjugational affixes, pronominal roots, derivatives and vocabulary—that underscore a fundamental unity, nonetheless, Kamrupi dialect, with a long history of its own differs greatly from the eastern variety of Assamese.

Dr. Nirmalendu Bhowmik, while discussing similarity of Kamrupi with Eastern Assamese, observes that despite some similarity in morphology, there is absolutely no similarity in terms of phonology, though both languages shares few common words.

=== Comparison with other Eastern Indo-Aryan languages ===
Eastern Indo-Aryan languages share a common phonological structure.

Kamrupi	Sylheti	Standard Assamese	Translation
Xi ghorot/ghorok gesi	He Goro gese	Xi Ghoroloi/Ghorot goise	He has gone home.
Tai Ghorot gesi	Tai Goro gese	Tai Ghoroloi/Ghorot goise	She has gone home.
Eta Kamot aihlu/aisu	Exta xamo aisi	Eta Kamot Ahilû/Ahisû	I have come for some work.
Deksa na?	Dexso ni?	Dekhisa ne?	Have you seen it?
Zaba na tumi?	Zaibay ni tumi?	Zaba ne tumi?	Will you leave?

=== Glossarial ===
There is differences in vocables of Kamrupi and Eastern Assamese, such that even common objects are denoted by different words. In eastern variety there are no generic terms to such English words like brothers and sisters, Kamrupi do have, such as bhak and bainak. Kamrupi also uses /soli/ for both boys and girls collectively for children, East Assamese lacks such forms.

Kamrupi	Sylheti	Standard Assamese	Translation
Khüam	Xauaimu	Khüam	I will Feed (Someone)
Kumra	Kumṛa	Kümüra	Gourd
Mekur/Meukri	Mekur/Bilai	Mekuri	Cat
Hosa	Hasa	Xosa/Hosa	Truth
Dhól	Ḍul	Dhül	Drum
Nun	Nun	Lün	Salt
Sana	Aulad/Sao/Hurutayn	Püali/Sona	Offspring
Dima	Ḍim/Enḍa/Boida	Koni/Dim	Egg
-gila/-gilak	-guin	-bilak	Plural suffix
Pani	Fani	Pani	Water
Taka, Toka	Texá	Toka	Money
Bazar	Bazár	Bozar	Market
Souk, Tiniali/Sairali	Souk	Tiniali/Sariali	Town square
Manhu	Manu/Manuš/Mainš	Manuh	People

=== Old Indo-Aryan words ===
Kamrupi retained many Old Indo-Aryan words.

Kamrupi	East Assamese	Sylheti	O.I.A	Translation
Theng	Theng	Teng	Tanga	Leg
Pek	Büka	Fex	Panka	Mud
Phen	Phen	Fen/Fena	Phena	Foam
Bor	Bor	Damand/Boʊr	Vara	Bridegroom
Bari	Bari	Után/Barí/Barígòr	Vatika	Enclosed ground with plantation
Soli	(Löra-süali)	Sabal/Sao	Challi	Offspring
Boni	Bhoni	Boni/Boin	Bhagini	Sister
Dima	Dim	Dim	Dimba	Egg
Kake	Kakoi	Xaxoi	Kanikattika	Comb
Niar	Nior	Nior	Nihara	Fog
Kurma	(Mitir)	(Kutum)/Gushti	Kutumbaka	Relative

== Definition of the region ==
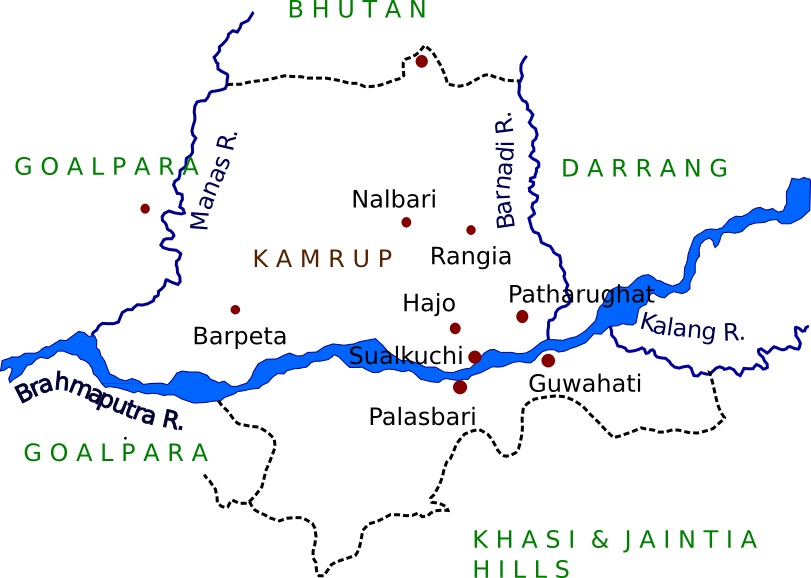
Kamrupi dialect speaking region in Assam

The Kamrup between Manas and Barnadi rivers, where Kamrupi is spoken, formed the capital area of two of three dynasties of the ancient Kamarupa kingdom (4th–12th century), with Pragjyotishpura (Guwahati) and Durjaya (North Guwahati). Kingdom existed as parallel to Davaka of central Assam. Absorption of Davaka by Kamrup marks eastward expansion of latter, which ultimately covered area from the Karatoya in the west to the temple of Dikkaravasini at Sadiya in the east, Bhutan in north and Northern Bangladesh in south.

=== Medieval ===
Mughals established four sarkars (administrative units): Bangalbhum, Dhekeri, Dakkhinkul and Kamrup; placing Kamrup in "Sarkar Kamrup". The Kamrupi is currently prevalent in Mughal Sarkar of Kamrup. In late medieval times, Kamrupi literary style passed to eastern Assam. The examples of medieval Assamese or middle Kamrupi are obtained from the 14th century from North Bengal, Western Assam and fewer in central Assam, and this was followed by a deluge of literary activity in the 16th century that accompanied the growth of Srimanta Sankardeva's Vaishnavite movement. The literary activities occurred throughout Assam and North Bengal, and influence of Kamrupi remain strong throughout.

Some features of Early and Middle Assamese which are still present in some dialects of Kamrupi Assamese and Central Assamese but absent in current Eastern Assamese (in italics):

- "manusya sahasrar madhyato kono janase punyabase gyanak lagi yatna kare ......emane durlabh jnano tumat krpaya kaho". (Katha Gita, 1593–1597)
- "āke śuni lakśminārāyane ghilāk khedi āhil. baṅɡāle khāibāk napāi gaṛar bhitarate śukhāi mare...tāhnār mukhat; āhnār sange (Kamrupar Buranji, 17th century)
- barphukane maharajat janova rup kari sihatar manuhak maharajar thaik anai...sidikir parā (Tripura Buranji, 18th century)

=== Colonial ===
Kamrup passed to the British in 1824, and the colonial district, largely congruous to the Kamapitha and Mughal Sarkar became the Undivided Kamrup district in the post-colonial period. Form spoken in Eastern Assam, come to notice due to translation of Bible in 1838 by American Baptist Missions, as part of conversion process. British adopted Eastern Assamese as the standard official language in 1873, due to recommendations of Christian missionaries. Whereas the Kamrupi was non-uniform, the eastern dialect was uniform over a large territory in eastern Assam. Nevertheless, Kamrupi pandits like Shyamal Choudhury, Amrit Bhushan Adhikary and Kaliram Medhi objected the imposition of eastern Assamese as official language of entire valley, especially in Kamrup due to distinctness and antiquity of Kamrupi language.

=== Modern ===
Since the center of literary activity has moved back to Guwahati in Kamrup, the standard based on eastern dialects has started acquiring Kamrupi dialectal elements in recent decades. For example, the instrumental case is -di in Kamrupi (hatedi, "with hand") and -re in eastern Assamese (hatere), and the Kamrupi form is increasingly common in the Standard.

These dialects are now spoken in the present districts of Kamrup Rural, western part of Kamrup Metropolitan, Nalbari, Barpeta, Darrang, and parts of Goalpara, Udalguri and Chirang. The name is derived from the colonial Kamrup district, from Kamarupa kingdom.

== Scholarly views ==
Magadhi Prakrit, keeping north of the Ganga river, gave rise to the Kamarupa Apabhramsa dialects of Assam and North Bengal. Suniti Kumar Chatterji divides Magadhan dialects regionwise as Radha, Varendra, Kamarupa and Vanga

Sukumar Sen referring to ancientness of Kamrupi, wrote, "Assamese, or more appropriately the old Kamarupi dialect entered into Kamrup or western Assam, where this speech was first characterized as Assamese."

Upendranath Goswami wrote, "The Assamese language, coming from the west was first characterized in Kamrup or Western Assam whose boundary comprised in early times the whole of North-Bengal, including Cooch-Behar, Rangpur and Jalpaiguri districts of Bengal".

== Literature ==
Charyapada

The early examples of Kamrupi writings and literature are copper plate seals of Kamrupi kings, issued in different parts of eastern and Northern India and the Charyapada, which is a collection of 8th-12th century Vajrayana Buddhist caryagiti, or mystical poems. Being caryagiti (songs of realization), the Charyapada were intended to be sung. These songs of realization were spontaneously composed verses, that expressed a practitioner's experience of the enlightened state. A manuscript of this anthology was discovered in the early 20th century, by Hariprasad Shastri in Nepal. It provides the examples of the Kamrupi and other eastern Indo-Aryan languages.

The writers of the Charyapada, the Mahasiddhas or Siddhacharyas, belonged to the various regions of Kamrup (Assam), Gauda (Bengal), Kalinga (Orissa) and Mithila (Bihar). A Tibetan translation of the Charyapada was also preserved in the Tibetan Buddhist canon.

The notable medieval Kamrupi literary figures are Rama Saraswati, Ananta Kandali, Sridhara Kandali, Sarvabhauma Bhattacharya, Kalapachandra Dvija and Bhattadeva, the father of Assamese prose. Hema Saraswati and Haribara Vipra are two other well known Kamrupi poets. Hema Saraswati composed the "Prahlad Charitra" based on the Vamana Purana, while Haribara Vipra translated the Aswamedha Parva of the Mahabharata. Kaviratna was the author of the "Jayadratha Vadha". His home was at Sila, a village within the Barpeta district. The writings of all these three poets are still extant. To a somewhat later period belonged Madhava Kandali and Rudra Kandali. The former versified portions of the Ramayana and the latter composed, in Kamrupi verse, portions of the Mahabharata.

Sankara Deva who was born in 1449 A.D., refers to Madhava Kandali as one of the reputed poets belonging to an earlier age. It may therefore place both Madhava Kandali and Rudra Kandali towards the end of the fourteenth century. In his Ramayana, Madhava Kandali himself states that his other name was Kaviraj-Kandali and that though he could easily compose verses in Sanskrit he composed the Ramayana in Assamese verse for the benefit of the people at large. Madhava Kandali wrote also another poem entitled "Devajit." Sixteenth century, witnessed a great development of the vernacular literature of Kamarupa. The Yogini Tantra, a well-known Sanskrit work which gives the boundaries of the kingdom of Kamarupa, as it existed during the rule of the Pala kings, probably written in Kamarupa during the first pact of the sixteenth century. To this period it must also assign the compilation of the Behula Upakhyana by Durgabar Kayastha, a native of Kamakhya.

== See also ==
- Kamrup (disambiguation)
- Kamrupi (disambiguation)
