= Dighalipukhuri =

Man-made pond located in Assam, India

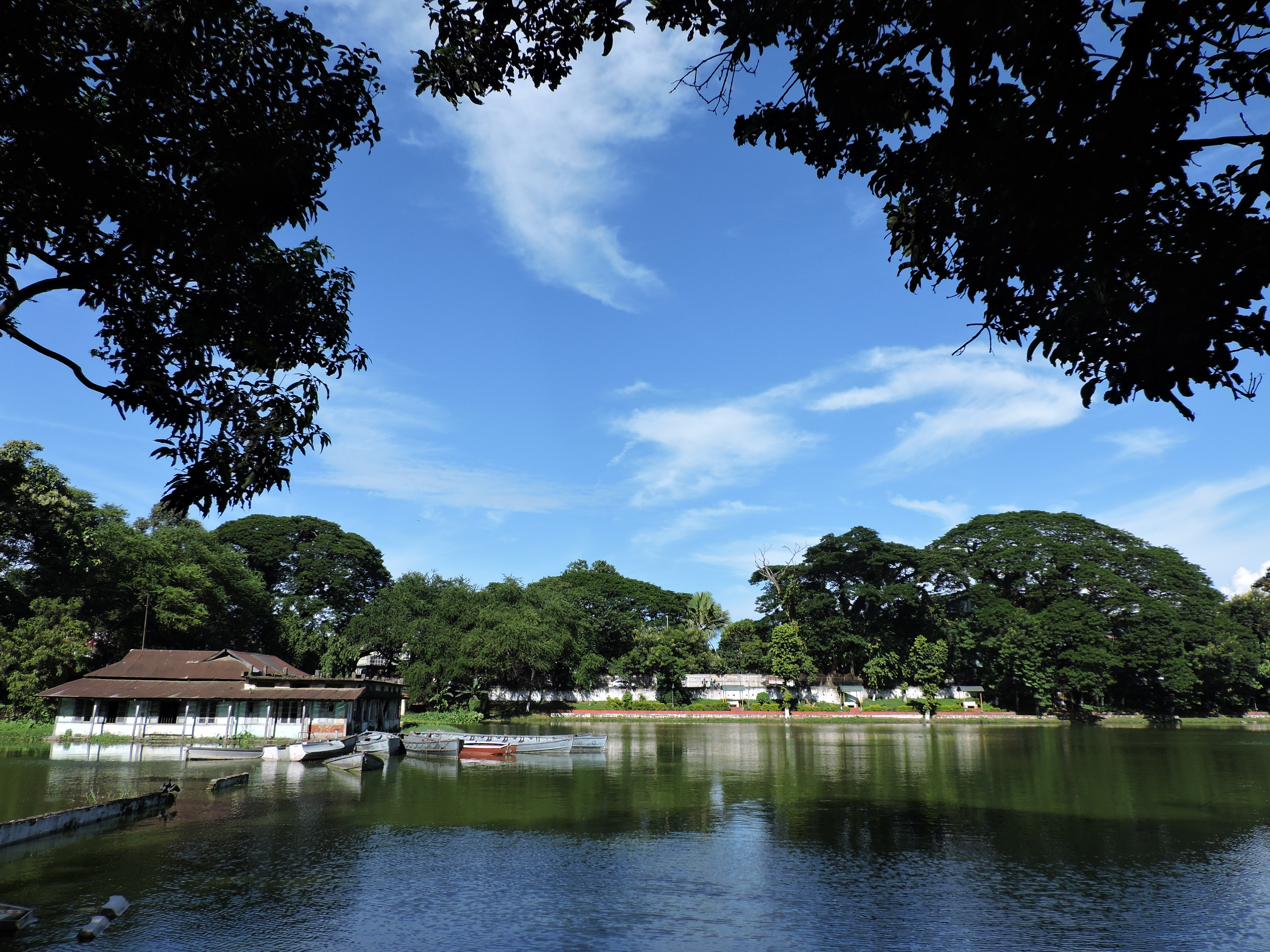
- View of Dighalipukhuri
- Interactive map of Dighalipukhuri
- Location: Assam
- Coordinates: 26.188°N 91.751°E
- Type: Pond
- Basin countries: India
- Settlements: Guwahati

Dighalipukhuri; also Dighalipukhri is a rectangular man-made pond in Guwahati, Assam, India, about half a mile long. Dighalipukhuri is occupied altogether area of garden and pond between 17-18 bigha lands.

== Legend ==
As per the legend constructed in the 16th or 17th century Yogini Tantra, its creation is credited to King Bhagadatta, who led the Kauravas in the Battle of Kurukshetra during the Mahabharata. The tank was dug by him during the svayamvara of his daughter, Bhanumati.

== History ==
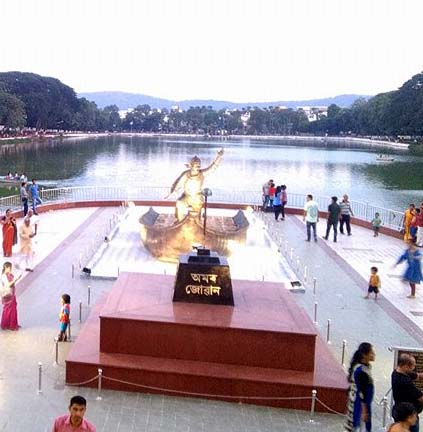
Assam's CM has inaugurated the war memorial on the north bank of Dighalipukhuri tank on 15 August 2016.

It was used by the Ahoms as a naval dockyard. Its access to the Brahmaputra was eventually closed, and during colonial times, that portion was further filled on which the Circuit House was built.

Later, the Gauhati High Court building was built in the newly filled area.

== Dighalipukhuri Park Timing ==
The Dighali Pukhuri Park opens at 8:30 AM and closes at 5.30 PM.

== Bibliography ==
- Al-Ahmed, Saikh Md Sabah, "A Tale of Four Ponds", The Assam Tribune, Guwahati, archived from the original on 19 January 2012
