= Kanaklal Barua =

Politician, writer

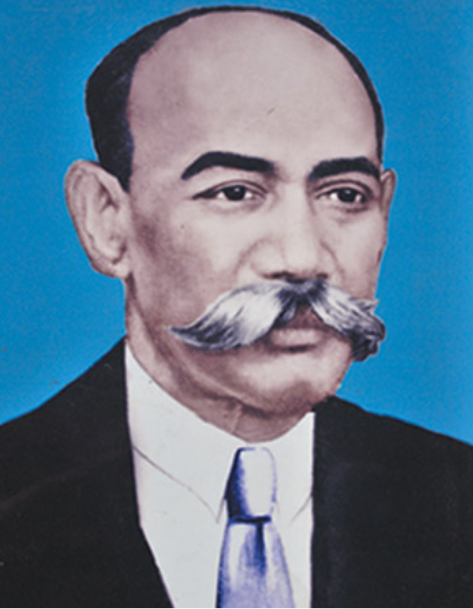
- Born: 1872; Assam, India
- Died: 18 January 1940 (aged 67–68)
- Occupations: Writer; essayist; historian; politician
- Writing career
- Language: Assamese

Kanaklal Barua (1872–1940) was a prominent writer, essayist, historian and politician from Assam who wrote mainly in the English language. He was one of the literary stalwarts of the Jonaki Era, the age of romanticism of Assamese literature. He was the president of the Asam Sahitya Sabha in 1924 held at Dibrugarh district, Assam. In 1929 he was elected to Assam Legislative Assembly. He also served as a member of the Viceroy's Executive Council. He was the founder president of the Kamarupa Anusandhan Samiti (Assam Research Society). He was rewarded with the "Raibahadur" title by the British Government.

== Works ==
His books include Studies in the Early History of Assam, An Early History of Kamarupa From the Earliest Time to the Sixteenth Century and Manual of Co-operative Societies in Assam. He was also an editor of the Jonaki magazine for some months.

== See also ==
- Assamese literature
- History of Assamese literature
- List of Asam Sahitya Sabha presidents
- List of Assamese writers with their pen names
