= Undivided Kamrup district =

Former administrative district in Assam

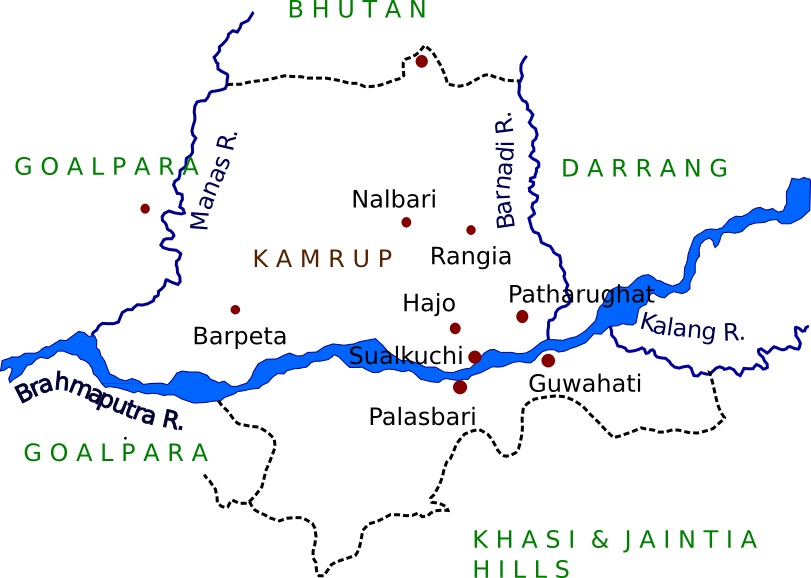
The Undivided Kamrup district in 1931

Undivided Kamrup district is a former administrative district located in Western Assam from which Kamrup Rural (2003), Kamrup Metropolitan (2003), Barpeta (1983), Nalbari (1985) and Baksa (2004) districts were formed. It was announced in January 2020 that the Bajali sub-division of Barpeta district will be upgraded to a full district.

== Establishment ==
=== Pre-Independence ===
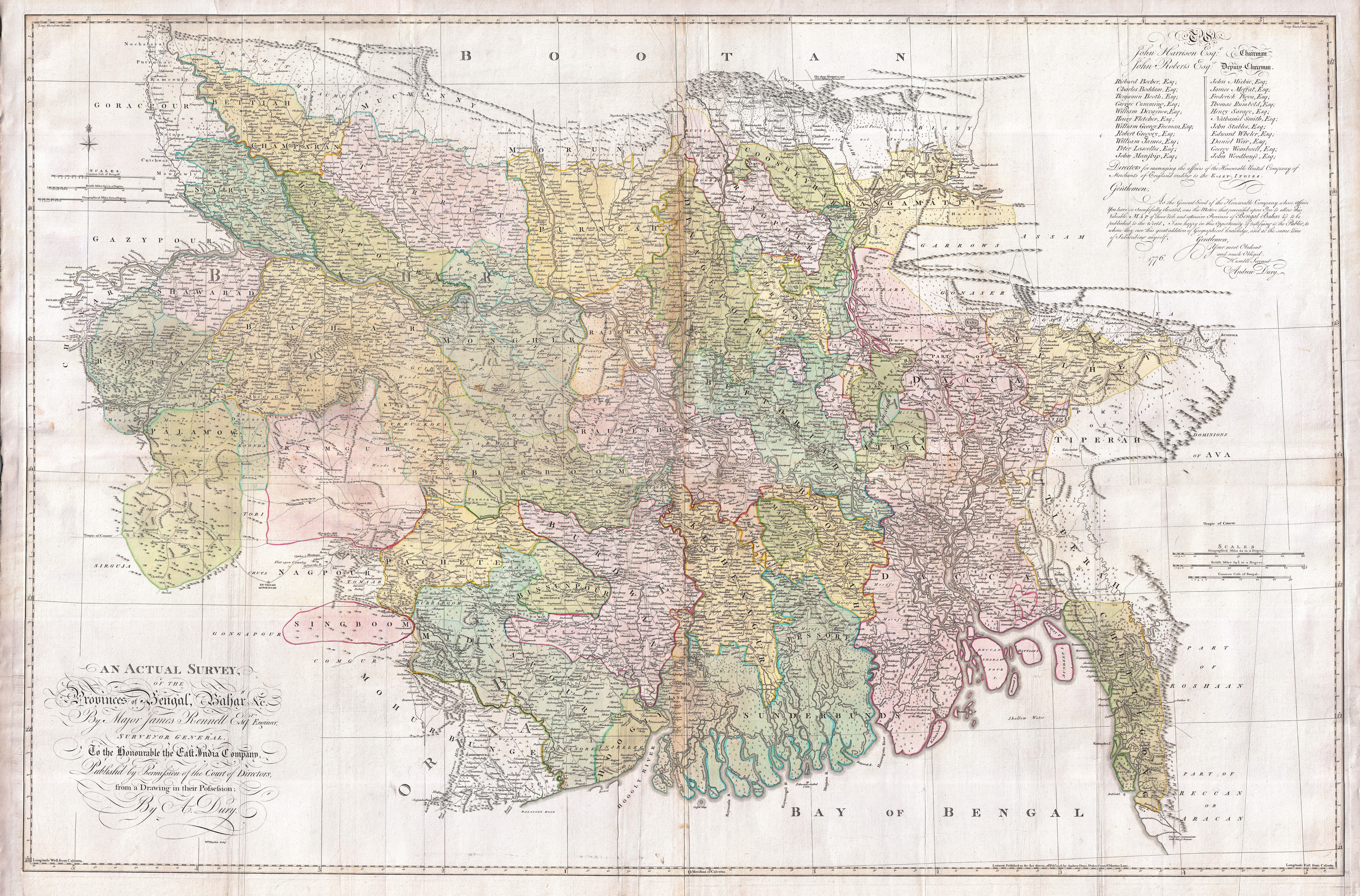
James Rennell's 1776 map shows the eastern boundary of the British controlled regions before 1824

The administrative district of Kamrup was first constituted from the western portion of the Ahom kingdom then under the Burmese Empire that the British acquired following the Treaty of Yandaboo of 1826. The western boundary of this district was the Manas River, and the eastern boundary of this district was the Barnadi river. After 1826 the British administered the newly acquired regions via two commissioners: the Senior Commissioner who administered the "North-East of Rangpur" (largely the undivided Goalpara) in addition to the newly acquired region between Manas river and Biswanath; and the Junior Commissioner, who administered the region to the east of Biswanath. In March 1833 the British established district administration in the region west of the Dhansiri river, with the Kamrup district originally envisaged as two separate districts among 3 others: the six parganas largely co-terminus with present-day Barpeta and Nagarberra; and the twenty parganas in the north and six duars in the south. Each district were to be administered by a Principal Assistant, deputed by a Junior Assistant. But due to a paucity of funds, the six pargana region had only a Junior Assistant, and by 1836, the Kamrup district acquired its "undivided" form and name.

=== Post-Independence ===
The district retained its colonial administrative structure post Independence of India in 1947. In 1983 Barpeta district was split from Kamrup. Nalbari district was then similarly split off on 14 August 1985. On 3 February 2003 Kamrup Metropolitan district was formed to cover the urban core of the district, and 1 June 2004 saw the formation of Baksa district which was formed from parts of three districts—Barpeta, Nalbari and Kamrup districts. The headquarters of both Kamrup Metropolitan and Kamrup districts is at Guwahati.

== History ==
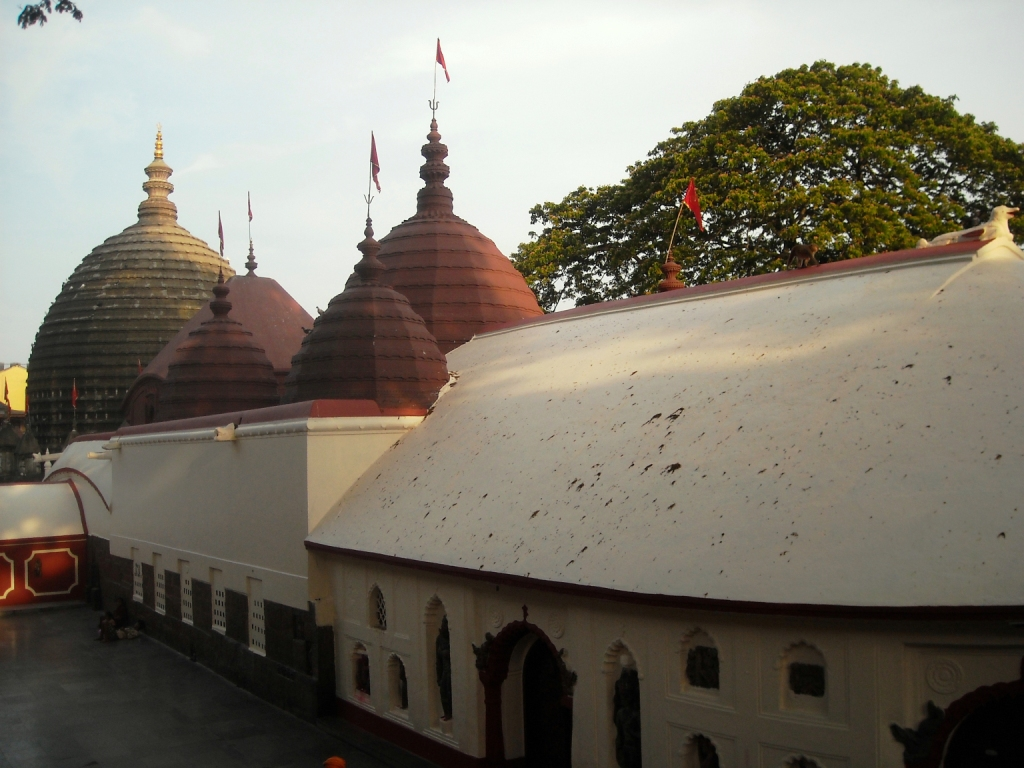
Ancient scriptures often refer Kamakhya temple as heart of Kamrup

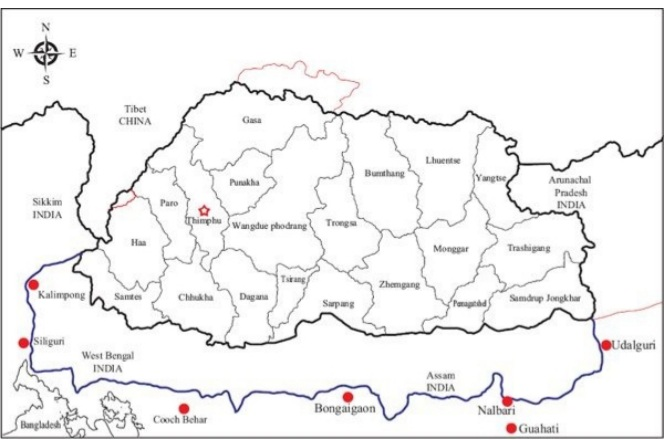
A major portion of undivided Kamrup region was under the Kingdom of Bhutan before the Duar War of 1865

Guwahati, the headquarters of Undivided Kamrup district, was the political center of two of the three Kamarupa dynasties. After the breakup of the Kamarupa kingdom, the region faced several invasions by the rulers of Bengal. Soon after the invasion of Malik Ikhtiyaruddin Iuzbak in 1257 CE, Sandhya, a Kamarupa ruler, moved his capital to North Bengal and established the Kamata kingdom; but its control of the region that later came to be Undivided Kamrup district was lax. This region thus stopped being a political center till the capital of Assam was moved in the 20th century from Shillong to Dispur.

== Population ==
#	District	Hindu Population	Hindu%	Muslim population	Muslim%	Total Population
1	Baksa	782,901	82.4%	135,750	14.29%	950,075
2	Barpeta	492,966	29.11%	1,198,036	70.74%	1,693,622
3	Kamrup	877,495	57.82%	601,784	39.66%	1,517,542
4	Kamrup Metropolitan	1,064,412	84.89%	151,071	12.05%	1,253,938
5	Nalbari	491,582	63.71%	277,488	35.96%	771,639
	Undivided Kamrup District (Total)	3,709,356	59.96%	2,364,129	38.21%	6,186,816

== See also ==
- Kamrup (disambiguation)
- Kamrupi
