= Kamapitha =

One of the four Kamarupa Pithas, the geographical divisions of ancient Kamarupa

The extent of Kamapitha according to different authors.

Kamapitha is one of the four Kamarupa Pithas, the geographical divisions of ancient Kamarupa. Dineshchandra Sircar points out that these divisions are not found in the Kamarupa inscriptions and that they might be fabrications from late medieval sources, such as 16th-century work Yogini Tantra gives the boundaries of Kamapitha and other three pithas, the same work which gives boundaries of ancient Kamrup kingdom as well. The eastern border of Kamarupa was the temple of the goddess Tamreshvari (Pūrvāte Kāmarūpasya devī Dikkaravasini, given in the 10th-century Kalika Purana) near present-day Sadiya

== Boundaries ==
Traditional sources defines boundaries of Kamapitha as area between Manas river and Silghat, Sankosh and Kapili river, based on ancient work Yogini Tantra, areas comprising western boundary of current Kamrup and part of Nagaon district as eastern boundary, in first case, while in second case, Undivided Kamrup plus small part of Undivided Goalpara District.

Modern scholarship, considering change in course of rivers, gives Kamapitha area as Guwahati area up to the Manas River, which is Kamrup, as Kamapitha. Pratap Chandra Choudhury, has no difficulty in accepting that Kamapitha of Tantras, is nothing else than Kamrup and Kamakhya area of Guwahati itself. Kamarupa Anusandhan Samiti, also presses that it is rather absurd, to exclude Kamakhya from the region called Kamapitha.

Source	Western	Eastern	Current regions	Reference
Yogini-tantra	Karatoya	Sankosh	North Bengal	Gait 1906, pp10–11, Sircar 1990, p68
-	Manas	Silghat	Kamrup, parts of Darrang	Sircar 1990, p68
Kamrupar Buranji	Sankosh	Duimunisila	Parts of Goalpara, Kamrup and parts of Nagaon	Bhuyan 1930, p1
Hara-gauri-samvada	Sankosh	Kapili	Parts of Goalpara, Kamrup and parts of Nagaon	Kakati 1967, p7
Vrihadgavakashtantra	Manas	Biswanath	Kamrup and Darrang	KAS 1985, p100
R M Nath	Manas	Guwahati	Kamrup	Goswami 1998, p25
R M Nath	Manas	Rupahi	Kamrup	Nath 1978, p4

== Shakta pitha ==
It form the waist on the position of the genital organ (kama), justifying its name. Kamapitha also known as Kamrup, is important Shakta pitha and pilgrimage center, due to presence of ancient Kamakhya Temple, relating to legends of goddess Kamakhya. Kamapitha is heart of ancient Kamrup, with presence of two major capitals out of three namely Pragjyotishpura and Durjaya.

== Deities ==
It is believed that, each pitha of Kamrup is in charge of respective deities. Kamakhya is said to be the deity, which governs Kamapitha, whereas Jalpisa looks after Ratnapitha while Dikkarvasini takes charge of Saumarpitha.

== See also ==
- Kamarupa
