= Saumarapitha =

Saumarapitha is one of the four Kamarupa Pithas, the geographical divisions of ancient Kamarupa.

== Boundaries ==
Sources defines boundaries of Saumarapitha as area between from the Bhairavi and the Dikarai river.

== See also ==
- Swarnapitha
- Ratnapitha
