= Swarnapitha =

Swarnapitha is one of the four Kamarupa Pithas, the geographical divisions of ancient Kamarupa.

== Boundaries ==
Sources define the boundaries of Swarnapitha as the area between the Rupali River and the Bharali River.

== See also ==
- Kamapitha
- Ratnapitha
