= Kamarupa pithas =

Geographical divisions

Kamarupa Pithas are ancient pithas or geographical divisions of Kamarupa. The division of the Pithas are not consistent in different sources, though the number of pithas are usually four. Since these pithas are not mentioned in the Kamarupa inscriptions, and are found mentioned only in later medieval texts some authors have suggested that these divisions are possible later fabrications. The Yogini Tantra (16th- 17th-century), mentions the Kamarupa Pithas, the same work which gives boundaries of ancient Kamrup kingdom as well.

== Number of Pithas ==
The number of pithas reported are usually four, though some sources mention just three.

The four Pithas were:

1. Ratnapitha, the area from the river Karatoya to the river Sonkosh,
2. Kamapitha, from Sonkosh to the river Rupali,
3. Swarnapitha, from the river Rupali to the Bharali river (Central Assam),
4. Saumarapitha between the Bhairavi and the Dikarai river (Eastern Assam).

According to the Kamrupar Buranji, the divisions were:

1. Ratnapitha from the Maurang kingdom to Sankosh river,
2. Kamapitha from Sankosh to Duimunisila,
3. Bhadrapitha from Kallang river to kailash river, and
4. Saumarpith from Duimunisila to Dikkaravasini.

D C Sircar provides three different versions:

- Kamapitha (Karatoya to Sankosh); Ratnapitha (Sankosh to Rupahi); Suvarnapitha (Rupahi to Bharali); and Saumarpitha (Bharali to Dibang near Sadiya).
- Ratnapitha (Karatoya to Manas); Kamapitha (from Manas to Silghat on the northbank of Brahmaputra); Bhadrapitha (south bank, south of Kamapitha); and Saumarpitha to the east.
- The boundary taken from the haragaurisamvada: Ratnapitha (Karatoya to Sankosh); Kamapitha (Sankosh to Kapili); Suvarnapitha (Rupika to Bhairavi); and Saumarpitha (Bhairavi to Dibang).

== Bibliography ==
- Gait, Edward A (1906), A History of Assam, Calcutta, ISBN 9780404168193
- Bhuyan, S. K. (1930). Bhuyan, S. K. (ed.). Kamrupar Buranji (in Assamese). Assam: Department of Historical and Antiquarian Studies.
- Shastri, Biswanarayan (1985). "Tantra: A Neglected Source for Materials for History of Assam". Journal of the Assam Research Society. 28: 94–104.
- Sircar, D C (1990), "Pragjyotisha-Kamarupa", in Barpujari, H K (ed.), The Comprehensive History of Assam, vol. I, Guwahati: Publication Board, Assam, pp. 59–78
