= Adhikari-bheda =

Adhikari-bheda is a Sanskrit expression composed of two words: adhikāri, meaning "the rightful" or "the qualified", and bheda, meaning "distinction" or "difference". It loosely refers to the distinction between qualified persons or to the differences among aspirants capable of apprehending the same truth. The principle of adhikāri-bheda, widely accepted within Hindu thought, forms the basis of the teachings of the Upanishads, the Brahma Sutras, and the Bhagavad Gita. These texts contain seemingly contradictory doctrines, intended for people at different stages of spiritual evolution. The principle is linked to the application of Arundhatī Darśana Nyāya.

Arundhatī Darśana Nyāya is the method of pointing out the faint star Arundhati with the help of brighter stars.

Hinduism encompasses various darshanas (philosophical systems). The conflicts among them are addressed through the twin doctrines of adhikāra and iṣṭa. Adhikāra refers to eligibility; it is not a gradation but an acceptance of realism in the spiritual sphere and is tied to duty. A person's faith is determined by their disposition, and their creed depends on their adhikāra, which in turn determines their iṣṭa or chosen ideal. Thus, adhikāri-bheda refers to differences in eligibility, which arise from differing perspectives. It provides a framework for recognising the validity of various experiences and doctrines.

In the Bhagavad Gita, Krishna urges Arjuna to follow his varna-dharma of fighting, rather than adopting the general duty (sādhāraṇa dharma) of non-violence. To achieve this, Krishna employs multiple philosophical and ethical arguments. The branches and sub-branches of Hindu philosophy and ethics, which are largely individualistic, are therefore grounded in spiritual competence or adhikāri-bheda. In this sense, adhikāri-bheda signifies the differences among persons who are qualified to follow certain procedures in order to discharge their respective duties.

This principle also permits upasana (devotional practice). Sankara, in line with this principle, replaced the binary of truth and error with concepts such as adequacy, inadequacy, and degrees of adequacy. He held that the Ultimate cannot be fully formulated, yet a formulation of it is not erroneous if it serves as a stepping stone towards higher understanding.

In Tantric yoga, adhikāri-bheda is regarded as an integral aspect of sādhanā. Since not all aspirants are capable of understanding, living or realising the highest ideal, a uniform discipline cannot be prescribed. Each individual must be gradually uplifted through a discipline suited to their temperament and capacity. Tantric tradition categorises seekers into three types: paśu (the animal type), vīra (the heroic type), and divya (the divine type). These correspond to stages of human evolution, recognising that not all can attain the highest spiritual aim within a single lifetime, though progress made in one birth carries over into the next.

Swami Vivekananda also invoked adhikāri-bheda in his rational defence of Hinduism, as it allowed individuals to choose their own creed and sect according to their temperament. The concept is also present in the Mahayoga and Yogini Tantras of Buddhism.

== Usage in defense of caste ==
The principle of adhikāri-bheda has also been interpreted to suggest that each caste and sect possesses its own rituals and beliefs, forming a unified but hierarchically differentiated structure in which each group understands its place.

Swami Vivekananda, however, argued that caste is an expression of an individual's nature. He condemned the notion of caste as a rigid hereditary structure, considering it a corruption of the original understanding of caste based on personal qualities and aptitude.
