= Yoni =

Aniconic representation of the Hindu goddess Shakti, consort of Shiva

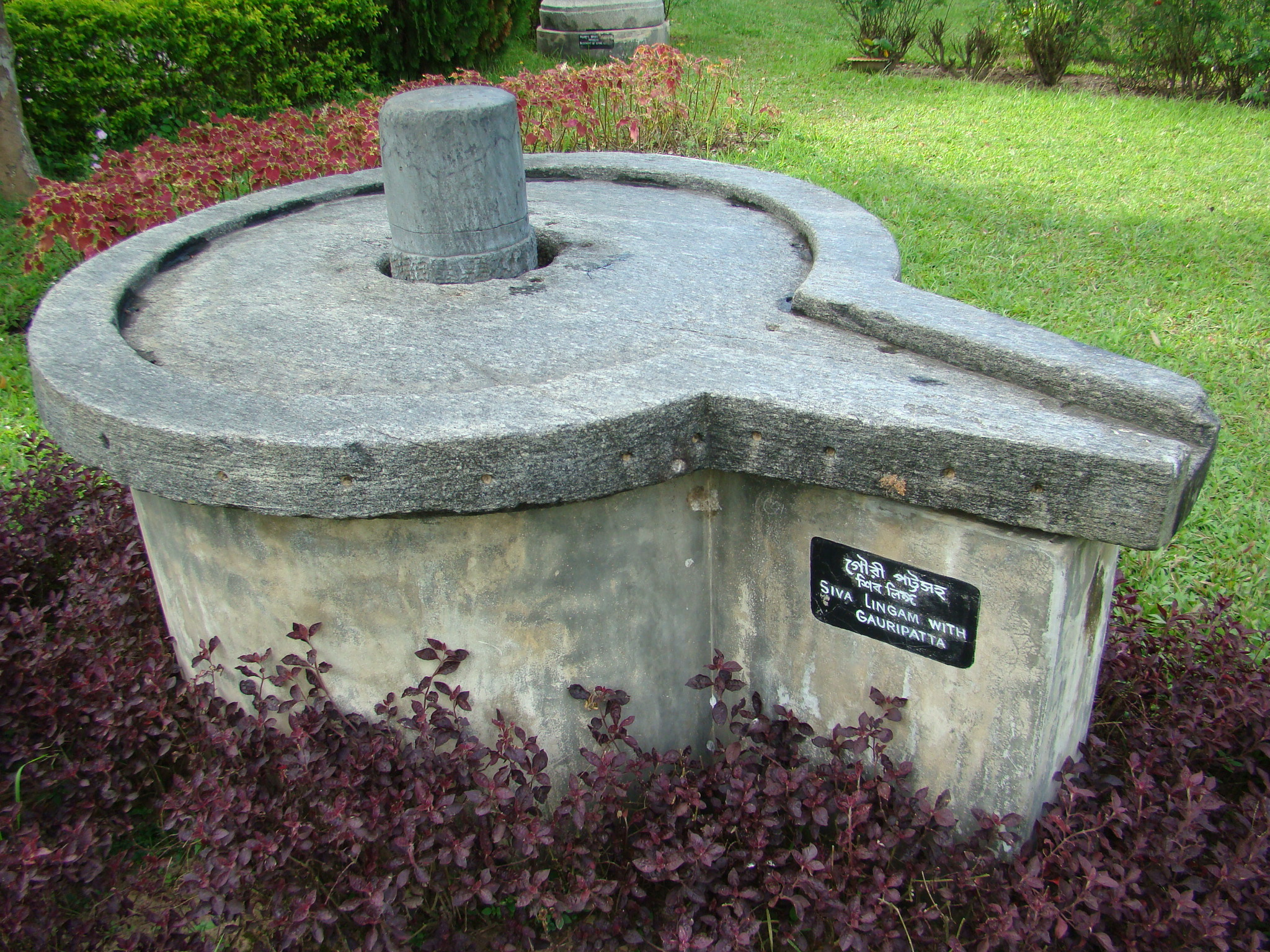
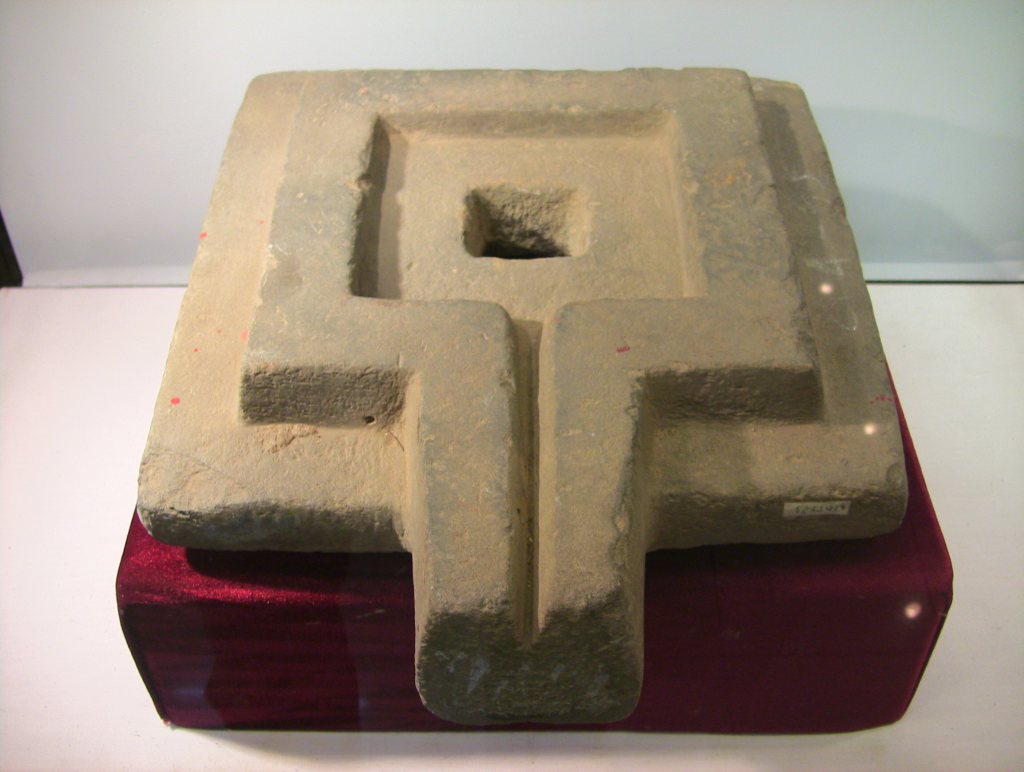
Yoni and lingam icons are found in both round and square base forms. Yoni is a symbol for the divine feminine procreative energy.

Yoni (Sanskrit: योनि, IAST: yoni), sometimes called pindika, is an abstract or aniconic representation of the Hindu goddess Shakti. It is usually shown with linga – its masculine counterpart. Together, they symbolize the merging of microcosmos and macrocosmos, the divine eternal process of creation and regeneration, and the union of the feminine and the masculine that recreates all of existence. The yoni is conceptualized as nature's gateway of all births, particularly in the esoteric Kaula and Tantra practices, as well as the Shaktism and Shaivism traditions of Hinduism.

Yoni is a Sanskrit word that has been interpreted to literally mean the "womb", the "source", and the female organs of generation. It also connotes the female sexual organs such as "vagina", "vulva", and "uterus", or alternatively to "origin, abode, or source" of anything in other contexts. For example, the Vedanta text Brahma Sutras metaphorically refers to the metaphysical concept Brahman as the "yoni of the universe". The yoni with linga iconography is found in Shiva temples and archaeological sites of the Indian subcontinent and southeast Asia, as well in sculptures such as the Lajja Gauri.

== Etymology and significance ==
Yoni appears in the Rigveda and other Vedic literature in the sense of feminine life-creating regenerative and reproductive organs, as well as in the sense of "source, origin, fountain, place of birth, womb, nest, abode, fire pit of incubation". Other contextual meanings of the term include "race, caste, family, fertility symbol, grain or seed". It is a spiritual metaphor and icon in Hinduism for the origin and the feminine regenerative powers in the nature of existence. The Brahma Sutras metaphorically calls the metaphysical concept Brahman as the "yoni of the universe", which Adi Shankara states in his commentaries means the material cause and "source of the universe".

According to Indologists Constance Jones and James D. Ryan, the yoni symbolizes the female principle in all life forms as well as the "earth's seasonal and vegetative cycles", and thus is an emblem of cosmological significance. The yoni is a metaphor for nature's gateway of all births, particularly in the Shaktism and Shaivism traditions of Hinduism, as well as the esoteric Kaula and Tantra sects. Yoni together with the lingam is a symbol for prakriti, its cyclic creation and dissolution. According to Corinne Dempsey – a professor of Religious Studies, yoni is an "aniconic form of the goddess" in Hinduism, the feminine principle Shakti.

The yoni is sometimes referred to as pindika. The base on which the linga-yoni sit is called the pitha, but in some texts such as the Nisvasa tattva samhita and Mohacudottara, the term pitha generically refers to the base and the yoni.

== History ==
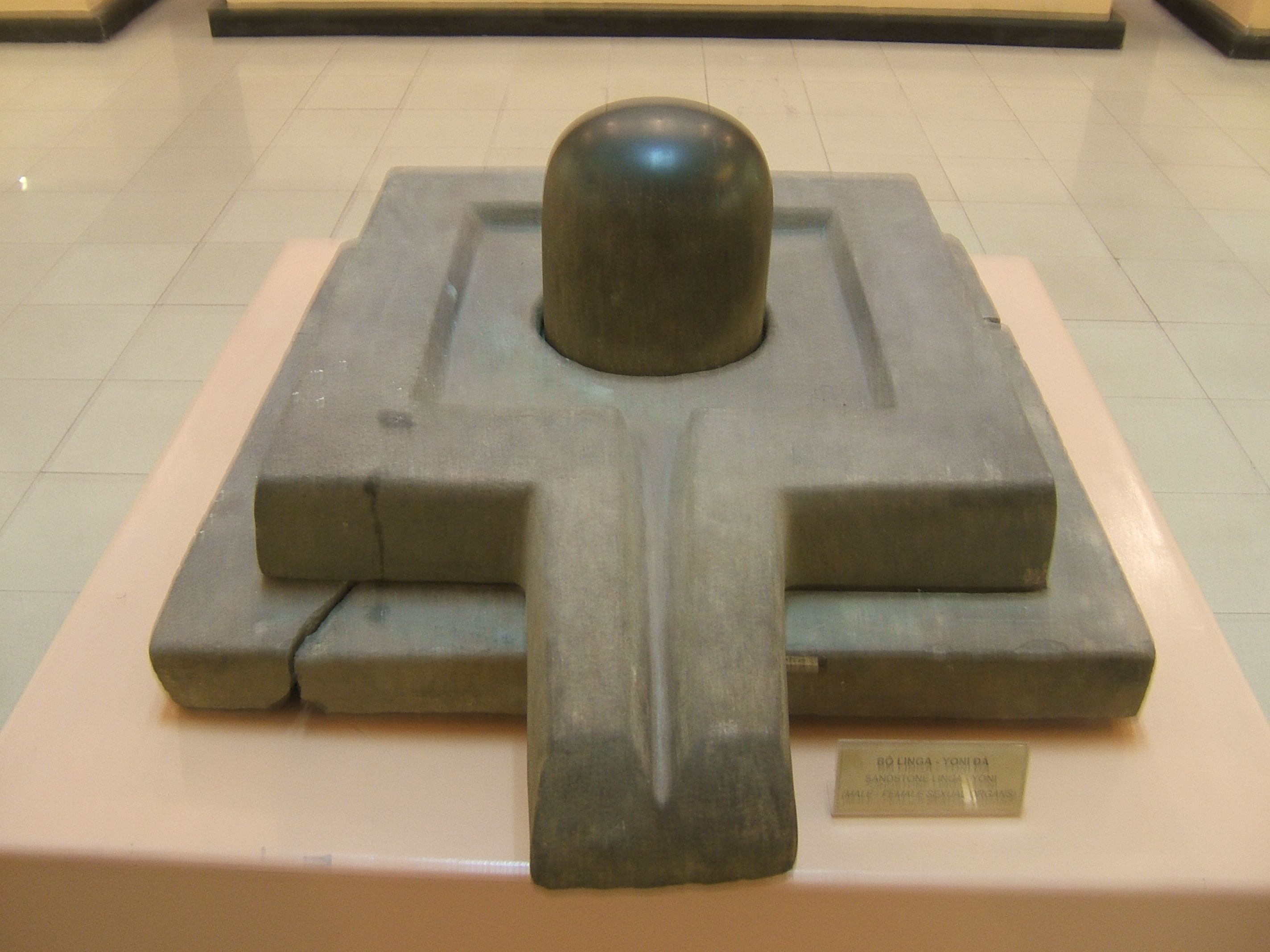
Lingam-yoni at the Cát Tiên sanctuary, Lâm Đồng province, Vietnam

The reverence for yoni, state Jones and Ryan, is probably pre-Vedic. Figurines recovered from Zhob valley and dated to the 4th millennium BCE show pronounced breasts and yoni, and these may have been fertility symbols used in prehistoric times that ultimately evolved into spiritual symbols. According to David Lemming, the yoni worship tradition dates to the pre-Vedic period, over the 4000 BCE to 1000 BCE period.

The yoni has served as a divine symbol from ancient times, and it may well be the oldest spiritual icon not only in India but across many ancient cultures. Some in the orthodox Western cultures, states the Indologist Laura Amazzone, have treated the feminine sexual organs and sexuality in general as a taboo subject, but in Indic religions and other ancient cultures the yoni has long been accepted as profound cosmological and philosophical truth, of the feminine potential and power, one mysteriously interconnected with the natural periodic cycles of moon, earth and existence.

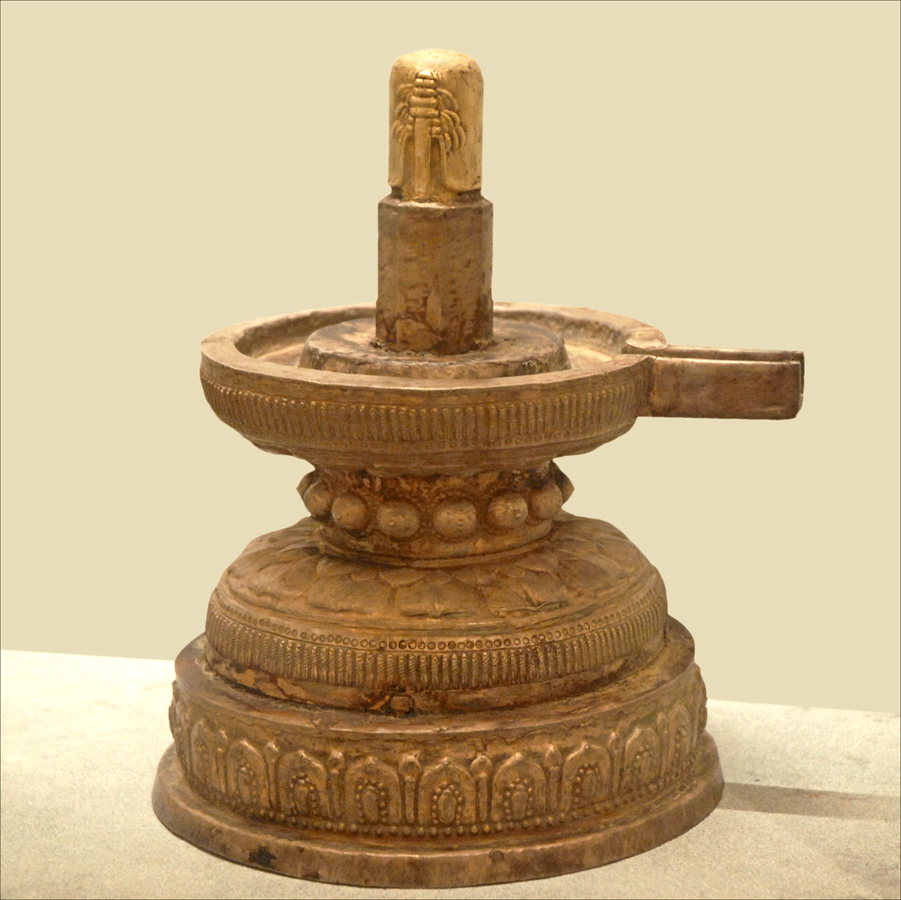
A jatalinga with yoni.

The yoni is considered to be an abstract representation of Shakti and Devi, the creative force that moves through the entire universe. In tantra, yoni is the origin of life.

=== Archaeology ===
The colonial era archaeologists John Marshall and Ernest Mackay proposed that certain polished stones with holes found at Harappan sites may be evidence of yoni-linga worship in Indus Valley civilisation. Scholars such as Arthur Llewellyn Basham dispute whether such artifacts discovered at the archaeological sites of Indus Valley sites are yoni. For example, Jones and Ryan state that lingam/yoni shapes have been recovered from the archaeological sites at Harappa and Mohenjo-daro, part of the Indus Valley civilisation. In contrast, Jane McIntosh states that truncated ring stones with holes were once considered as possibly yonis. Later discoveries at the Dholavira site, and further studies, have proven that these were pillar components because the "truncated ring stones with holes" are integral architectural components of the pillars. However, states McIntosh, the use of these structures in architecture does not rule out their simultaneous religious significance as yoni.

According to the Indologist Asko Parpola, "it is true that Marshall's and Mackay's hypotheses of linga and yoni worship by the Harappans has rested on rather slender grounds, and that for instance the interpretation of the so-called ring-stones as yonis seems untenable". He quotes Dales 1984 paper, which states "with the single exception of the unidentified photography of a realistic phallic object in Marshall's report, there is no archaeological evidence to support claims of special sexually-oriented aspects of Harappan religion". However, adds Parpola, a re-examination at Indus Valley sites suggest that the Mackay's hypothesis cannot be ruled out because erotic and sexual scenes such as ithyphallic males, naked females, a human couple having intercourse and trefoil imprints have now been identified at the Harappan sites. The "finely polished circular stand" found by Mackay may be yoni although it was found without the linga. The absence of linga, states Parpola, may be because it was made from wood which did not survive.

=== Sanskrit literature ===
The term yoni and its derivatives appear in ancient medicine and surgery-related Sanskrit texts such as the Sushruta Samhita and Charaka Samhita. In this context, yoni broadly refers to "female sexual and procreative organs". According to Indologists Rahul Das and Gerrit Meulenbeld known for their translations and reviews of ancient Sanskrit medical and other literature, yoni "usually denotes the vagina or the vulva, in a technical sense it also includes the uterus along with these; moreover, yoni- can at times mean simply 'womb, uterus' too, though it [Cakrapanidata's commentary on Sushruta Samhita] does so relatively seldom". According to Amit Rupapara et al., yoni-roga means "gynecological disorders" and yoni-varti means "vaginal suppository". The Charaka Samhita dedicates its 30th chapter in Chikitsa Sthana to yoni-vyapath or "gynecological disorders".

In sexuality-related Sanskrit literature, as well as Tantric literature, yoni connotes many layers of meanings. Its literal meaning is "female genitalia", but it also encompasses other meanings such as "womb, origin, and source". In some Indic literature, yoni means vagina, and other organs regarded as "divine symbol of sexual pleasure, the matrix of generation and the visible form of Shakti".

=== Orientalist literature ===
The colonial era Orientalists and Christian missionaries, raised in the Victorian mold where sex and sexual imagery were a taboo subject, were shocked by and were hostile to the yoni iconography and reverence they witnessed. The 19th and early 20th-century colonial and missionary literature described yoni, lingam-yoni, and related theology as obscene, corrupt, licentious, hyper-sexualized, puerile, impure, demonic and a culture that had become too feminine and dissolute. To the Hindus, particularly the Shaivites, these icons and ideas were the abstract, a symbol of the entirety of creation and spirituality. The colonial disparagement in part triggered the opposite reaction from Bengali nationalists, who more explicitly valorised the feminine. Swami Vivekananda called for the revival of the Mother Goddess as a feminine force, inviting his countrymen to "proclaim her to all the world with the voice of peace and benediction".

According to Wendy Doniger, the terms lingam and yoni became explicitly associated with human sexual organs in the western imagination after the widely popular first Kama Sutra translation by Sir Richard Burton in 1883. In his translation, even though the original Sanskrit text does not use the words lingam or yoni for sexual organs, Burton adroitly sidestepped being viewed as obscene to the Victorian mindset by using them throughout in place of words such as penis, vulva, and vagina to discuss sex, sexual relationships and human sexual positions. This conscious and incorrect word substitution, states Doniger, thus served as an Orientalist means to "anthropologize sex, distance it, make it safe for English readers by assuring them, or pretending to assure them, that the text was not about real sexual organs, their sexual organs, but merely about the appendages of weird, dark people far away." Similar Orientalist literature of the Christian missionaries and the British era, states Doniger, stripped all spiritual meanings and insisted on the Victorian vulgar interpretation only, which had "a negative effect on the self-perception that Hindus had of their own bodies" and they became "ashamed of the more sensual aspects of their own religious literature". Some contemporary Hindus, states Doniger, in their passion to spiritualize Hinduism and for their Hindutva campaign have sought to sanitize the historic earthly sexual meanings, and insist on the abstract spiritual meaning only.

== Iconography and temples ==
Within Shaivism, the sect dedicated to the god Shiva, the Shakti is his consort and both have aniconic representations: lingam for Shiva, yoni for Shakti. The yoni iconography is typically represented in the form of a horizontally placed round or square base with a lipped edge and an opening in the center usually with a cylindrical lingam. Often, one side of this base extends laterally, and this projection is called the yoni-mukha. An alternate symbol for yoni that is commonly found in Indic arts is the lotus, an icon found in temples.

The yoni is one of the sacred icons of the Hindu Shaktism tradition, with historic arts and temples dedicated to it. Some significant artworks related to yoni include the Lajja Gauri found in many parts of India and the Kamakhya Temple in Assam. Both of these have been dated to the late 1st millennium CE, with the major expansion of the Kamakhya temple that added a new sanctum above the natural rock yoni attached to an older temple being dated to the 16th-century Koch dynasty period.

=== Lajja Gauri ===
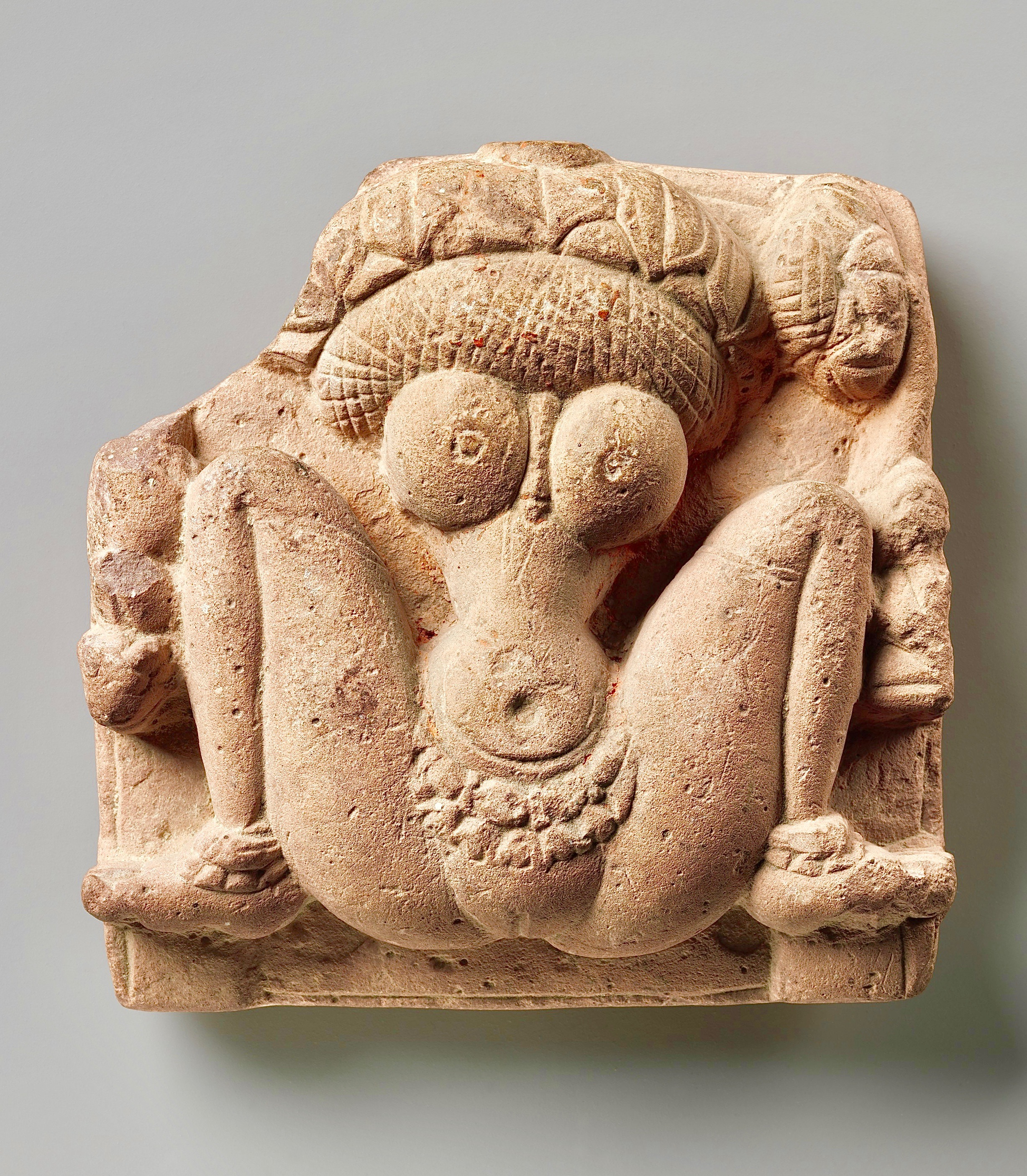
6th-century Lajja Gauri icon from Madhya Pradesh. In this and other early icons, her head is symbolically substituted with a large lotus-flower, her yoni visible in the depicted splayed position as if she is giving birth.

The Lajja Gauri is an ancient icon that is found in many Devi-related temples across India and one that has been unearthed at several archaeological sites in South Asia. The icon represents yoni but with more context and complexity. According to the Art Historian Carol Bolon, the Lajja Gauri icon evolved over time with increasing complexity and richness. It is a fertility icon and symbolizes the procreative and regenerative powers of mother earth, "the elemental source of all life, animal and plant", the vivifier and "the support of all life". The earliest representations were variants of aniconic pot, the second stage represented it as the three-dimensional artwork with no face or hands but a lotus-head that included yoni, chronologically followed by the third stage that added breasts and arms to the lotus-headed figure. The last stage was an anthropomorphic figure of a squatting naked goddess holding lotus and motifs of agricultural abundance spread out showing her yoni as if she is giving birth or sexually ready to procreate. According to Bolon, the different aniconic and anthropomorphic representations of Lajja Gauri are symbols for the "yoni of Prithvi (Earth)", she as womb.

The Lajja Gauri iconography – sometimes referred to by other names such as Yellamma or Ellamma – has been discovered in many South Indian sites such as the Aihole (4th to 12th-century), Nagarjunakonda (4th century Lajja Gauri inscription and artwork), Balligavi, Elephanta Caves, Ellora Caves, many sites in Gujarat (6th century), central India such as Nagpur, northern parts of the subcontinent such as Bhaktapur (Nepal), Kausambi and many other sites.

=== Kamakhya Temple ===
The Kamakhya temple is one of the oldest shakta pithas in South Asia or sacred pilgrimage sites of the Shaktism tradition. Textual, inscriptional and archaeological evidence suggests that the temple has been revered in the Shaktism tradition continuously since at least the 8th-century CE, as well as the related esoteric tantric worship traditions. The Shakta tradition believes, states Hugh Urban – a professor of Religious Studies primarily focusing on South Asia, that this temple site is the "locus of goddess' own yoni".

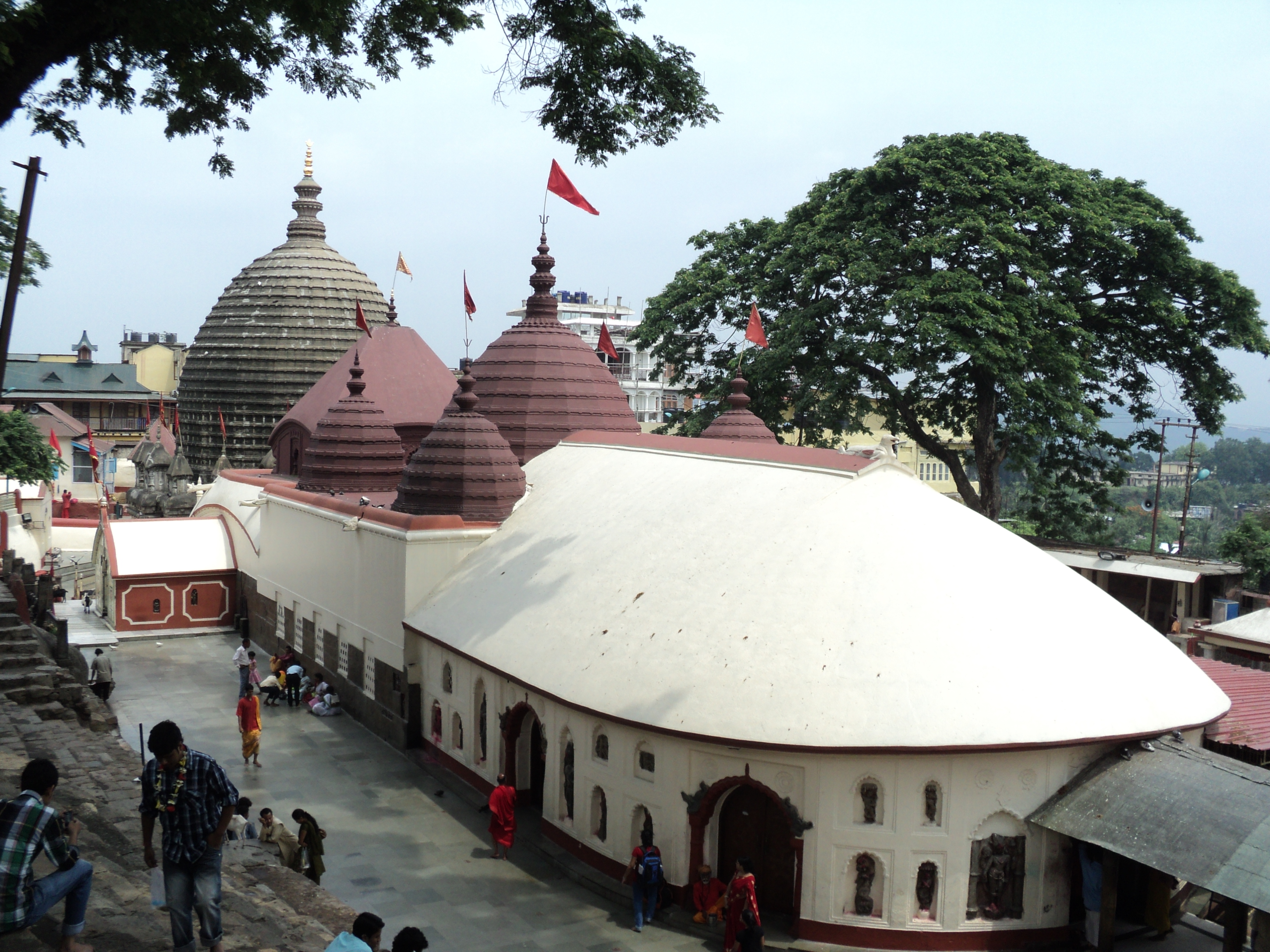
8th-century Kamakhya Temple, Guwahati, Assam: its sanctum has no murti, but houses a rock with a yoni-shaped fissure with a natural water spring. It is a major Shaktism-tradition pilgrimage site.

The regional tantric tradition considers this yoni site as the "birthplace" or "principal center" of tantra. While the temple premises, walls and mandapas have numerous depictions of goddess Kamakhya in her various roles, include those relating to her procreative powers, as a martial warrior, and as a nurturing motherly figure (one image near the western gate shows her nursing a baby with her breast, dated to 10th-12th century). The temple sanctum, however, has no idols. The sanctum features a yoni-shaped natural rock with a fissure and a natural water spring flowing over it. The Kamakhya yoni is linked to the Shiva-Sati legend, both mentioned in the early puranic literature related to Shaktism such as the Kalika Purana.

Every year, about the start of monsoons, the natural spring turns red because of iron oxide and sindoor (red pigment) anointed by the devotees and temple priests. This is celebrated as a symbol of the menstruating goddess, and as the Ambubachi Mela (also known as Ambuvaci or ameti), an annual fertility festival held in June. During Ambubachi, a symbolic annual menstruation course of the goddess Kamakhya is worshipped in the Kamakhya Temple. The temple stays closed for three days and then reopens to receive pilgrims and worshippers. The sanctum with the yoni of the goddess is one of the most important pilgrimage sites for the Shakti tradition, attracting between 70,000 and 200,000 pilgrims during the Ambubachi Mela alone from the northeastern and eastern states of India such as West Bengal, Bihar and Uttar Pradesh. It also attracts yogis, tantrikas, sadhus, aghoris as well as other monks and nuns from all over India.

=== Yantra ===
In esoteric traditions such as tantra, particularly the Sri Chakra tradition, the main icon (yantra) has nine interlocking triangles. Five of these point downwards and these are consider symbols of yoni, while four point upwards and these are symbols of linga. The interlocking represents the interdependent union of the feminine and masculine energies for the creation and destruction of existence.

=== Southeast Asia ===
Yoni typically with linga is found in historic stone temples and panel reliefs of Indonesia, Vietnam, Cambodia, and Thailand. In Cham literature, yoni is sometimes referred to as Awar, while the linga is referred to as Ahier.

== Other uses ==
Yoni mudra used in Yoga practice.

- Yoni mudra is a modern gesture in meditation used to reduce distraction during the beginning of yoga practice.
- In the Thai language the medial canthus (the sharp corner of the eye closest to the nose) is called "Yoni Tha" where "Tha" means the eye.

== See also ==
- Sheela na gig
