= Ambubachi Mela =

Annual Hindu mela (gathering) held at Kamakhya Temple in Guwahati, Assam

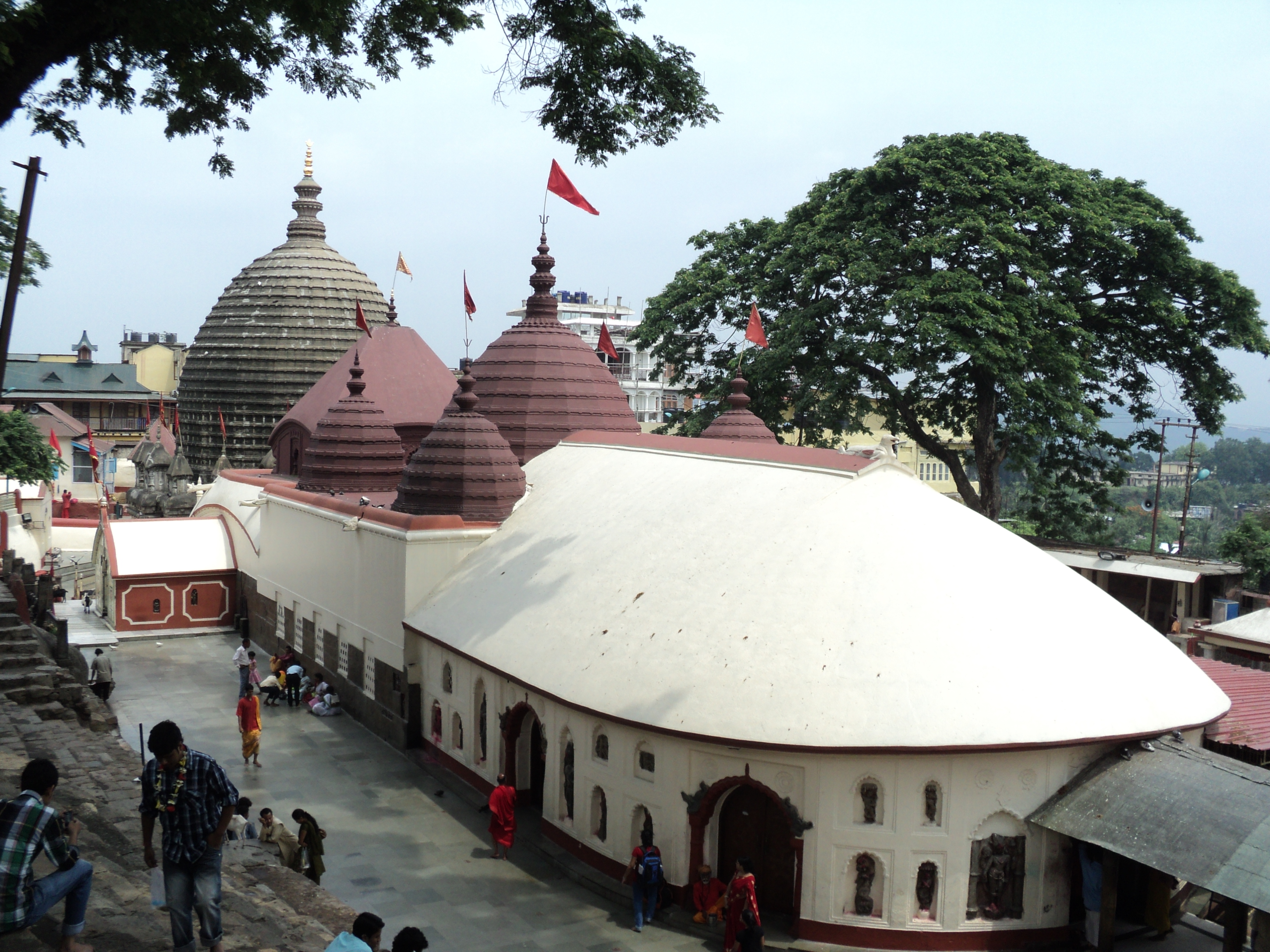
- Kamakhya temple
- Official name: Assamese — অম্বুবাচী মেলা
- Observed by: Hindus
- Type: Religious, folk
- Date: Middle of June
- Duration: 3 days
- Frequency: annual

The Ambubachi Mela (/ˈæmbuˌbɑːtʃi, ˌæmbuˈbɑːtʃi ˈmeɪlə, miːlə/) is an annual Hindu mela (gathering) held at Kamakhya Temple in Guwahati, Assam. This yearly mela is celebrated during the monsoon season that happens to fall during the Assamese month Ahar(আহাৰ) , around the middle of June when the sun transits to the zodiac of Mithuna, when the Brahmaputra River is in spate. During this time Brahmaputra River near the temple turns Red for three days.

Ambubachi Mela is the celebration of the yearly menstruation course of goddess Kamakhya. It is believed that the presiding goddess of the temple, Devi Kamakhya, the Mother Shakti, goes through her annual cycle of menstruation during this time stretch. It is also believed that during the monsoon rains, the creative and nurturing power of the 'menses' of Mother Earth becomes accessible to devotees at this site during the mela. There is no idol of the presiding deity but she is worshipped in the form of a yoni-like stone instead over which a natural spring flows.

== Tantric fertility festival ==
This mela is also known as Ameti or Tantric fertility festival since it is closely associated with Tantric Shakti cult prevalent in eastern parts of India. Even some Tantric Babas make their public appearances only during these four days. The rest of the year, they remain in seclusion. Some Babas are seen displaying their psychic powers like putting their heads in a pit and stand upright on it, or standing on one leg for hours at a stretch.

== The mela ==
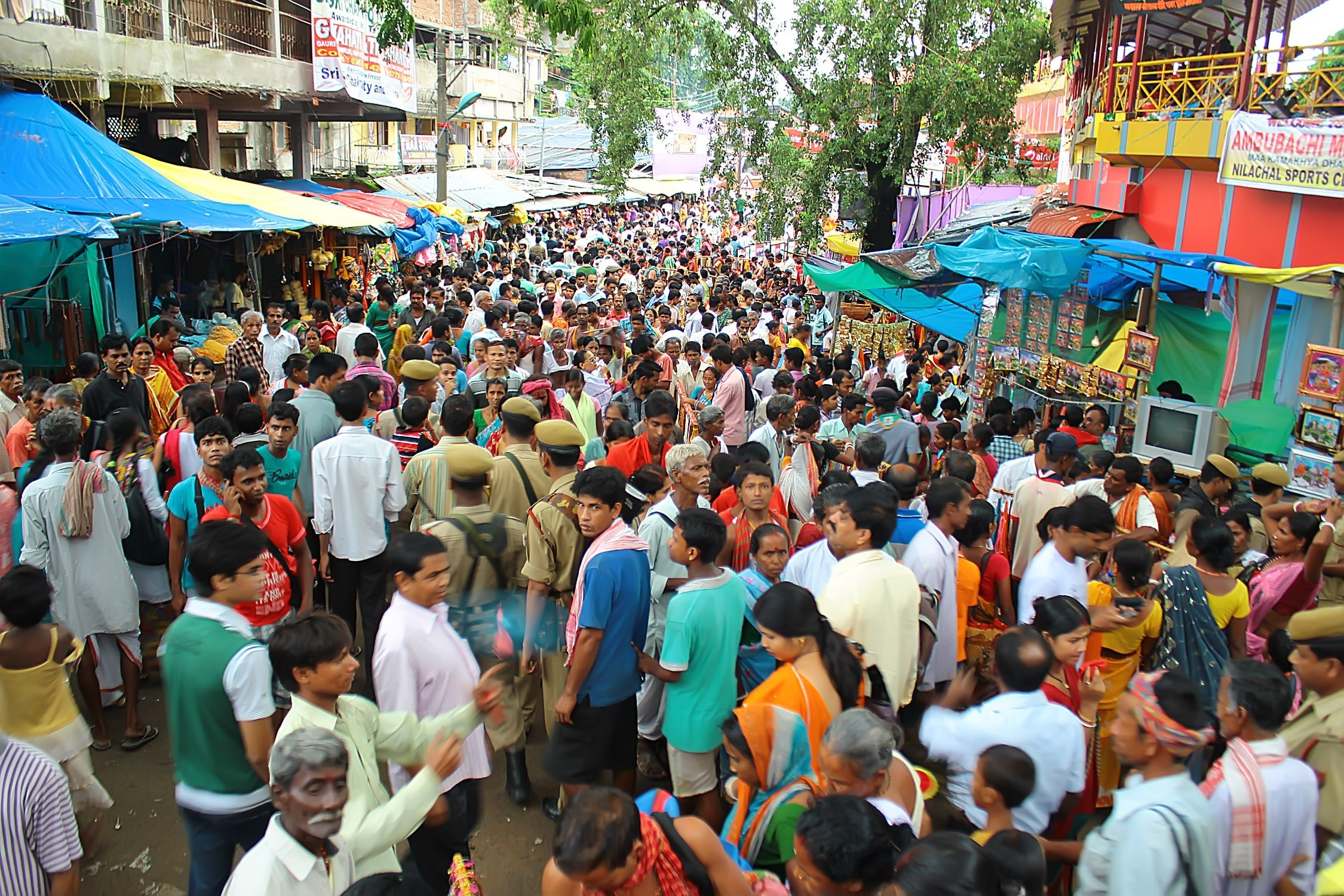
Gathering of people at Ambubashi Mela at India's Kamakhya Temple

The temple remains closed for three days during the mela for it is believed that Goddess Kamakhya rests for three days like the traditional women's menstrual seclusion. During these three days some restrictions are observed by the devotees like not cooking, not performing puja or reading holy books, no farming etc. After three days, the Goddess is bathed and other rituals are performed to ensure that Goddess Kamakhya is back to her original form. Then the doors of the temple are reopened and prasad is distributed. On the fourth day the devotees are allowed to enter the temple and worship devi Kamakhya.

=== The prasad ===
The prasad is distributed in two forms – Angodak and Angabastra. Angodak literally means the fluid part of the body - water from the spring and Angabastra literally means the cloth covering the body - a piece of the red cloth used to cover the yoni rock fissure during the days of menstruation.

== Pilgrims ==
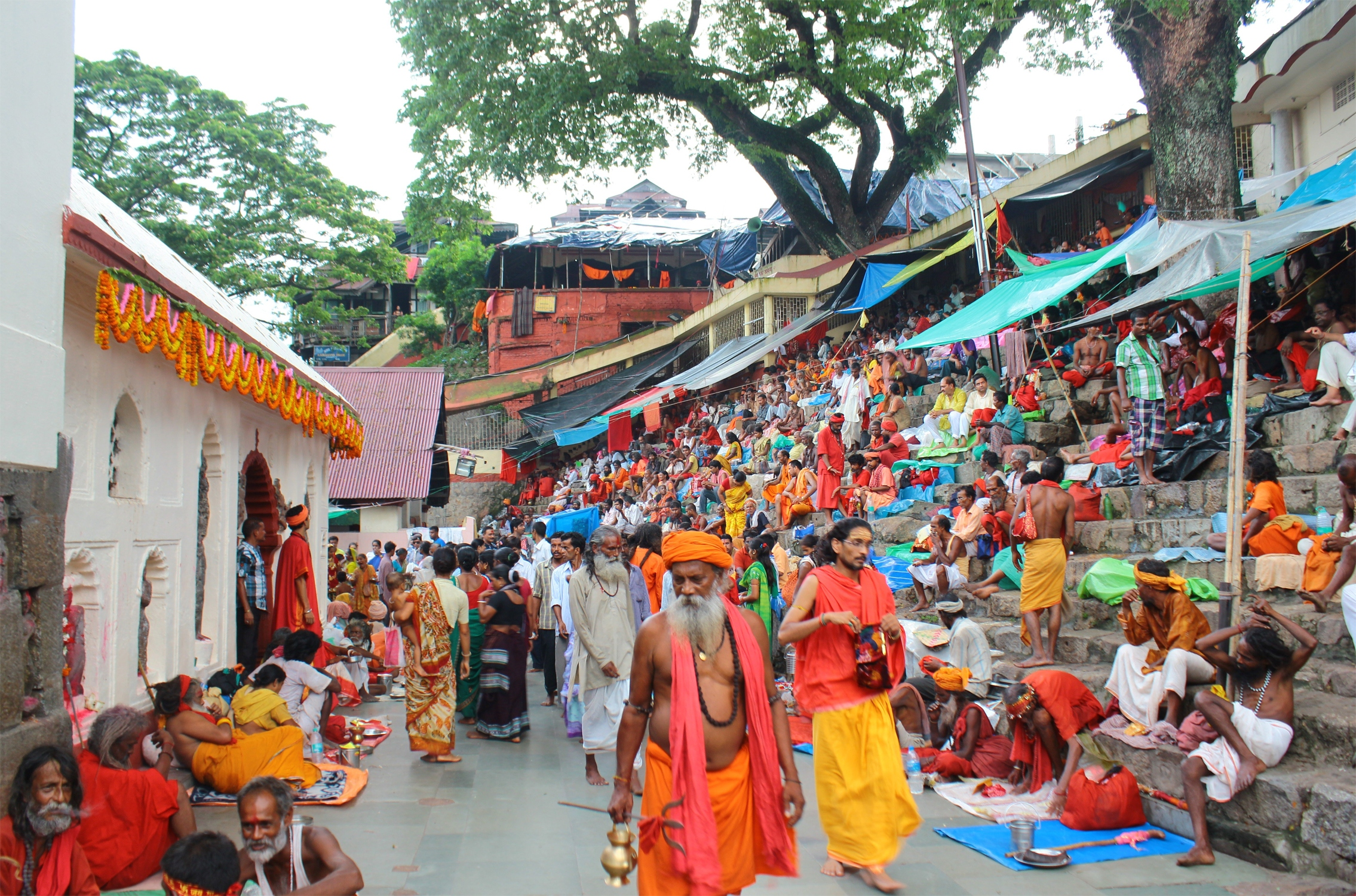
Sadhus gathered at Kamakhya Temple for the Ambubachi Mela

Every year lakhs of pilgrims, starting from Sadhus to householders, from all over India, come to Guwahati to observe this festival. They include Sanyasins, black clad Aghoras, the Khade-babas, the Baul or singing minstrels of West Bengal, intellectual and folk Tantriks, Sadhus and Sadhvis with long matted hair etc. Even foreigners from abroad come to seek blessings of mother Kamakhya.

== See also ==
- Assamese Culture
- Raja Parva
- Shaktism
