= Nilachal architecture =

Hindu temple architecture in the state of Assam

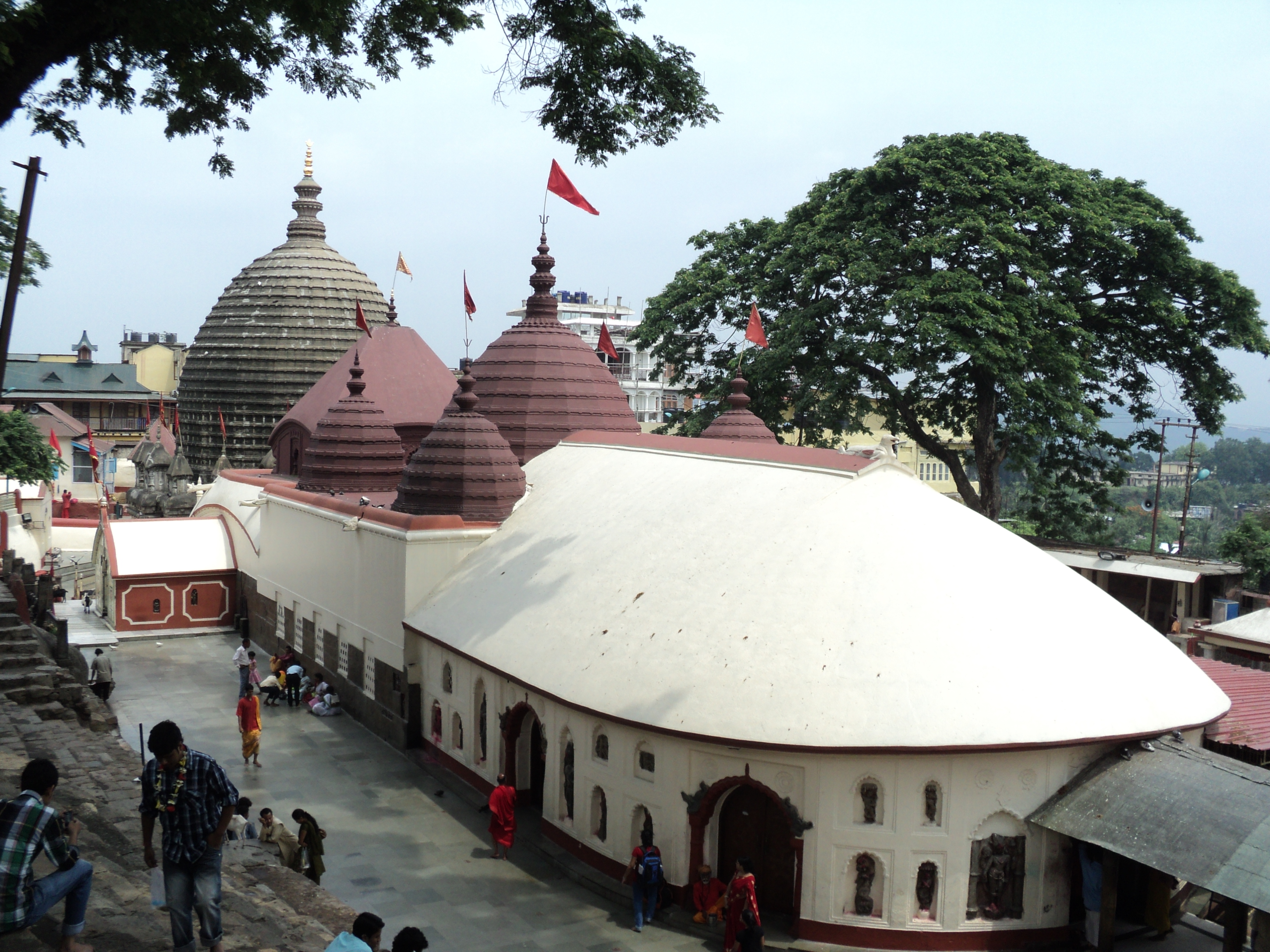
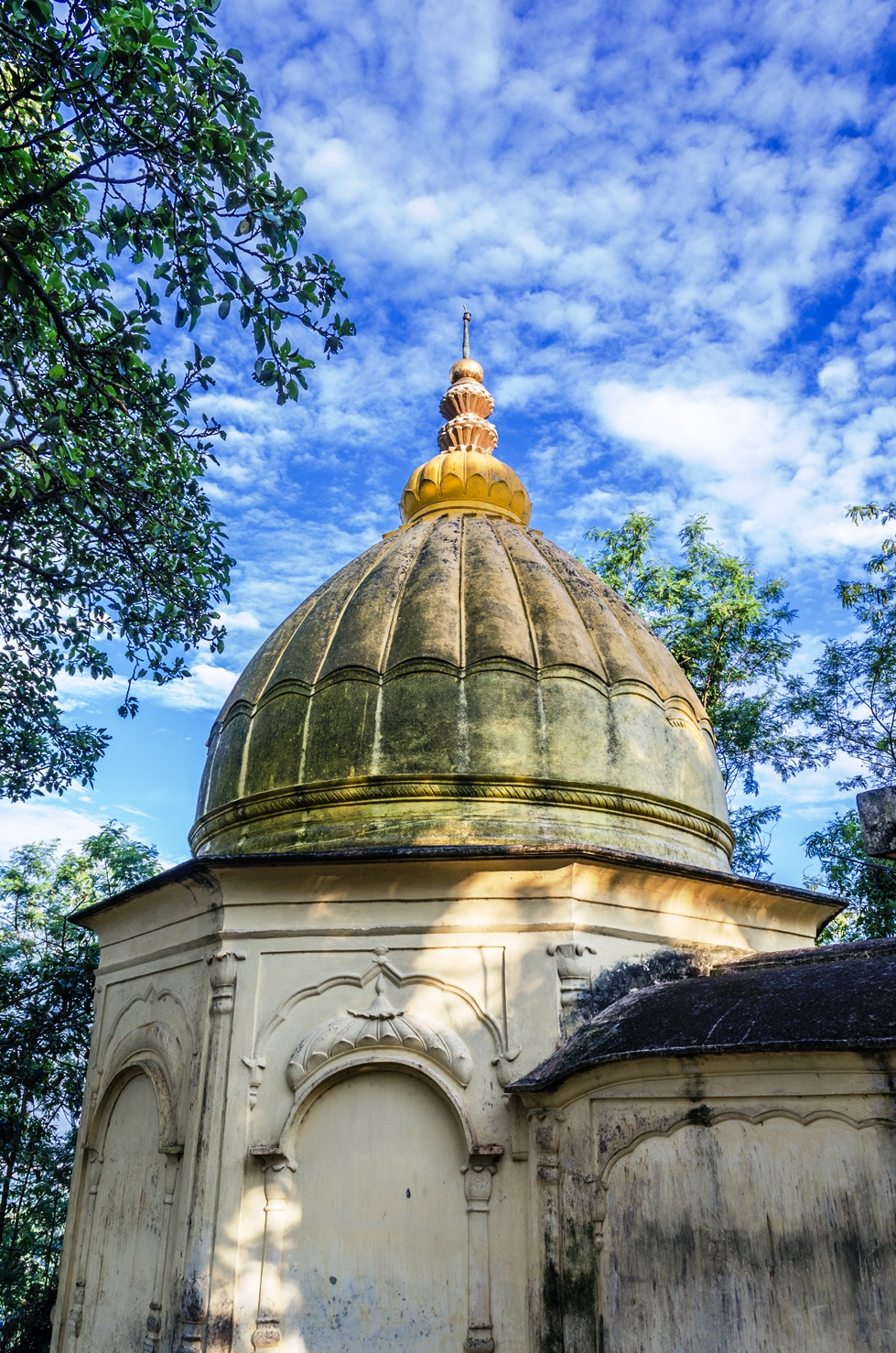
- Top: Kamakhya Temple at Nilachal hills in Guwahati; Bottom: Bhuvaneswari Temple in Guwahati
- Location: India

Nilachal is a style of Hindu temple architecture in Assam, India, that is characterized by a bulbous polygonal dome over a cruciform ratha type bada. This hybrid style developed first in the Kamakhya temple on the Nilachal hills under the Koch kingdom and became popular as a style later under the Ahom kingdom.

== Origin ==
The Koch king Viswasingha restarted worship at the ruins of the Kamakhya temple, and his son, Naranarayana decided to reconstruct the temple from the existing material lying scattered. He sent artisans and craftsmen under an army general named Meghamukdam. After two failed attempts at restoring the stone shikhara, Meghamukdam decided to take recourse to brick masonry and created the current dome. Made by craftsmen and architects more familiar with Islamic architecture of Bengal, the dome became bulbous and hemispherical which was ringed by minaret-inspired angashikharas.

== Examples ==
- Kamakhya temple
- Jai Dol
- Siddhesvara temple, Sualkuchi
