= Ratnapitha =

Ratnapitha is an area between river Karatoya and Sonkosh and one of the four Pithas or geographical divisions of ancient Kamrup, roughly equivalent to North Bengal and westernmost Goalpara region. It is believed that, each pitha of Kamrup is in charge of respective deities. Kamakhya is said to be the deity, which governs Kamapitha, whereas Jalpisa looks after Ratnapitha while Dikkarvasini takes charge of Saumarpitha.

== See also ==
- Kamarupa
- Jalpesh Temple
