= Yogini Tantra =

16th or 17th-century tantric text

The Yogini Tantra is a 16th- or 17th-century tantric text by an unknown author either from Assam or Cooch Behar and is dedicated to the worship of Hindu goddesses Kali and Kamakhya. Apart from religious and philosophical themes, this voluminous tantra contains some historical information.

The text is especially important for the vamachara form of tantric worship.

The Northeast Indian Yogini Tantra manuscript referenced here should not be confused with a classification of Vajrayana Tantras known as Anuttarayoga Tantras which include a sub-class known as the Mother Tantras which includes a further sub-classification known as the Yogini Tantras.

== Date and Place ==
The Yogini Tantra was written in Assam or Cooch Behar in the 16th or 17th century. The date is determined from the reference to the 16th-century Koch dynasty (kuvacha), who are said to have been born to a Mech woman. Some authors place it in the 17th century.

== Published Versions ==
There are contemporary published versions of the entire Yogini Tantra in Sanskrit, and there are versions that include Hindi language translations. There are no known published English language translations at this time. There is a partial English language summary of the contents of the Yogini Tantra available online and the Sanskrit language version includes an English language Preface and Introduction with important details about the manuscript including other published versions in Indic languages.
