= Kamakhya =

Hindu tantric goddess

- Goddess of Desire, Fertility, and Creative Power
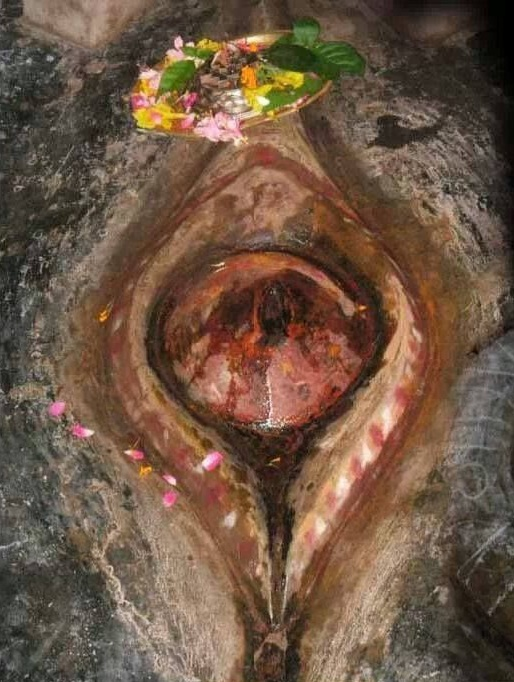
- The yoni of Kamakhya at the Kamakhya temple.
- Sanskrit transliteration: Kāmākhyā
- Affiliation: Mahadevi; Parvati; Tripura Sundari; Bhavani; Sati; Mahavidya
- Abode: Neelachal parvata
- Mantra: kāmākhye varade devī nīla parvata vāsinī tvaṁ devī jagataṁ mātā yonimudre namostute
- Weapon: sword, trishula, discus, shield, bow, arrows, club, lotus, bell, goad, kapala, conch
- Day: Sunday
- Mount: Lion
- Festivals: Ambubachi Mela, Navaratri
- Consort: Shiva

Kamakhya (Assamese pronunciation: [kämäikːʰä], Sanskrit: कामाख्या, romanized: Kāmākhyā), a mother goddess, is a Shakta Tantric deity; considered to be the embodiment of Kama (desire), she is regarded as the goddess of desire. Her abode–Kamakhya Temple is located in the Kamarupa region of Assam, India. Originally a Kirata goddess, residing on Nilachal hills across the banks of the Brahmaputra River, west of Guwahati. The temple has origins dating to the 10th/11th century and was rebuilt in 1565 CE, she is worshiped in a non-iconic and un-anthropomorphic form of stone shaped like yoni fed by a perennial stream. The temple is primary amongst the 51 Shakta pithas, and is one of the most important Shakta temples.

== Iconography ==
Kamakhya's iconography is mentioned in the Hindu scripture Kalika Purana. She has twelve arms and six heads of varying colours: white, red, yellow, green, black and colourful. Each head represents different ways to approach her in the path of Upasana. She is wearing opulent jewelry and red flowers such as hibiscus. She holds in each of ten hands a lotus, trident, sword, bell, discus, bow, arrows, club or scepter, goad, and shield. Her remaining two hands hold a bowl, which is made either of gold or a skull.

She is seated upon a lotus, representing Brahma, directly on top of Sweta Preta, or a White Corpse, symbolizing Shiva, who in turn lies on top of a lion.

== Origins ==
=== Historical ===
This historical origin of the Kamakhya Temple, to which the goddess Kamakhya is associated is not certain. The earliest stratum appears to be from the seventh century, and the evidence of a temple complex is dated to 10th/11th century. The Kalika Purana, dated similarly, gives an extensive description of the goddess, Assam and the temple.

=== Mythical ===
The origin of the Shakti Pitha at the site is associated with the legend of Sati, also known as Dakshayani, who was the wife of Shiva and daughter of the Puranic King Daksha. Daksha was unhappy with his daughter's choice of husband, and when he performed a grand yajna for all the deities, he did not invite Shiva or Sati. Sati however went to the sacrifice. Daksha humiliated Shiva, Sati couldn't bear the insults toward her husband and so, she jumped into the fire and left her body. Because she was the all-powerful mother goddess, Sati left her body in that moment to be reborn as the goddess Parvati. Meanwhile, Shiva was stricken with grief and rage at the loss of his wife. He threw two locks of his hair on the ground and from it emerged Virabhadra and Bhadrakali. Virabhadra and Mahakali destroyed the sacrifice while the former killed Daksha by cutting his head and burning it. After Daksha's family and the other gods implored Shiva to restore his life, Shiva ordered the head of the sacrificial goat to be brought to him. The goat's head was later fixed on Daksha's body. Daksha later repented for his wrongdoings. Shiva forgave him and saw Sati's charred body. He put Sati's body over his shoulder and began his tandava (dance of cosmic destruction) throughout the heavens, and vowed not to stop until the body was completely rotted away. The other gods, afraid of the annihilation of the 3 worlds, implored Vishnu to pacify Shiva. Thus, wherever Shiva wandered while dancing, Vishnu followed. He sent his weapon, the Sudarshana Chakra to destroy the corpse of Sati. Pieces of her body fell until Shiva was left without a body to carry. Seeing this, Shiva sat down to do Mahatapasya (great penance). Despite the similarity in name, scholars do not generally believe that this legend gave rise to the practice of sati.

According to various myths and traditions, there are 51 pieces of Sati's body scattered across the Indian subcontinent. These places are called Shakti Pithas and are dedicated to various powerful goddesses. Kamarupa ("form of desire") is the region in which the yoni ("vulva," "womb," or "source") is said to have fallen to earth, and the Kamakhya temple was said to have been constructed on this spot.

Devotees believe that, In Nilachal hill the yoni of Sati fell, And that yoni took the form of a woman who is called Kamakhya. The yoni is the place where the baby is reared for 9 months, and from this the baby enters this world. And it is believed to be the reason for the creation of the world. Devotees come here to worship the fallen yoni of divine world mother Goddess Sati which is in the form of Kamakhya and worship that Goddess Sati's womb as the cause of the creation and rearing of the world. Just as a child emerges from the yoni of a human mother, in the same way, the world has arisen from the yoni of Mother Goddess Sati which is in the form of Kamakhya.

== Legend ==
The legend of this goddess combines characters from Hindu literature and local traditions. Once, Narakasura, motivated by his desire, wanted to marry Kamakhya. When marriage was proposed, the goddess playfully put a condition before him that if he would be able to build a staircase from the bottom of the Nilachal Hill to the temple within one night before the cock crows to indicate dawn, then she would surely marry him. Naraka took it as a challenge, and tried all with his might to do this huge task. He was almost about to accomplish the job before it was dawn. Alarmed by this news, she strangled a cock, and made it crow untimely to give the impression of dawn to Naraka. Duped by the trick, Naraka left it halfway through. Now, the place is known as Kukurakata, situated in the district of Darrang. The incomplete staircase is known as Mekhelauja Path.

Upset with the treachery played by the devas, and as he knew himself to be unrivalled in prowess, he brought all the kingdoms on earth under his control. Next, he turned his eyes towards Svarga. Even the mighty Indra could not withstand the assault of this son of Vishnu, and had to flee the heavens. Narakasura had become the overlord of both the heavens and earth. As a punishment to all slights, he withheld the earrings of Aditi, the heavenly mother goddess, and took over some of her territory, while also capturing 16000 women for his own pleasure.

All the devas, led by Indra, went to Vishnu to ask him to deliver them from Narakasura. Vishnu promised them that he would attend to this matter, when he would be incarnated as Krishna.

As promised to Bhudevi, Narakasura was allowed to enjoy a long reign. At last, Vishnu was born as Krishna. Aditi, who was a relative of Krishna's wife, Satyabhama, (believed to be an avatar of Bhudevi - Narakasura's mother), approached Satyabhama for help. Satyabhama approached Krishna for permission to wage a war against Narakasura. As promised to the devas and Aditi, Krishna attacked the great fortress of Narakasura, riding his mount Garuda with his wife, Satyabhama. Krishna used the Narayanastra and the Agneyastra against the army of Narakasura. The battle was furiously fought. Narakasura possessed 11 akshauhinis that he unleashed on Krishna. However, the deity slew them all with little effort. Krishna also killed Mura, Narakasura's general. Thus, Krishna is called 'Murāri' (the killer of Mura).

Narakasura used several divine weapons against Krishna, but Krishna easily neutralised all of them. At last, when Narakasura tried to kill Krishna with a trident, he saw goddess Kamakhya standing beside Hari, and eventually Krishna beheaded him with his Sudarshana Chakra (discus).

Before Narakasura's death, he is regarded to have requested a boon from his mother, Satyabhama, that everyone should celebrate his death with colorful light. Thus, this day is celebrated as 'Naraka Chaturdashi' - the day before Deepavali. Krishna accepted the women Naraka had captured as his wives upon their insistence to save their honour, since the populace viewed them as the spoils of Narakasura. The chief amongst them is sometimes called Rohini. After their weddings, they all lived in Dvaraka.

== Identity ==
Kamakhya is mentioned in the Kalika Purana as one of the most important goddess of Tantric worship, and is referred to in the text as Mahamaya, the "great goddess of illusion", who takes on many forms depending on her mood. Devotees also call her Kameshvari ("beloved goddess of desire"), and consider her a form of Tripura Sundari, also called Shodashi. She is identified with Kali in the Kalika Purana, Yoginitantra and Kamakhya Tantra, each of which echoes this verse:

"It is certainly well known that Kamakhya is truly none other than that mother goddess Kali, who is in all things the form of wisdom."

Kamakhya is associated with the Mahavidyas, who each have temples dedicated to them at the Kamakhya temple complex in Assam. She is also closely associated with Durga.

Mantras for general worship of the Mahavidyas at the Kamakhya temple complex reveal a close identity with Kamakhya herself. Several of these goddesses are worshipped as forms of Kamakhya explicitly. Kamakhya's Ashtashaktis or eight incarnations are Guptakama, Srikama, Vindhyavasini, Kotishvari, Vanadurga, Padadurga, Dirgheshvari and Bhuvaneshvari.

== See also ==
- Kamakhya Temple
- Kamaksha temple
- Ambubachi Mela
