= Airtel Run for Education =

Airtel Run for Education, started by Round Table India and Bharti Airtel Limited in 2014, is an annual fund raising sporting event, aimed at contributing towards the cause of providing education for the underprivileged children.

== Marathons ==
=== 2014 ===
According to the event's website, "Funds raised through the event in 2014, was used towards building classroom facilities in Vivekananda Vidya Mandir, Barasat and the recipient of the year’s aid were Sarada Sishu Mandir, Tanterberia, Howrah."

=== 2015 ===
Airtel Run for Education 2015 was held in Calcutta in association with The Telegraph. With around 7,000 participants running for the cause, the event raised around 80 lakh rupees which were donated at a school in Howrah.

The event was divided in three parts on the basis of the distance covered with around 300 participants registering for the 21 km run, which was the longest in the event. Second race was nearly 10 km, with the last one being able to grab the maximum number of participants, counting to 5,500, the round was 5 km long. With a completion time of 1.11.34 hours, Daniel Langat, a professional runner from Kenya, won the 21 km race, getting an award with a cash prize of Rs 35,000. The races were flagged off by the guest at the event, Kiran Bedi.

=== 2016 ===
Airtel Run for Education 2016 was held on 27 November in Calcutta. The event included seven panel members including Michelle Kakade, Vir Inder Nath, CEO of Bharti Airtel West Bengal and Odisha, Subir Saha, Director of Medfit, Manpreet Singh, Round Table India National President, Kunal Khilani, race director and marathon convener, Sandeep Harabjanka, RTI area IV chairman, Shobhan Kumar, Hyatt director of operations, with Sonika Chuahan as an anchor.

== Round Table India ==
Round Table India (RTI) is a non-political and non-sectarian organization of people aged between 18 and 40. The organization is aimed at uplifting the underprivileged children. The organization claims to be donating the money earned to freedom through education projects.

The RTI actively helped people by distributing relief material in the flood-affected areas of Jorhat and Golaghat relieving 1,200 families. In association with the NGO, Robin Hood Army, RTI, under the campaign "Freedom from Hunger", distributed 70,000 packets of food among the underprivileged.
