= Golaghat Baptist Church =

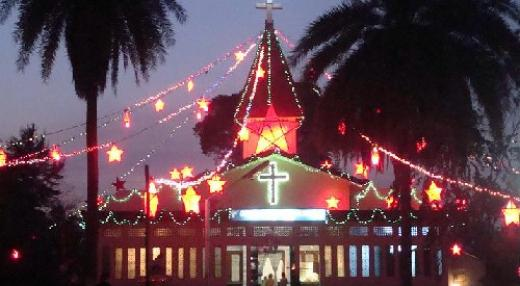
- Front façade of Baptist Church, Golaghat
- Interactive map of Golaghat Baptist Church
- 26.5246203°N 93.9677575°E
- Location: Mission Compound; Golaghat, Assam

History
- Design period: 1890s - 1900s (nineteenth century)
- Built: 1898; 128 years ago

Site notes
- Architectural style: Assam Type

The Golaghat Baptist Church is a Baptist Church in Assam located in the city of Golaghat, India. It is affiliated with the Assam Baptist Convention.

== History ==
The church has its origins in a mission of Dr. O. L. Swanson, a missionary from America, who had come to Assam in 1893 along with his wife. Dr. Swanson was assisted by a number of local people to erect this church. It was established in December 1898. Christianity was on the rise during the late 1800s and early 1900s in Upper - Assam and quite a few church buildings were erected during that period. These were termed Indigenous Churches by the American Missionaries and the cost of these church buildings if paid in hard cash would've amounted to ₹1500 at that time. The missionary work was becoming more fully organized during that period, and that led the formation of the church.

== See also ==
- ABC
- Assam
- Golaghat
- Golaghat district
