= Golaghat Amateur Theatre Society =

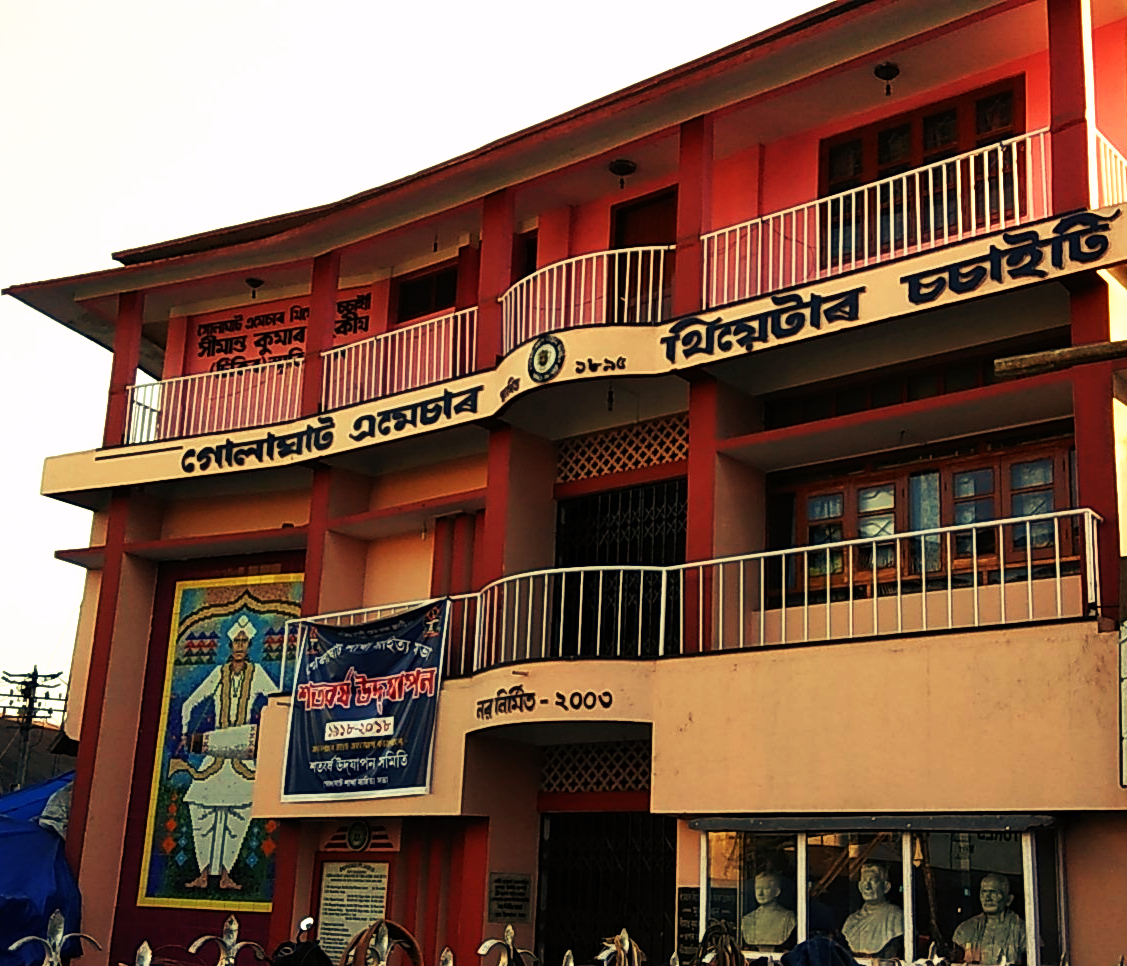
- Façade of GATS
- Abbreviation: GATS
- Formation: 1895; 131 years ago
- Headquarters: Dhodar Ali (Road); Golaghat
- Region served: Assam, primarily Golaghat
- Members: Exec. Members - 24 Exec. Co-opted Members - 8 + Lifetime Members
- Official language: Assamese, English
- President: A. Baruah
- Vice President: M. Roy

Golaghat Amateur Theatre Society is a society for promoting performing arts, such as music, dance, and theatre; literature, such as poetry, novels and short stories; and visual arts, such as drawing, painting, photography, with more than 100 years of history representing the arts industry of Golaghat and Assam. The society was formed at Golaghat in Assam to bring Assamese people closer to the world of performing and visual arts.

== History ==
Established in the year 1895, the Golaghat Amateur Theatre Society (informally GATS), was formed by a group of philanthropists led by Late Joy Chandra Maitra and others who envisioned to develop a centre for uplifting the dramatic and cultural talents in the state of Assam, particularly in Golaghat area. The permanent theatre hall of the society, commonly known as “Amateur Theatre Hall” is one of the oldest dramatic arts' buildings in the state of Assam and has been in existence for over 117 years. The society's heritage and significant contribution to the Assamese culture in the field of arts, was recognised by the Government of India, and it was awarded funds for its development under India's former Prime Minister – Manmohan Singh's vision book.

== Structure ==
The Society conducts a series of cultural events throughout the year, including experimental theatres executed as per the mechanism adopted by its Managing Committee. The society has an executive body consisting of 32 members, besides lifetime members.

== Present ==
The society has been organising “All Assam One-Act Drama Competition” in the memory of distinguished dramatist Surendra Nath Saikia since 1981, encouraging participation from the citizens of different parts of the state in dramatic and cultural activities. In addition to the experimental theatres, the society also actively participates in recognising talents from various walks of life, such as poets and littérateurs of Assamese literature.
