= British Cemetery, Golaghat =

Golaghat British Cemetery
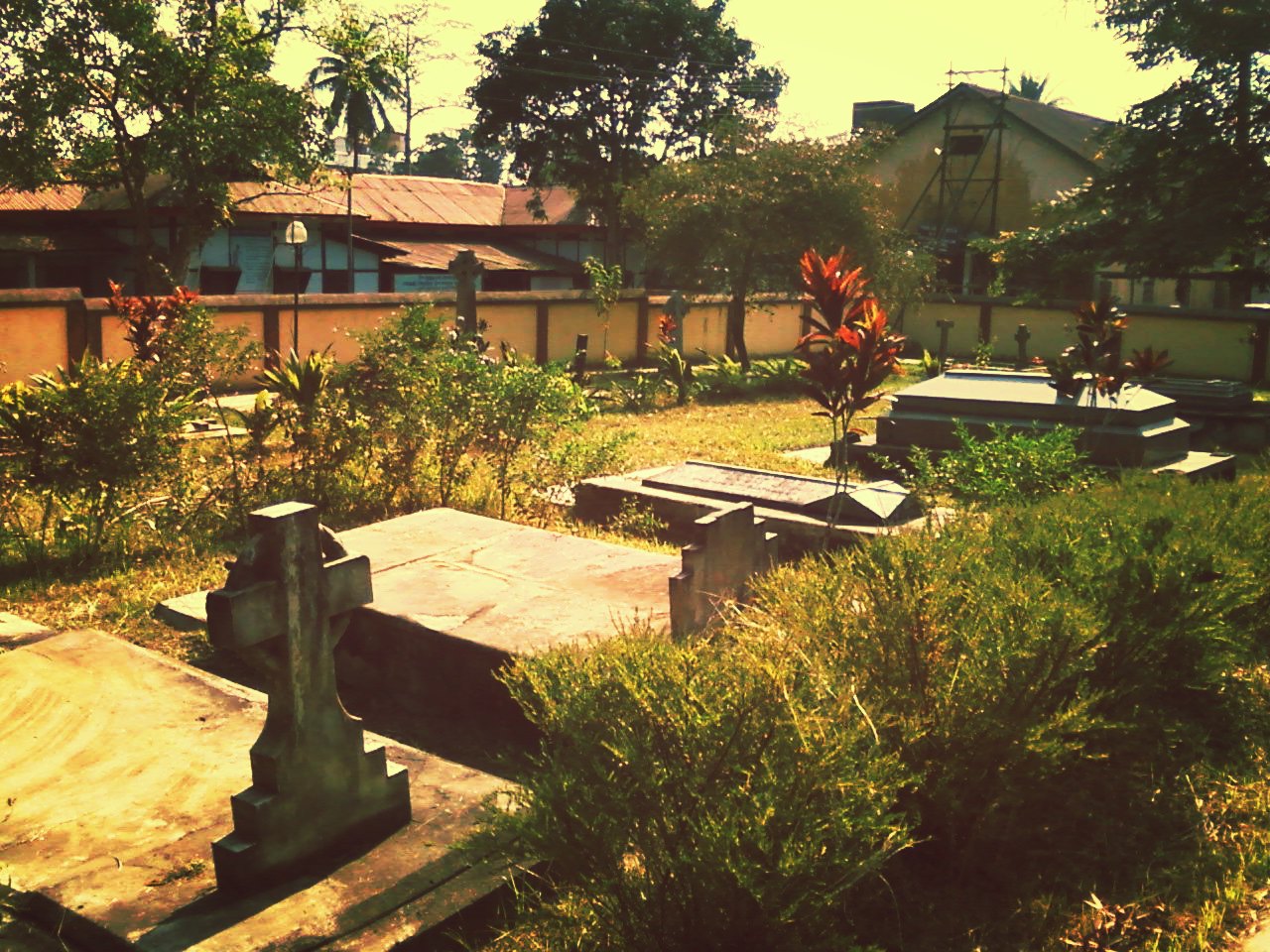
- Inside Golaghat British Cemetery
- Interactive map of Golaghat British Cemetery

Details
- Established: 1876; 150 years ago
- Location: Golaghat, Assam
- Country: India
- Coordinates: 26.509362°N 93.9661878°E
- Type: Military
- Owned by: Golaghat Municipal Board
- No. of graves: 28

The Golaghat British Cemetery is a cemetery located on the premises opposite to Cally Coomer Doss & Co., adjacent to the circle office of Assam Power Distribution Company Limited at Golaghat, Assam, India. It is one of Assam's oldest burial grounds dating back to India's pre-independence era, containing 28 burials of British officers of tea estates and their families, and is open for public viewing.

The oldest grave in the cemetery is that of Capt. John Butler, then political agent who died at the age of 33 on 7 January 1876. Butler was one of the first British officers to lead expeditions to the Naga and Manipur hills. The cemetery also houses the grave of John Gordon McIntosh, then manager of Bukhial tea estate, who died in a plane crash on 12 May 1957. McIntosh had his own personal Aeronca chief single engine propeller airplane that he flew himself, accompanied by his German shepherd.

Golaghat Municipal Board maintains the cemetery premises, including preventing any land encroachment near the cemetery.

== See also ==
- Golaghat district
