= Debo Prasad Barooah =

Indian academic and historian

- Born: 1 October 1930; Golaghat, Assam, India
- Died: 28 January 2013 (aged 82); Guwahati, Assam, India
- Occupations: Academician, Historian, Ex-VC Gauhati University
- Spouse: Renu Devi (Barooah)

Debo Prasad Barooah was an Indian academician, author, historian and the former Vice-Chancellor (the Chief Executive) of Gauhati University. Barooah, highly regarded for his knowledge of political science and history of the region had a brilliant academic record beginning with his graduation in 1954.

== Life and education ==
Barooah was born in Golaghat to the family of Tara Prasad Barooah. His father Tara Prasad Barooah was also an eminent lawyer of Assam, University Prize-man, Gold-medalist in English from Calcutta University. Barooah passed his matriculation from Golaghat – Government Boys Bezbarooah Higher Secondary School and graduated with first class in 1954 and got masters in History from Gauhati University in 1956 where he topped his class. He started his teaching career as a lecturer in the Department of History at Gauhati University taking up the papers on International Relations. Later he also started teaching at the Department of Political Science (1958) Gauhati University, as one of the founding teachers. After the retirement of Prof. V.V. Rao from the department, Prof. D.P. Barooah finally joined the Department of Political Science and started heading it as well. He did his D Phil on the thesis Indo-British Relations 1950–60. He was UGC Emeritus Fellow for two years and was also Senior Associate of National Institute of Advanced Studies, Bangalore. He was married to Renu Devi, Former Dean – Faculty of Arts, Gauhati University, Assam.

== Research papers and books ==
Barooah is credited for a large number of research papers, which are highly regarded in intellectual circles. Some of those have been published in national and international journals. Few of his published works are:

1. World History
2. Indo-British Relations 1950–60
3. World War I and II and other Essays

Some of his other work, among others; include:

- Aspects of History of Assam
- Karagaror Diary
- foolmoni (novel)
- Anchalikotar dostabez
- Desh-Bidesh:Drsti aru anubhav Vol.I
- Desh-Bidesh:Drsti aru anubhav Vol.II
- Rooplekha (Story, etc.)
- Yuddha aru santi
- Bharotor boideshik niti (edited by:Pabitra narayan borah)
- Swadesh aru swajatir dostabez (collection by:Pabitra narayan borah)
- Gaon khonor pora jogot khonoloi (collection by:Pabitra narayan borah)
- Prithibir prothom samajtantrik biplob.

== Career ==
As an academician he mentored many students and researchers and acted as guide to 23 scholars. He was involved in several post-retirement assignments, including his association with the University Grants Commission.

As a writer his write-ups had been published in various English National Dailies. He was a Guest Column Writer for The Telegraph newspaper published from Kolkata.

Barooah was a Professor and Head of Political Science from 1978 till his appointment as Gauhati University Vice-Chancellor in 1986. Barooah was also a nationalist blended with regionalism and had contributions in different assignments including a case relating to 17 May 1996, murder of noted journalist Parag Kumar Das. A Division Bench of the Gauhati High Court, comprising Chief Justice J Chalemeswar and Justice Hrishikesh Roy, admitted a revision petition as regards investigation into the case. The court had then registered the plea on the basis of a letter written by Dr. Debo Prasad Barooah to the Chief Justice of the High Court where, in his letter, Barooah alleged "slackness on part of the CBI in investigating the case."

Barooah played a role in organising the first political convention of the AGP in Golaghat in October 1985. But he stayed away from direct involvement with any political party.

== Death ==
Barooah died on 28 January 2013 due to cardiac arrest. His death was deplored by various people including Assam's Governor JB Patnaik and Minister for Information & Public Relations – Basanta Das. Chief Minister Tarun Gogoi also expressed his deep condolence at the demise of Dr Barooah. In their condolence messages, they said that "Assam has lost a great educationist, academician, litterateur and a social worker."
