= Golaghat =

- City
- Golaghat Municipal Board
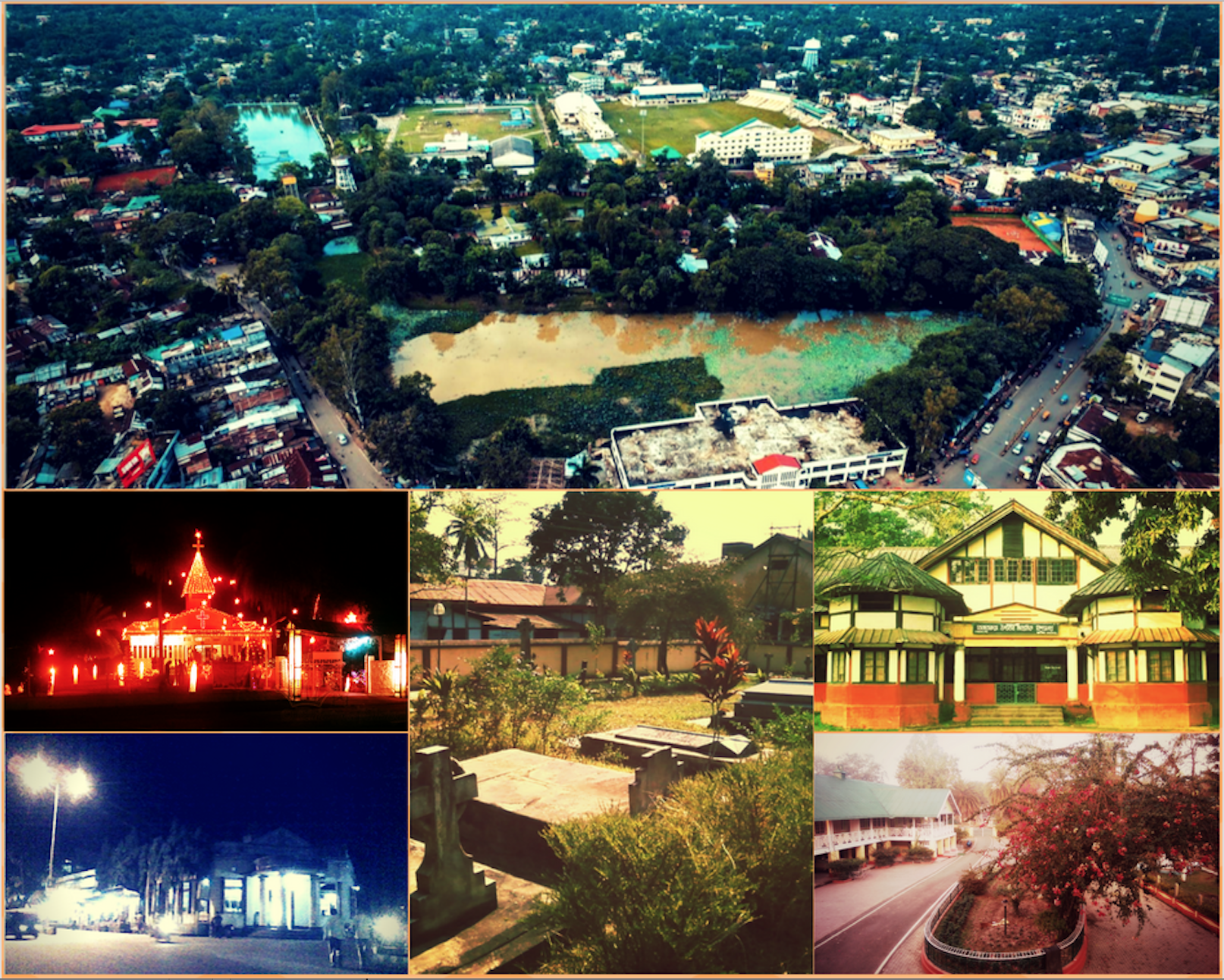
- alt = Golaghat Montage. Clicking on an image in the picture causes the browser to load the appropriate article or section of this article. Clockwise from top: Skyline of Golaghat Central (west), Heritage buildings and sites: Bezbaroa Higher Secondary School, Circuit House, British Cemetery, Doss & Co. Store and Baptish Church

- Location in Assam, India Golaghat (India)
- Coordinates: 26.52°N 93.97°E
- Country: India
- State: Assam
- Region: Upper Assam
- District: Golaghat
- Settled: 20th century
- Founded: 1839
- Consolidated: 1920

Government
  - Type: Municipality
  - Body: GMB
  - District Commissioner: Biswajit Phukan, ACS

Area
  - Total: 17 km^{2} (6.6 sq mi)
- Elevation: 95 m (312 ft)

Population (2011)
  - Total: 41,489
  - Rank: 18th in Assam
  - Density: 3,500/km^{2} (9,100/sq mi)
- Demonym: Golaghatian
- Time zone: UTC+5:30 (IST)
- PIN: 6 areas: 785621, 785622, 785702; H.O. (Head Post Office); •Central; S.O. (Sub-office)^{†}; •Bengenakhowa; B.O. (Branch office)^{†}; • Adharsatra; • Missionpatty; • Pulibor; • Dhekial
- Telephone Code: +91 - (0) 3774 - XX XX XXX
- ISO 3166 code: IN-GG
- Vehicle registration: AS – 05 – XX – XXXX
- Sex Ratio: 964 ♀️/ 1000 ♂️
- Climate: Cwa
- Official Language: Assamese
- Planning agency: 1
- Literacy Rate: ▼77.43% low
- Lok Sabha Constituency: Kaliabor
- Vidhan Sabha Constituency: Golaghat, Bokakhat, Sarupathar, Khumtai, Dergaon
- Website: golaghat.assam.gov.in

Golaghat (English: /ˈɡoʊlɑːɡhɑːt/ Gʊlaɡʱat ['ɡʊlaɡʱat]), the 3rd largest subdivision of the Indian state of Assam, later elevated to the position of a full–fledged district headquarter on 5 October 1987, is a city and a municipality and the seat of administrative operations of Golaghat district, besides being a twin city to Jorhat which is about 55 km away. It is one of the oldest urban areas in Assam that recently featured on the Smart Cities nominations list, along with Guwahati and four other prominent urban areas of the state; although losing out to Guwahati at the final stage. The Dhansiri, one of the tributaries of the Brahmaputra, passes through Golaghat and is the primary water source for its citizens.

One of the earliest tea urban centres in Assam that has been the headquarters of the oldest subdivision for over 188–189 years since 1839, the local government body, Golaghat Municipal Board (GMB), was set up in early 1920, becoming a long-established civic body of the state, formed before independent India. It is a historical body of 107–108 years of age in continuous operation.

Golaghat has the inceptive post/mail service and telegraphic communication systems in Assam going back to 1876. The oldest social – literature/rhetorical congresses of Assam – the Golaghat Sahitya Sabha of Asam Sahitya Sabha, also began here in 1918. The Golaghat Amateur Theatre Society (GATS), one of the premier theater societies of the state, was set up here in 1895 to uplift the dramatic and cultural activities in the region, particularly Golaghat. The Golaghat Bar Association (GBA), founded in 1891, is one of the oldest legal societies in Assam, especially in the Upper – Assam division.

Golaghat has a number of heritage buildings and sites – the Golaghat British Cemetery, constructed in 1876, the Bezbaruah Higher Secondary School, set up in the late 19th century in the year 1886 by the educationalist Dinanath Bezbarua, the Baptist Church founded by the American missionaries in 1898, the Christian High (Mission) School built by the American Women Foreign Mission Society in 1919, Assam's first department store – Doss & Co., constructed in 1930 and incorporated under the Registrar of Companies (RoC) – Shillong in the year 1955 to name a few.

The headquarters of Assam Valley Tea Planters' Association (now Assam Tea Planters Association) were also based in Golaghat. Set up in 1941 under Mahendra Nath Barooah's management, (Note: In 1941, Mahendra Nath Barooah of Golaghat, the newly-elected Secretary moved the office to one of his cottages at Golaghat. The headquarters remained for nine years. Assam Tea Planters Association – About Us: http://www.atpa.in/about.html) the erstwhile headquarters played a significant role in enrolling associate members, besides laying the first foundations of growth, recognition and reputation that the association is presently credited for. Golaghat also has one of the oldest boards of trades and industries in the state. The United Chamber of Commerce (UCC) formed in 1954 antecedes many newer chambers of commerce that have been set up in the state in the more recent years.

Assam's first major regional political party, the AGP was formed here and launched in the year 1985 at the historic Golaghat Convention and by 2008; the same members of the convention reunified the party at this place.

The place is also the headquarters of The North Eastern Tea Association (NETA), one of the tea growers' groups in the state of Assam, a constituent member of Consultative Committee of Plantation Associations (CCPA), Assam Valley branch.

== Etymology ==
The name Golaghat (gola which means shop and ghat meaning the landing point of river ferry or enclosure for boats) originated from the shops established by the Marwari businessmen during the mid-20th century on the bank of Dhansiri river near present Golaghat.

There is another view, which is more sophisticated and older than the arrival of the British and Indian businessmen. During the Ahom kingdom era, there was a storehouse of cannonballs also locally called Gola and transported by local ferry Ghat, from which name Golaghat has been derived.

== History ==
=== 9th century ===
The stone inscription of Nagajari-khanikar village of Sarupathar, dating back to the 5th century, reveals that there was an independent kingdom in Doyang – Dhansiri valley and the relics of ramparts, brick structures, temples and tanks etc. discovered in these areas suggest the presence of a kingdom during the 9th and 10th century.

=== Under Ahoms ===
The Doyang – Dhansiri valley came under the rule of Ahom dynasty during the 16th century. During Ahom rule, this area was under Morongi-khowa Gohain, an administrative officer.

=== Early modern ===
In 1751, certain portions of Barpathar, Sarupathar Barangi mauzas of Golaghat circle and Duarbagari of Bokakhat circle were transferred to the United Mikir and N.C. Hills districts.

During the last phrase of the Ahom kingdom, when the independent sovereignty of Ahoms had come to an end, Purandar Singha was entrusted in 1833 with the administration of Upper – Assam by the East India Company who had already won mastery over Assam. However, this artificial ornamentation by the scion of Ahom Royal House was short-lived, and in the year 1838, the whole area was resumed by the authorities of the company and annexed to the British territory with the appointment of Col. Aham White as the political agent on 16 September during the same year.

By a proclamation in 1839, the British took possession of Assam and the area was divided into two districts of Lakhimpur and Sibsagar, where the Doyang – Dhansiri valley was included under the newly formed Golaghat subdivision of Sibsagar district in 1839. Golaghat became the largest subdivision in Assam and comprised Dergaon and Golaghat circles. Golaghat circle was the largest among them with 150.10 square miles of area, while Dergaon was the smallest. During this time, Purandar Singha continued to rule with Jorhat as the capital of his territory, Upper – Assam, but with the formation of two other subdivisions, one at Jaipur and the other at Golaghat.

On 18 December 1846, Jorhat was declared a subdivision comprising certain portions of Golaghat subdivision. The earliest head post offices of the Assam circle of British Assam were located in Golaghat besides Debrughur, Goahati, Jorhat, Nowgong, Sibsagar, Shillong and Tezpore. (Note: Spelled as in the book – A Glimpse of Assam)

Fountain at display in Golaghat

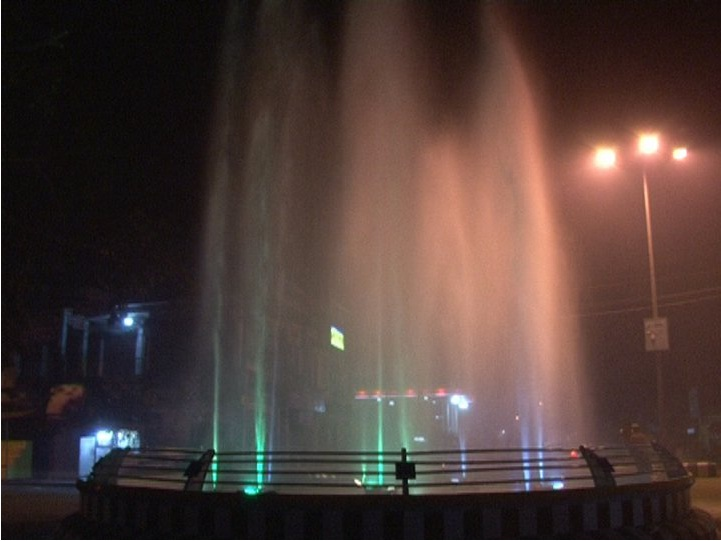
View under pale lighting

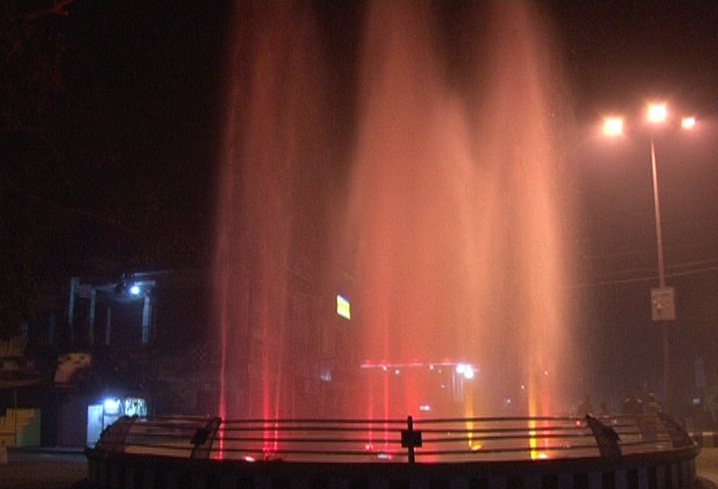
View under dark lighting

Much later after telegraph lines had been stretched between Calcutta and Guwahati in 1869; Golaghat got its speaking wires' system in and around 1876. The lines were stretched to connect Golaghat with Kohima, Shillong with Goahati, Sibsagar with Nazerah and Debrughur with Makum. (Note: Spelled as in the book – A Glimpse of Assam Population and Education, page 25)

In British Assam, Golaghat derived its importance chiefly because of having advanced communication systems during that time and on account of its connection by road with Kohima. (Note: Stations, page 67 A Glimpse of Assam) One of the oldest railway lines in Assam was also built in Golaghat. The text noted from the book Glimpse of Assam written by Mrs. S.R. Ward in 1884 state:

Mr Bryers who was then the Chief of Cachar and Assam Railway Survey succeeded in finding a railway route that would be carried up the Dhunsiri valley to Golaghat... thus giving Assam direct railway communication with Chittagong and Calcutta.

(Note: Stations, page 74 A Glimpse of Assam)

=== Late modern and contemporary ===
Golaghat elevated to the position of a full-fledged district in Assam comprising an area of 3,502 km^{2} (or 1, 352.13 sq. mi) on 5 October 1987 and is known for its notable contribution in India's independence movement, arts and culture, literature and sports in the region.

- Kushal Konwar, Kamala Miri, Dwariki Das, Biju Vaishnav, Sankar Chandra Barua, Tara Prasad Barooah, Maheshwar Barooah, Rajendra Nath Barua, Gaurilal Jain, Ganga Ram Bormedhi and Dwarikanath Goswami are Indian independence activists of the town.
- The 19th century writer, Hem Chandra Barua, who authored the first Assamese dictionary Hemkosh hailed from Golaghat.
- Ghanashyam Barua, a resident of this place, reckoned in the field of politics as the first Central Minister of Assam, translated William Shakespeare's The Comedy of Errors into Assamese along with three of his partners.
- Several national and international sportspeople in fields of athletics, table tennis, tennis, boxing and football have come from Golaghat.
- Numaligarh Refinery is the biggest revenue generating industrial sector in Golaghat.

== Administration ==
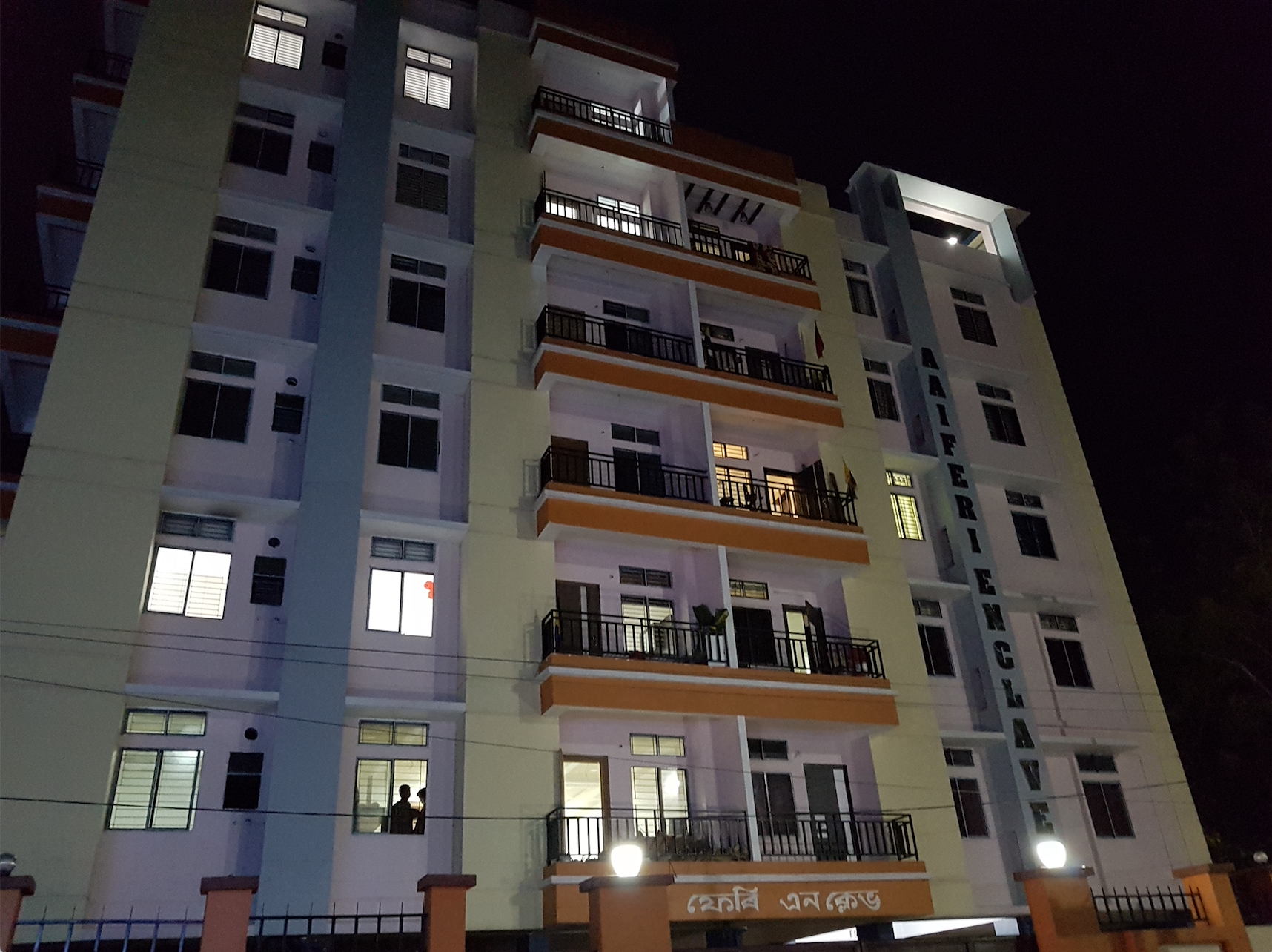
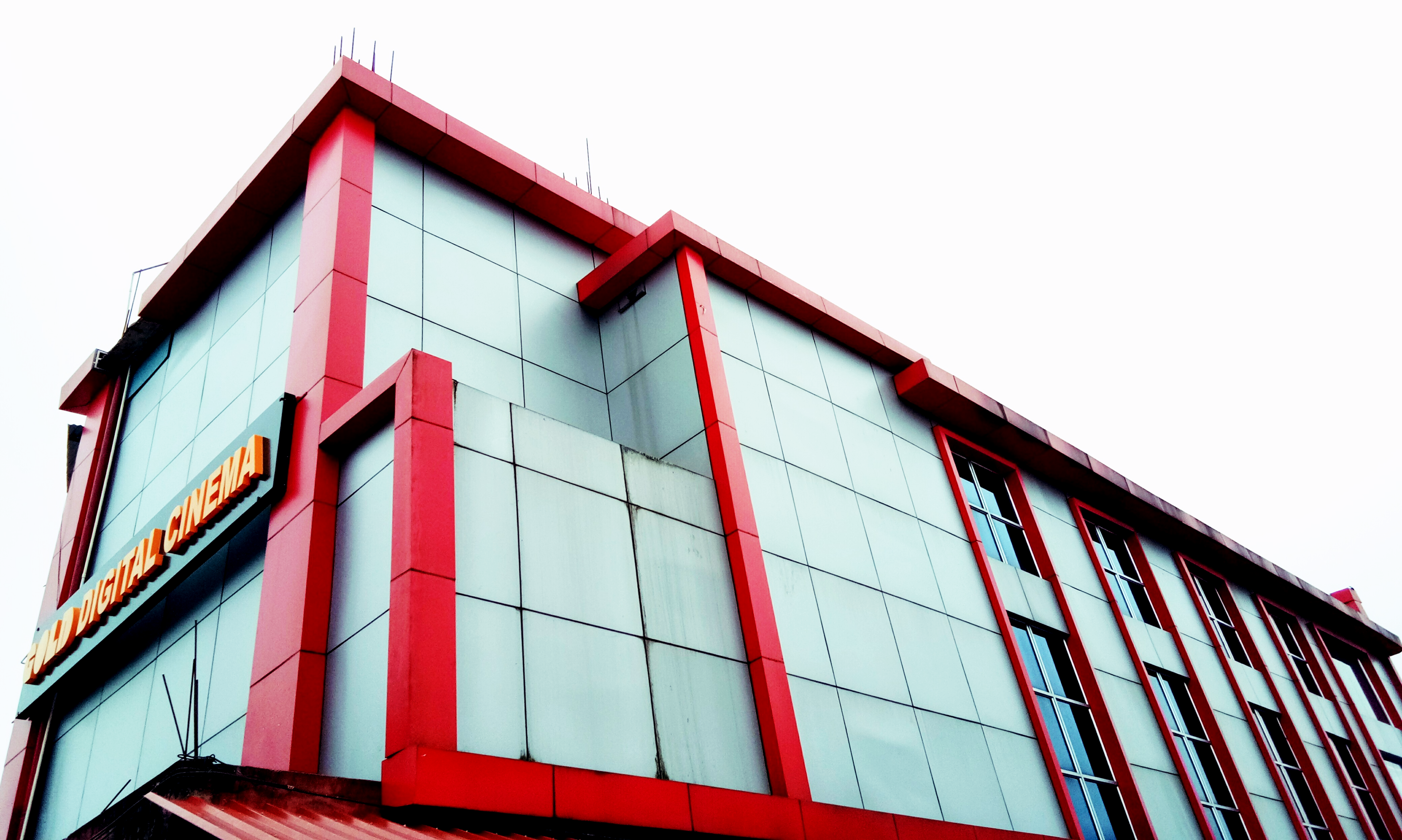
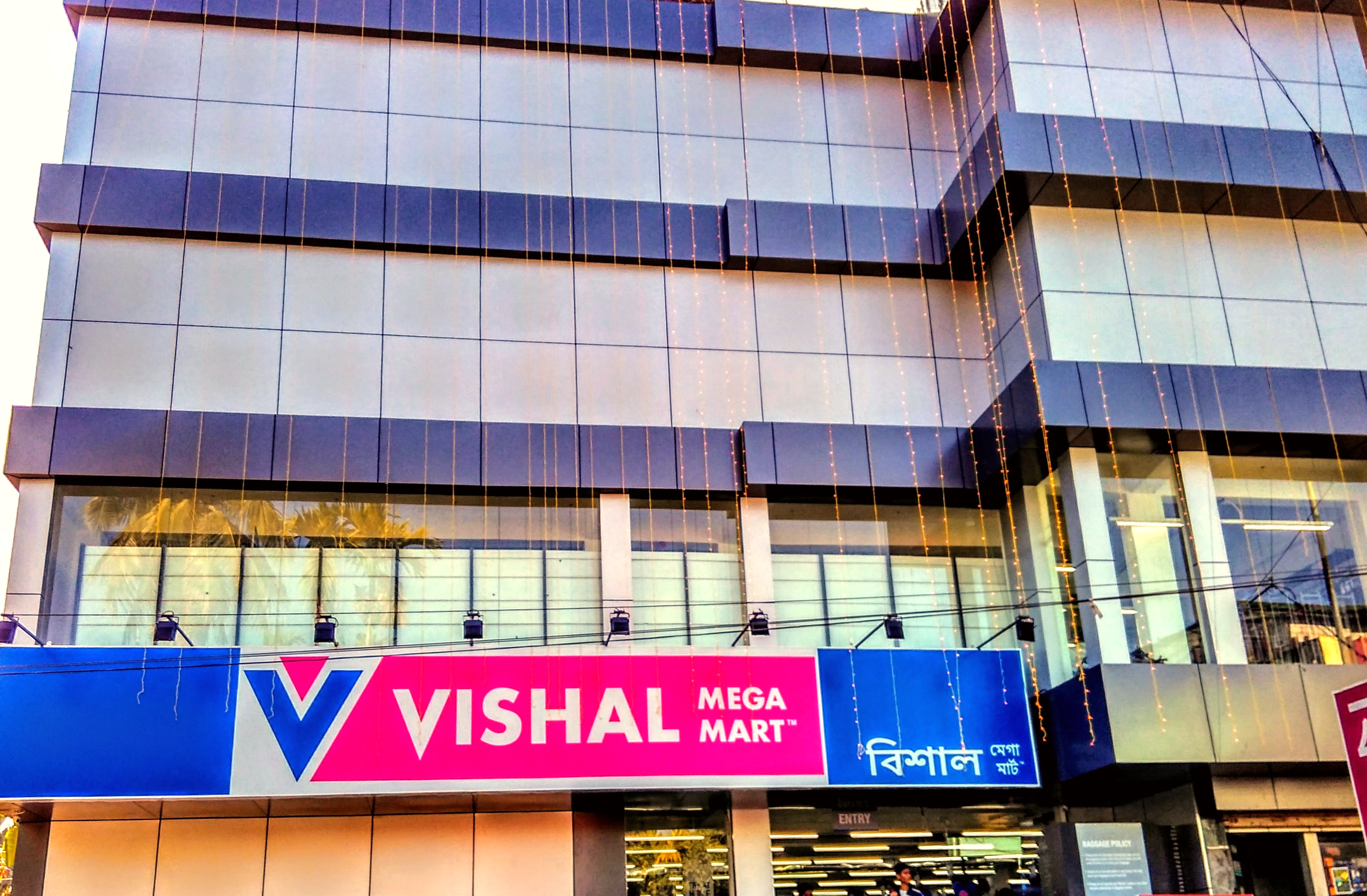
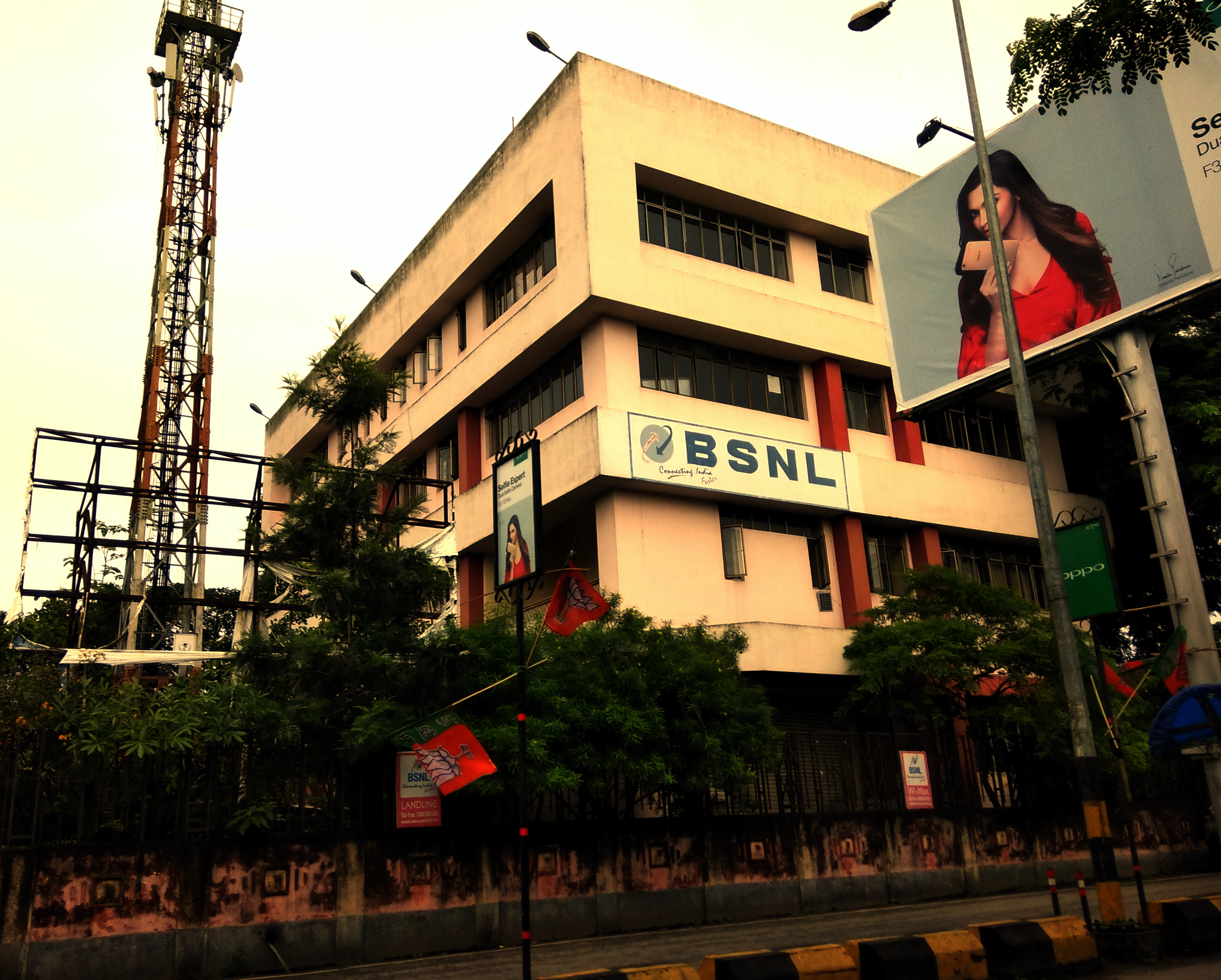
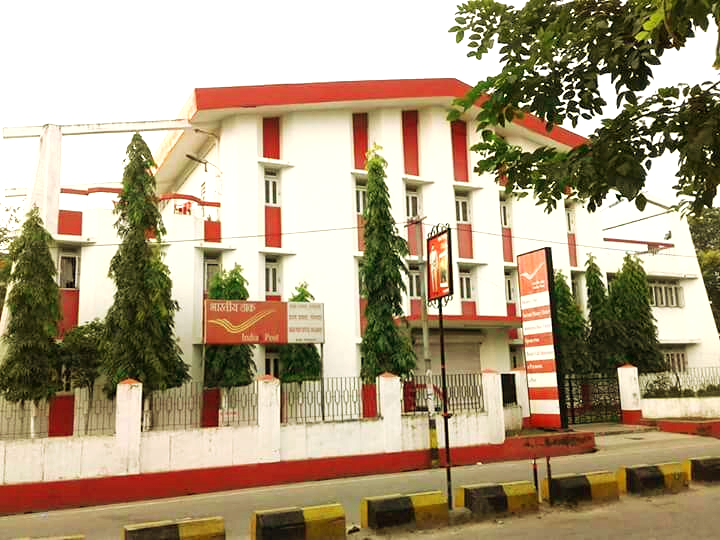
From top left to right:
Aaiferi Enclave (Amolapatty – New), Regional Office – Assam Rural Development Bank (Amolapatty – New), Vishal Mega Mart (Amolapatty – New), Head Post Office (Golaghat Central), BSNL Telephone Exchange – Outdoor Section (Golaghat Central), and Gold Cinema Multiplex Screen (Old Central Jail Market)

=== Local government ===
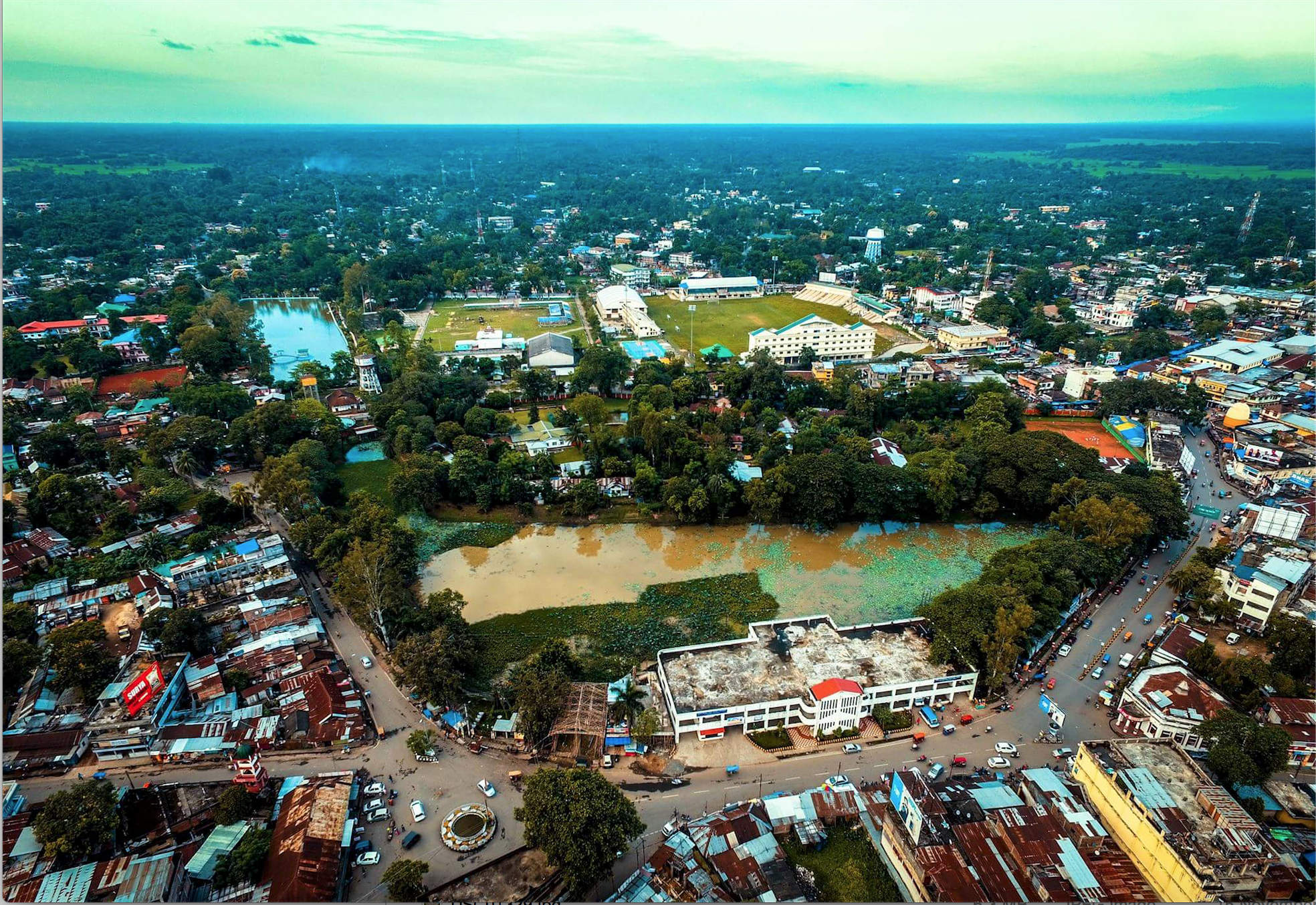
Golaghat – Central (west) skyline

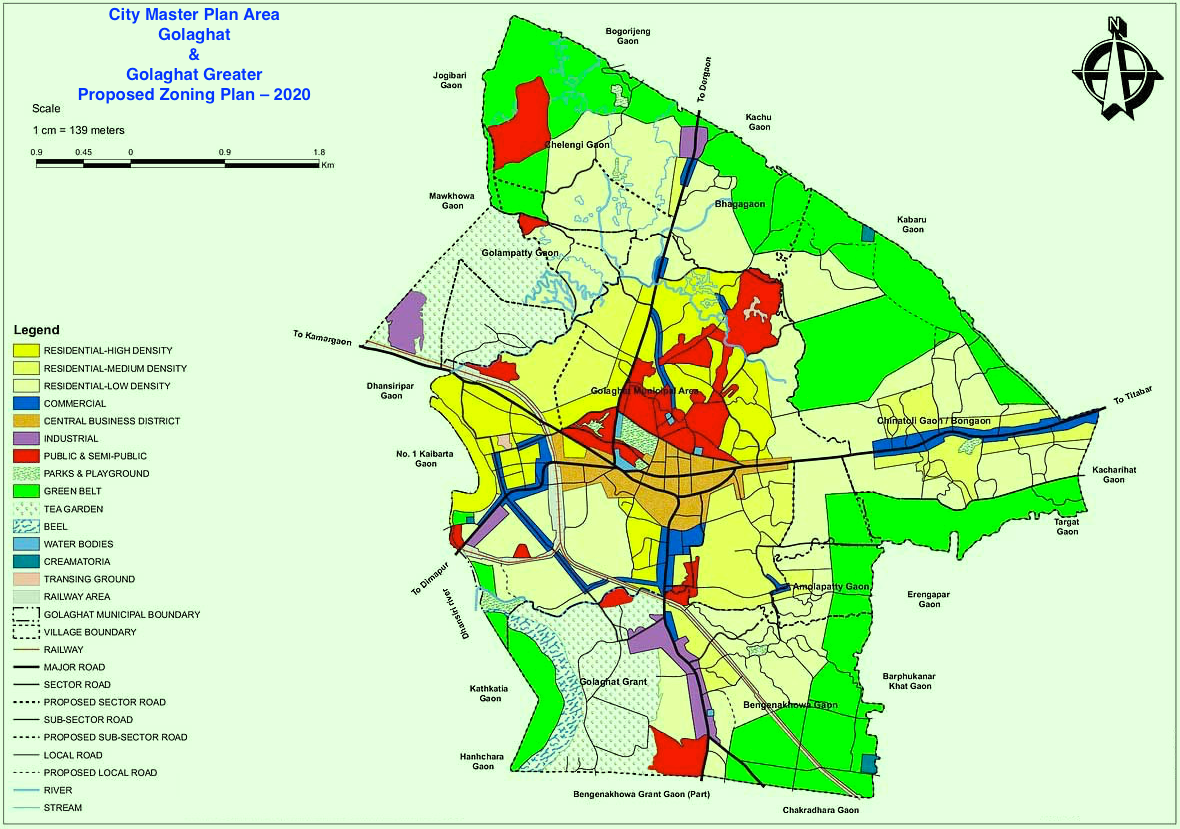
Golaghat master-plan area

The administration of Golaghat is formed of two tiers: a city-wide and a local tier. The city-wide administration is coordinated by the Golaghat Development Authority, while the local administration is carried out by the Golaghat Municipal Board. The development authority functions under the Directorate of Town and Country Planning – Urban Development Department, Government of Assam and is responsible for the implementation of infrastructure projects, besides preparation of master plan for Golaghat urban area to ensure distributed growth. The authority works closely with the municipal board.

The municipal board covers the geographical area of 17 square kilometres (6.6 sq mi) within Golaghat and has the administration over 9,646 houses to which it supplies basic amenities like water and sewerage, besides performing certain obligatory services as a part of the local administration.

The Deputy Commissioner of Golaghat is the executive head and is responsible for law and order, implementation of government schemes, besides being also authorised to hear revenue cases pertaining to the district.

The Chairperson of Golaghat is an elected representative who is accountable for the strategic governance of Golaghat headquarters. The Chairperson directs the elected Ward Commissioners in entirety of Golaghat on various civic matters.

The main functions include, but not limited to the following:

- Strategic planning, including housing, waste management, the environment and production of the Golaghat Master Plan
- Refuse or permit planning permission on strategic grounds
- Transport policy
- Fire and emergency planning, delivered by the functional body Fire & Emergency Services, Assam
- Policing and crime policy
- Economic development, delivered through the functional body Golaghat Development Authority
- Power to create development corporations

=== Neighbourhoods ===
This is a list of the areas of Golaghat, in alphabetical order. In political or administrative usage contemporary areas of Golaghat are informal, often being based on or adapted from historic contexts. For electoral purposes the areas are divided into wards.

The oldest borough in Golaghat is Amolapatty. (Note: Amola, meaning Clerk, Amolapatty, meaning, neighbourhood of clerks, set up in Golaghat, Nowgong and Dibrugarh. Anglicized spelling Omlah or Amlah. Shodhak, Volume 6, Parts 1-3. Bhartiya Pragtisheel Shiksha Parishad. 1977. p. 86. Retrieved 1 December 2019.)

Neighbourhoods
Old
Amolapatty – Old^{†}
Baagicha Ali^{†}
Amolapatty – New^{†}^{‡}
Others
Arengapara^{†}^{‡}
Bengenakhowa^{†}^{‡}
Bet Mahal^{†}^{‡}
Chandan Nagar^{†}
Chanmari^{†}
Geeta Nagar^{†}
Junaki Nagar^{†}
Krishna Nagar^{†}
Maruwaripatty^{†}
Missionpatty^{†}^{‡}
Paltanpatty^{†}
Santipur^{†}
Subhash Colony^{†}
Sreemanta Nagar^{†}
Tapan Nagar^{†}^{‡}
Tenpur^{†}
Suburbs
Moinapara
Narakanwar
Pulibor
Rangajan
^{†} Primarily a residential area.
^{‡} A commercial area.

== Geography ==
=== Scope ===
Golaghat is located at 26.52°N 93.97°E. It has an average elevation of 95 metres (312 feet).

The Golaghat telephone area code (3774) covers a larger area, the entire Golaghat district, while the PINs 785 621 – 785 702 range from Golaghat H.O. (Head Post Office) to other regions, such as the sub–office delivery in Bengenakhowa, branch office in Missionpatty etc.

=== Status ===
Golaghat presently comprises the areas within the jurisdiction of Golaghat Municipal Board, however, the proposed planning covers an extended area of Golaghat Grant and Bengenakhowa Grant, besides the Amolapatty region.

=== Topography ===
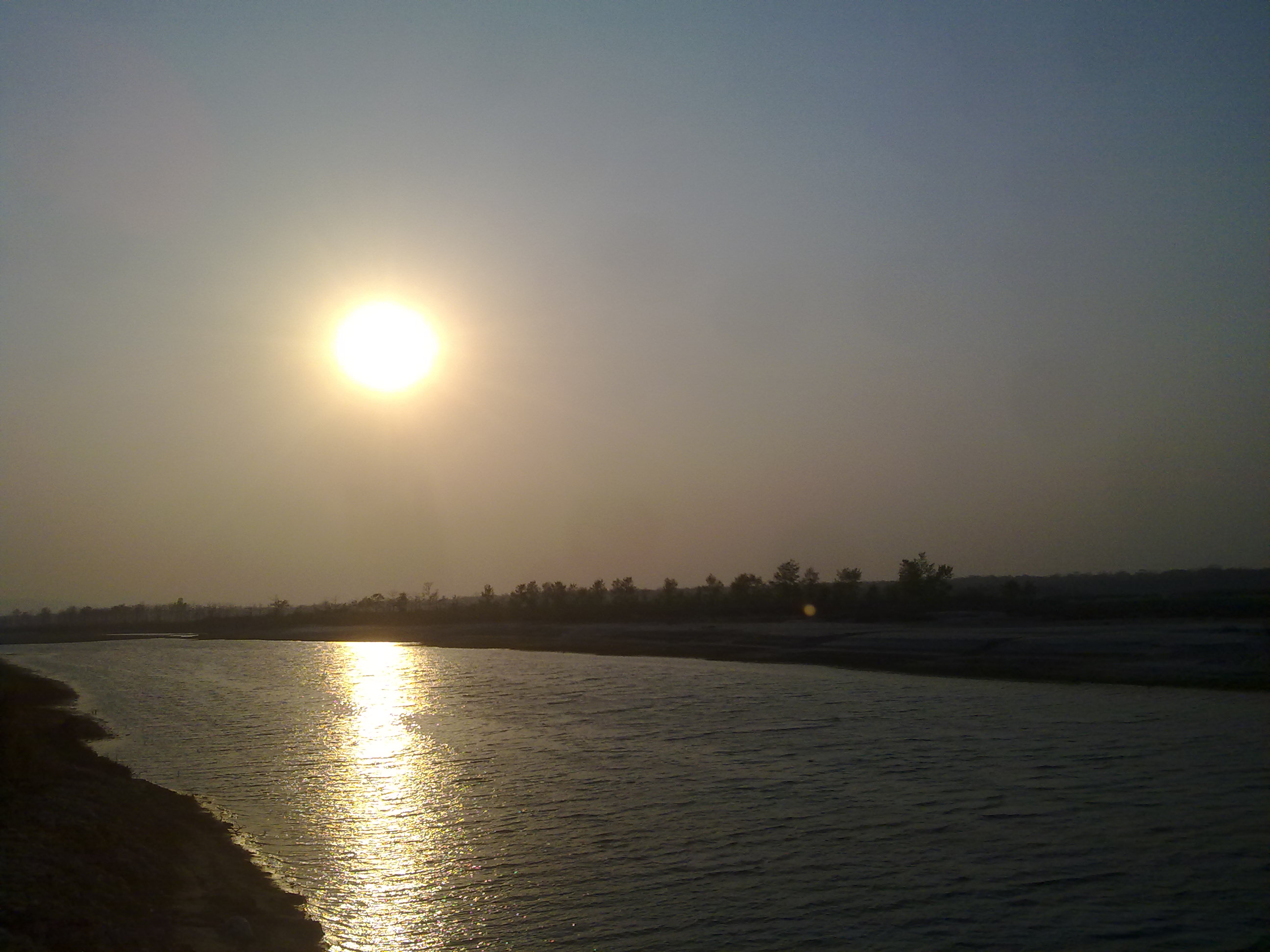
Dhansiri River view

Golaghat encompasses a total area of 17 square kilometres (6.6 sq mi), an area which has a population of ~ 60,000 and a population density of ~ 8,303.55 inhabitants per square kilometre (21,506.1 inhabitants/mi^{2}). Dhansiri River, one of the important tributaries of Brahmaputra River, is the primary geographical feature of Golaghat which is a navigable river and the main factor for the growth of human settlements in the region. The Dhansiri is a tidal river and Golaghat and surrounding areas are vulnerable to flooding.

=== Climate ===
Like most of the hill areas of Northeast India, Golaghat has a subtropical highland climate (Köppen Cwb) characterised by pleasant, dry and sunny winters and warm, humid and very wet summers.

==== Summer ====
The summer season is very warm and usually humid starting from the end of March and continuing until October. Golaghat falls within the temperate region with monsoon-type rainfall prevailing through the year. Summer days typically range from 20 to 24 °C (68.0 to 75.2 °F) but the humidity makes it feel hotter. South–west monsoons that lasts from June to September are responsible for a total average of 1,686 millimetres or 66.38 inches out of an annual total of 2,295 millimetres (90.35 in) of annual rainfall.

==== Winter ====
Winter commences from the month of November with less rainfall and misty mornings and afternoons. By December, afternoon temperatures are a pleasant 16 °C or 60.8 °F and mornings average 8 °C or 46.4 °F.

When compared with winter, the summers have much more rainfall.

Climate data for Golaghat: Statistics from Dibrugarh/Mohanbari weather station (The data for averages are taken from year 2000 to 2012)
Month	Jan	Feb	Mar	Apr	May	Jun	Jul	Aug	Sep	Oct	Nov	Dec	Year
Mean daily maximum °C (°F)	15 (59)	15 (59)	17 (63)	20 (68)	20 (68)	23 (73)	22 (72)	24 (75)	23 (73)	22 (72)	19 (66)	16 (61)	19.7 (67.5)
Mean daily minimum °C (°F)	8 (46)	9 (48)	13 (55)	15 (59)	16 (61)	20 (68)	18 (64)	19 (66)	18 (64)	17 (63)	12 (54)	8 (46)	14.4 (57.9)
Average rainfall mm (inches)	30 (1.2)	54 (2.1)	57 (2.2)	96 (3.8)	210 (8.3)	405 (15.9)	510 (20.1)	360 (14.2)	411 (16.2)	114 (4.5)	21 (0.8)	27 (1.1)	2,295 (90.4)
Average rainy days (≥ 1.0 mm)	6	10	13	17	18	21	24	22	20	11	4	4	170
Source 1:
Source 2:

Although located in one of the environmentally clean regions of India, the recent studies of air pollution levels in Golaghat have suggest poor air quality in the region with harmful air particulate matter levels higher than the standards.

=== Architecture ===
Being one of the oldest municipal regions in Assam, Golaghat has many pre-independence style of bungalows in Assam–type architecture, the design style that has houses with high ceilings and light tin roof and wooden or concrete flooring. However, with time, such characteristic designs are replaced with RCC houses and buildings.

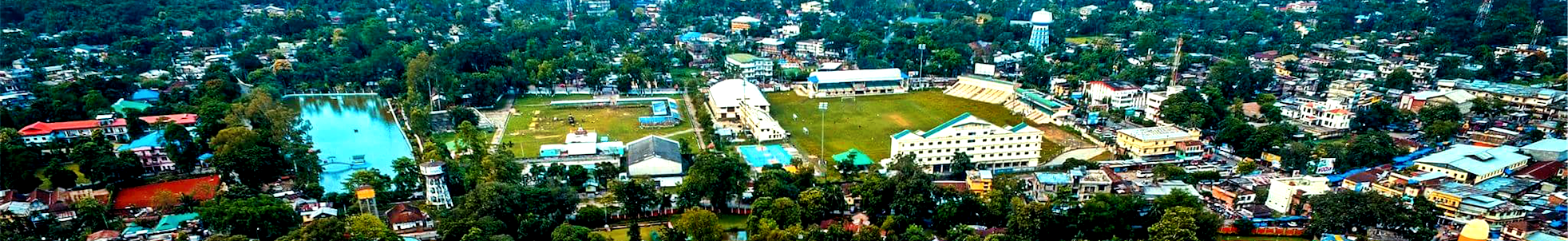
Scenic skyline of Golaghat dominated with trees and bungalows

== Demography ==
Religion in Golaghat (2011 census)
Religion	Percent(%)
Hindu	77.04%
Muslim	19.01%
Christian	1.70%
Sikh	1.34%
Buddhist	0.07%
Jainism	0.39%
Other	0.34%
Undeclared	0.11%

Previously in 2001 Census, Golaghat recorded a population of 33,021, constituting 53 percent males and 47 percent females of the total population, with 11 percent of the population under 6 years of age. The average literacy rate was noted to be 82%, higher than the national average of 59.5 percent, where male literacy stood at 84 percent and female literacy at 79 percent respectively.

In 2011 Census, Golaghat registered the lowest child sex ratio (Note: The sex ratio is the number of females per 1000 males in the population. Sex ratio of population in the age group 0-6.) of 884 females per 1000 males, and the highest percentage of household-industry workers in the district at 4.98 percent. Males recorded a lower percentage than females at 2.57 males and 13.90 percent females respectively. (Note: Distribution of workers by sex in four categories of economic activity in Towns, 2011, page 48 PART A DCHB GOLAGHAT)

The Scheduled Castes and Scheduled Tribes were at 3.69 percent and 1.21 percent i.e., a total of 1,549 and 507 populations respectively (Note: Number and Percentage of Scheduled Castes and Scheduled Tribes Population in Towns 2011, page 36 PART A DCHB GOLAGHAT) and 3979 (Note: Proportion of slum population in towns, 2011, page 54 PART A DCHB GOLAGHAT) to be the total slum population in the city.

The 2001-literacy rate of 82 percent increased to 90.93 percent in 2011, with the highest number of literates in the district, but at the same time, reporting the highest number of illiterates with 7,637 persons. (Note: Number and Percentage of Literates and Illiterates by Sex in Towns, 2011, page 39 PART A DCHB GOLAGHAT)

The largest religious groupings of the census are Hindus (77.04 per cent), and the smallest are undeclared at 0.11 (per cent).

== Economy ==
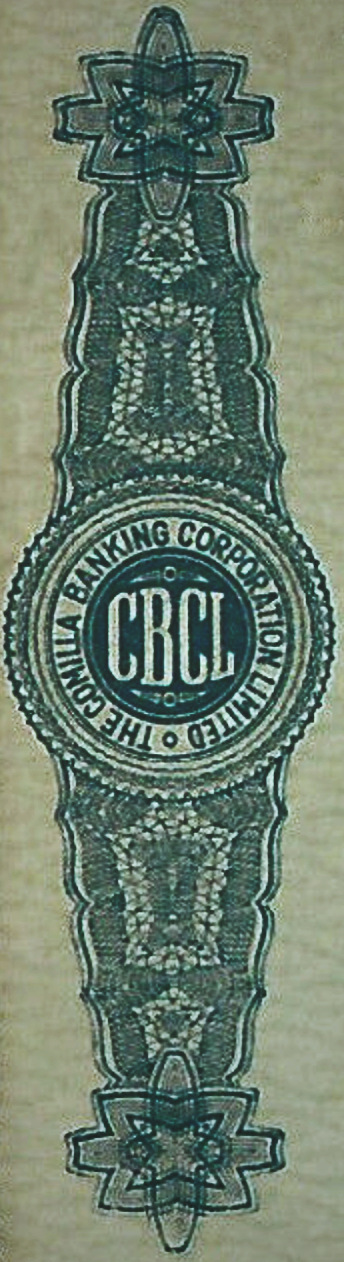
Comilla Banking Corp. Ltd. Golaghat Br. EST^{D} 1937

The modern economy in Golaghat began with a system of organized banking that started in 1926 with a functioning branch of the Gauhati Bank. The years thereafter led to the establishment of other newer banks, namely; the Union Bank, a cooperative bank under the presidency of Debeshwar Rajkhowa in 1930 and the Comilla Banking Corporation Limited in 1937. Later, the merger of Comilla Banking Corporation Limited with Tripura Modern Bank Limited led to the formation of United Bank of India branch in 1950.

Golaghat is an agrarian economy, comprising cultivation of cash crop: tea, besides food crops, such as rice and sugarcane.

=== Tea industry ===
Golaghat has played a significant role in the tea industry of Assam and there is a saying that one can’t make bad tea in the Golaghat belt. The small tea growers' movement was also started from Golaghat. As per the latest statistics, Golaghat has the third highest number of small tea growers (STGs) and third highest number of bought leaf factories (BLFs) in Assam.

The region has sixty three large tea estates with a turnover of twenty thousand tonnes of tea per year. (Note: Economic Profile of Golaghat, page 6 PART A DCHB GOLAGHAT) Small-scale tea growers that are based here have also provided considerable traction to the economy because of large incomes. The Golaghat-based organisation, NETA representing 32 tea producers contributing 75 million kg of tea, has planned to set up tea boutiques for the promotion and easy accessibility of fresh, non-blended authentic tea at reasonable prices to consumers. The Tea Board of India also organises period small tea growers conventions in Golaghat for understanding domestic trade challenges and providing strategic directions for the growth of the economy.

=== Heavy industry ===
The Numaligarh Refinery is the major heavy industry in the region processing three million tonnes of crude oil per year. (Note: Economic Profile of Golaghat, page 6 PART A DCHB GOLAGHAT)

=== International Trade Centre ===
An international trade centre for the regulation and governance of Agarwood cultivation and trade is going to be set up in Golaghat. The centre will assist in the export promotion efforts of Assam's economy by informing on export markets and marketing, besides helping in the development of export promotion services.

== Transport ==
=== Air ===
Jorhat Airport is the nearest airport to Golaghat which is about 37 km from the town. Dimapur Airport is situated about 88 km from Golaghat Town.

=== Rail ===
Golaghat Railway Station is located at Bet Mahal, and the main rail-head is Furkating Junction, about 10 km from the Golaghat municipal area. There are daily and weekly trains running through the Furkating junction to other cities of the country.

=== Roads ===
Golaghat is connected to NH-37 by PHG Path via Dergaon, connected to NH-37 Kamargaon through Dhodar Ali and connected to NH-39 by Golaghat Dimapur road. Three major highway passes through Golaghat District namely NH-37, NH-39 and Dhodar Ali. Golaghat is well connected by roadways to all the cities and towns in Assam. The National Highway 39 starts from Numaligarh and touching Golaghat in south-west corner. A new highway linking Rangajan tiniali with Golaghat town has already been constructed that connects via Pulibor Golaghat towards Dergaon for urbanisation and expansion of town area.

== Healthare and education ==
=== Education ===
Debraj Roy College, Hemo Prova Borbora Girls' College, Golaghat Commerce College, Don Bosco College, Golaghat are full-fledged degree colleges; Reliance Senior Secondary School, Golaghat Jatiya Mahavidyalaya are intermediate-studies' college.

In the fields of legal and engineering studies, Golaghat Law College, Golaghat Engineering College and Golaghat Polytechnic Indian Technical Institute are major centers of education in the region. The Birangana Sati Sadhani Rajyik Vishwavidyalaya was established here in 2021.

=== Healthcare ===
Golaghat Nursing Home, Kushal Konwar Civil Hospital, HGM Nursing Home, GBM Nursing Home, Lifeline Hospital, VK- NRL Hospital. The new Golaghat Medical College and Hospital will help in enhancement of Golaghat healthcare sector and its nearby areas.

=== Primary and secondary education ===
Primary and secondary education in Golaghat are offered by various schools affiliated to one of the boards of education, such as the High School Leaving Certificate (HSLC) of Board of Secondary Education, Assam (SEBA), All India Secondary School Examination (AISSE) of Central Board of Secondary Education (CBSE) and Indian Certificate of Secondary Education (ICSE) of Council for the Indian School Certificate Examination (CISE). Schools in Golaghat are either government-run or are private (both aided and un-aided by the government).

After completing secondary education, teenagers either attend Higher Secondary School Leaving Certificate (HSSLC) through institutions affiliated to Assam Higher Secondary Education Council (AHSEC) or All India Senior Secondary School Examination (AISSSE) affiliated to CBSE or Indian School Certificate (ISC) affiliated to CISCE in one of the three streams – liberal arts or humanities, commerce or sciences with combination electives.

Primary school, such as the Town Model School, established in 1888 is 137–138 years old school in operation, whereas secondary school, such as Bezbaruah Higher Secondary School is over 139–140 years of age functioning since 1886. Sacred Heart School (SHS), set up by catholic missionaries in the year 1952. Kushal Konwar Balya Bhawan (KKBB), Vivekananda Kendra Vidyalaya (VKV), Jawahar Navodaya Vidyalaya (JNV), Gurukul Global Academy, Golaghat Jatiya Vidyalaya, FMR Smart School and Sri Sathya Sai Vidya Vihar are some schools in Golaghat.

== Culture ==
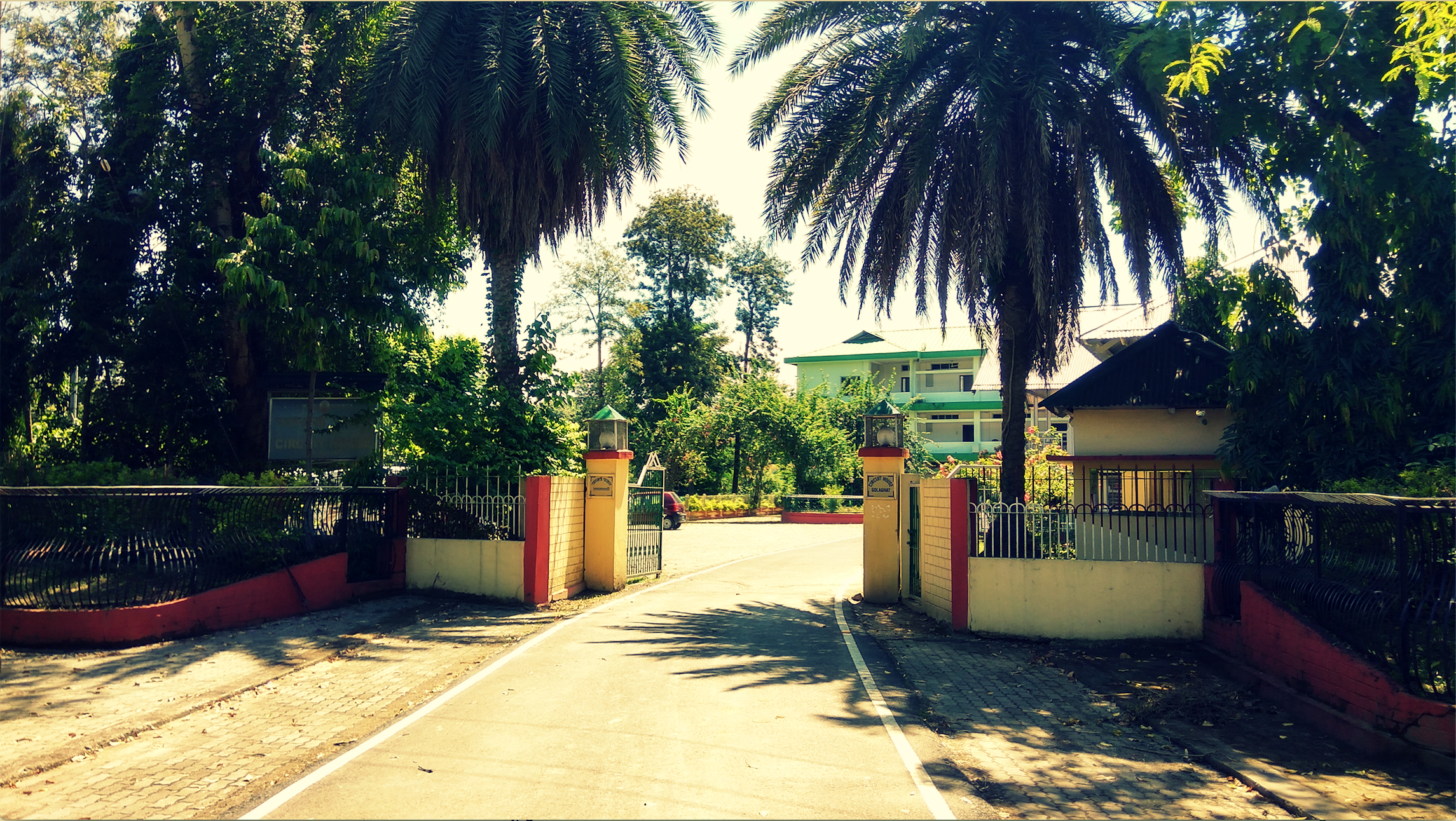
Entrance to Golaghat Circuit House, c. 1900.

=== Leisure and entertainment ===
Golaghat offers required leisure and pleasure trips in and around the region. The place has tea processing units and other old landmarks and resorts, such as the Gymkhana and the Circuit House.

The Assam government has planned to launch the homestay scheme which will include building around sixty homestays to boost tourism in the Golaghat region.

==== Golaghat Gymkhana ====
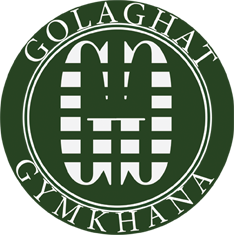
Gy. Monogram

Golaghat Gymkhana is a public/private members' club located on Station Road in Golaghat. Consisting mostly the citizens of Golaghat, it is a heritage bungalow built in 1910 and is a clubhouse. 117–118 years old building had been renovated to convert into a modern clubhouse.

The present–day club, open to all, is equipped with a lounge bar along with a billiard table, a gymnasium and a swimming pool, besides a restaurant.

Although anyone may apply for the membership to avail 'members-only' facilities, such as the gymnasium, applications may be reviewed to make an informed decision.

Golaghat's heritage Gymkhana Club, then the centre of entertainment and merry-making for military personnels, much like Jorhat, was destroyed during the Quit India Movement.

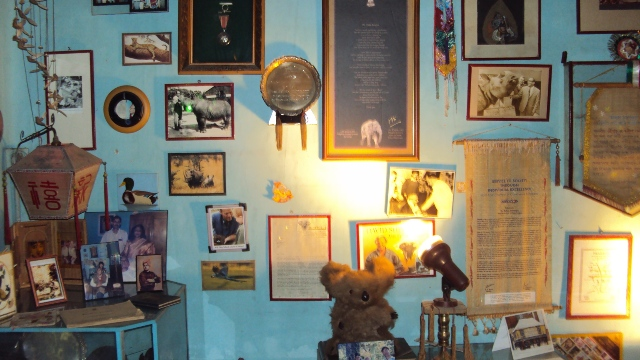
Golaghat Natural History Museum

=== Museum and heritage sites and buildings ===
==== Natural History Museum ====
Natural History (Robin's) Museum is located on Mission Road, and was the former place of residence of late Dr Robin Banerjee, a naturalist of international repute.

Full of artefacts, mementoes, movies and other personal collections of Banerjee's lifetime, the museum showcases 587 dolls and 262 other showpieces which had been presented by admirers and children during his trips to abroad and in the country.

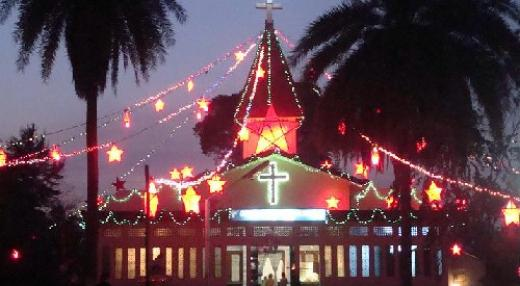
Golaghat Baptist Church

==== Golaghat Baptist Church ====
Golaghat Baptist Church is one of the oldest and biggest Baptist churches in Assam that was established in December 1898, and had celebrated its centenary anniversary in 1999.

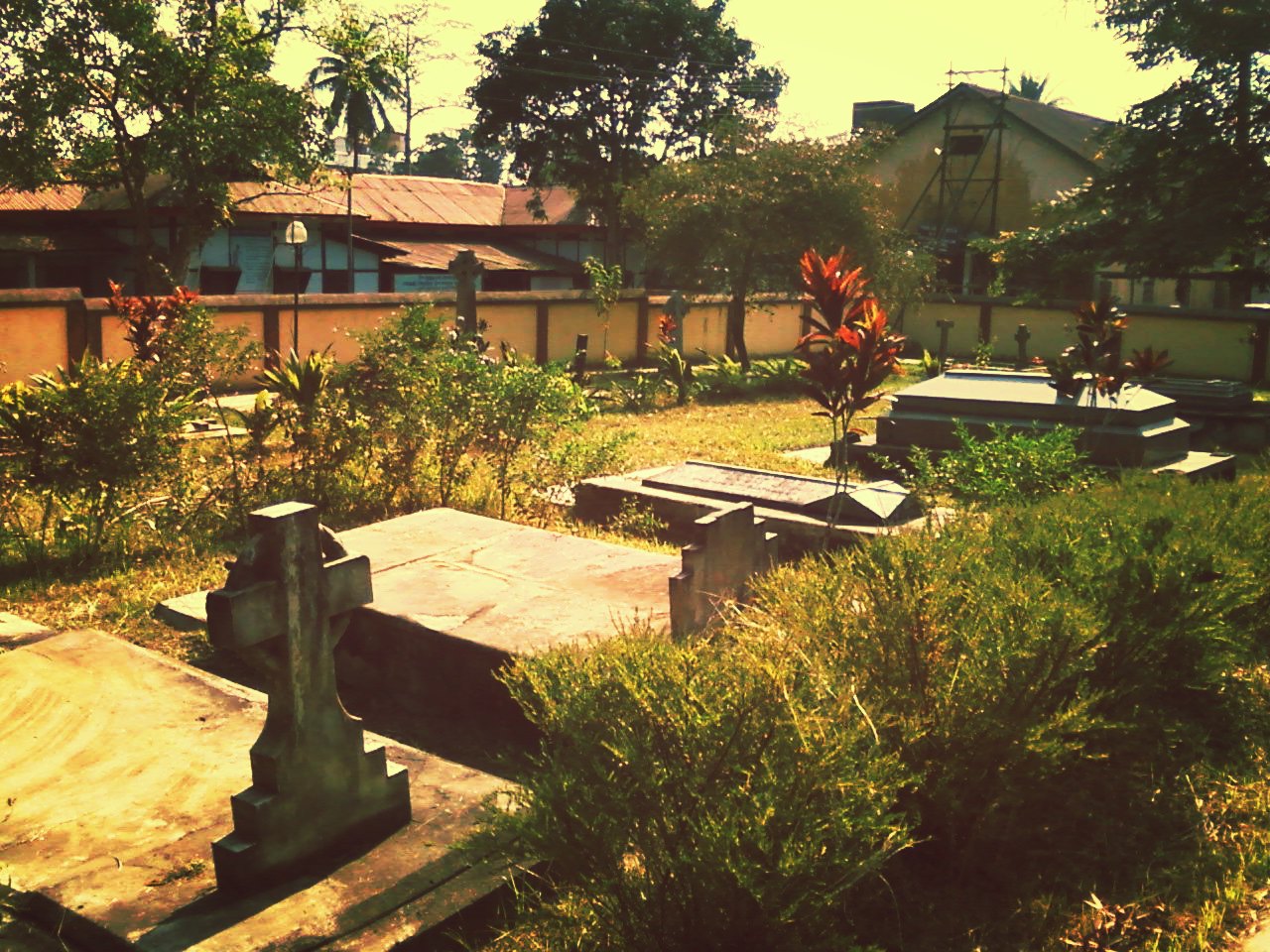
Golaghat British Cemetery

==== Golaghat British Cemetery ====
Golaghat British Cemetery, established in 1876, is located on the premises opposite to Cally Coomar Doss & Co., adjacent to the circle office of Assam Power Distribution Company Limited. It is Assam's one of the oldest burial grounds containing 28 burials of British officers of tea estates and their families and is open for public viewing.

==== Doss & Co. ====
Constructed in 1930 and incorporated 72–73 years ago as Cally Coomar Doss Co. Pvt. Ltd. under the Registrar of Companies (RoC) – Shillong in the year 1955, located at Krishna Building, the Golaghat Doss & Co. is the oldest Department Store, and the largest during that time, that was established before India's independence from Britain.

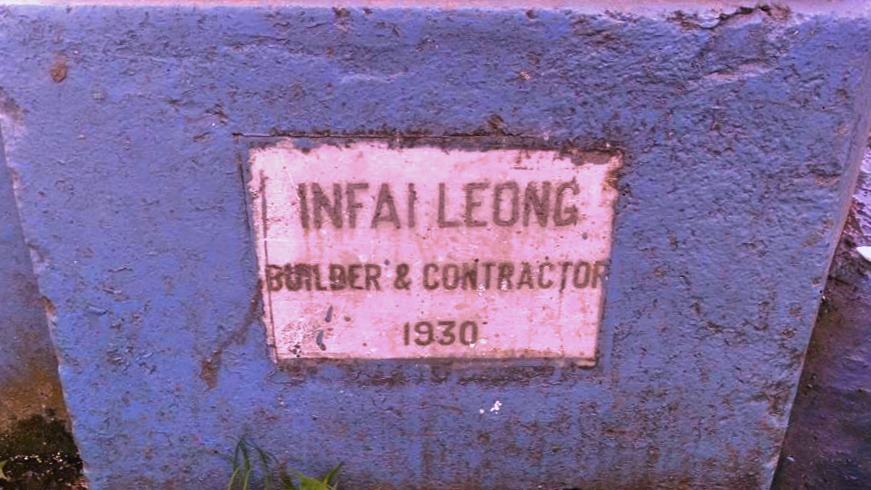
CIRCA sign Doss & Co.

The general merchants' store belonging to entity of company with limited shareholders and an authorised capital of ₹500,000 and paid–up capital of ₹210,000, still stands to this day, trading in the same building at the heart of the city centre, having many divisions comprising home appliances, electronics, and additionally select other lines of products such as paint, hardware, toiletries, cosmetics, photographic equipment, jewellery, toys, and sporting goods, among others.

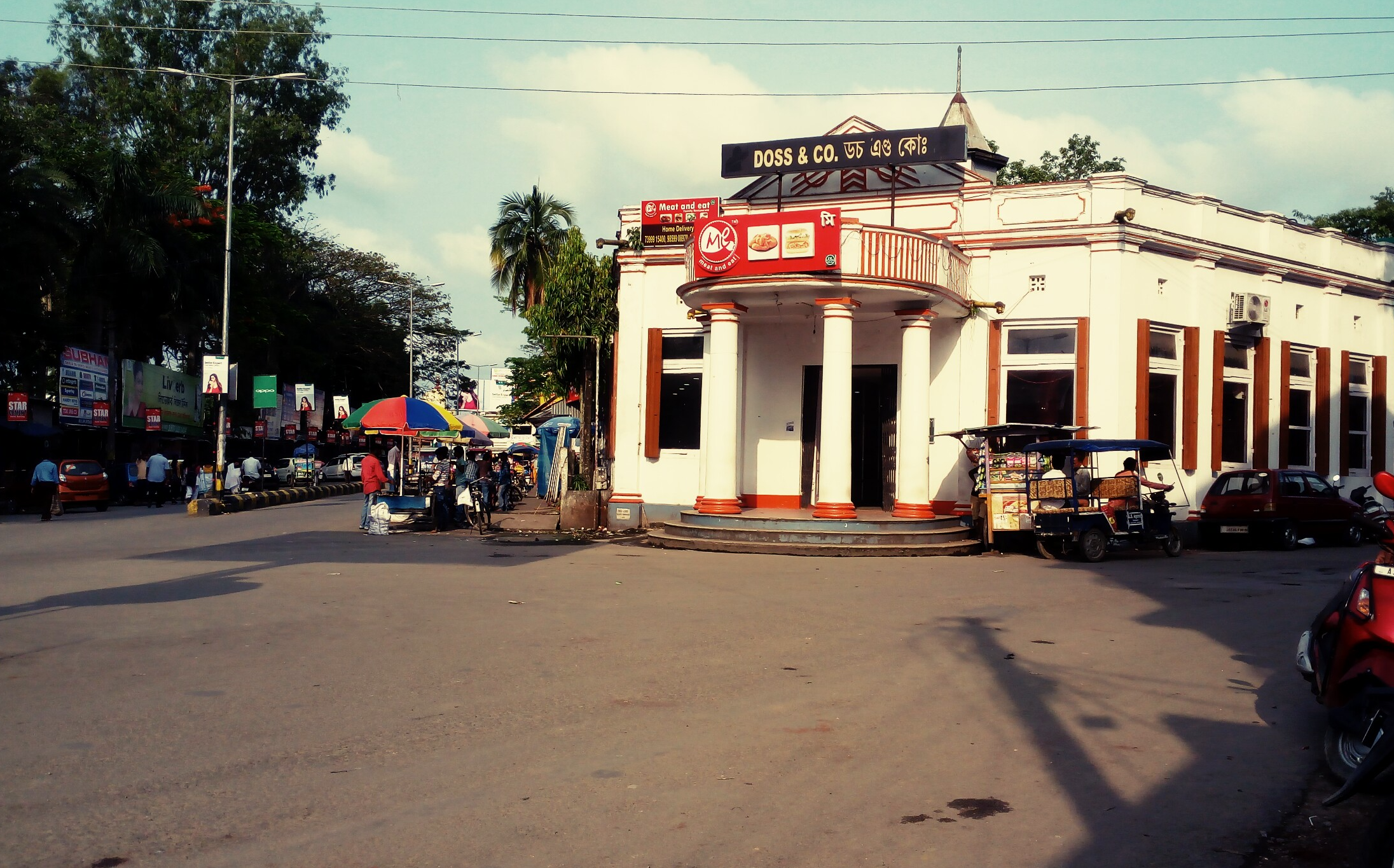
Doss & Co.

Having built long ago, and reckoned as the earliest department store in the organised retail space, and with a legacy of sixty plus years in the state of Assam, the store is one of the recommended places for tourists in Golaghat, and has an official Assam Travel Guide entry, issued and published by Assam Tourism under the Joint Secretary Finance of Tourism Departments, Assam Secretariat.

Two years later, a second branch of this store was opened in Jorhat in the year 1957. The company was incorporated on 1 March 1957 under the name of Jorhat Doss Co. Pvt. Ltd. marked by Registrar of Companies (RoC) – Shillong .

The two stores with an age difference of two years, and with the assigned registration numbers of 1063 and 1086 respectively, laid the first foundations of department stores in the region, establishing Doss & Co. – Golaghat as the thousand sixty–third and Doss & Co. – Jorhat, the thousand eighty–sixth, limited companies in Assam to be listed under the category of Trading as the principal business activity based on the classification of registered companies by the Ministry of Corporate Affairs, Government of India.

==== Deopahar ruins ====
A historical spot that has one of the finest sculptures of the pre-Ahom period. An important archaeological site in the state, located on the hills amidst the tropical forests, consisting the ruins of an ancient temple, and a vast range of sculptured stone blocks of pre-Cambrian rocks – the architectural style is of the later Gupta-era.

The archaeological site, situated in Numaligarh, is a protected by the Directorate of Archaeology, Government of Assam, India.

The site is atop a hillock called by the same name by the side of the National Highway 39. The hillock is a part of a forest reserve.

=== Music and art ===
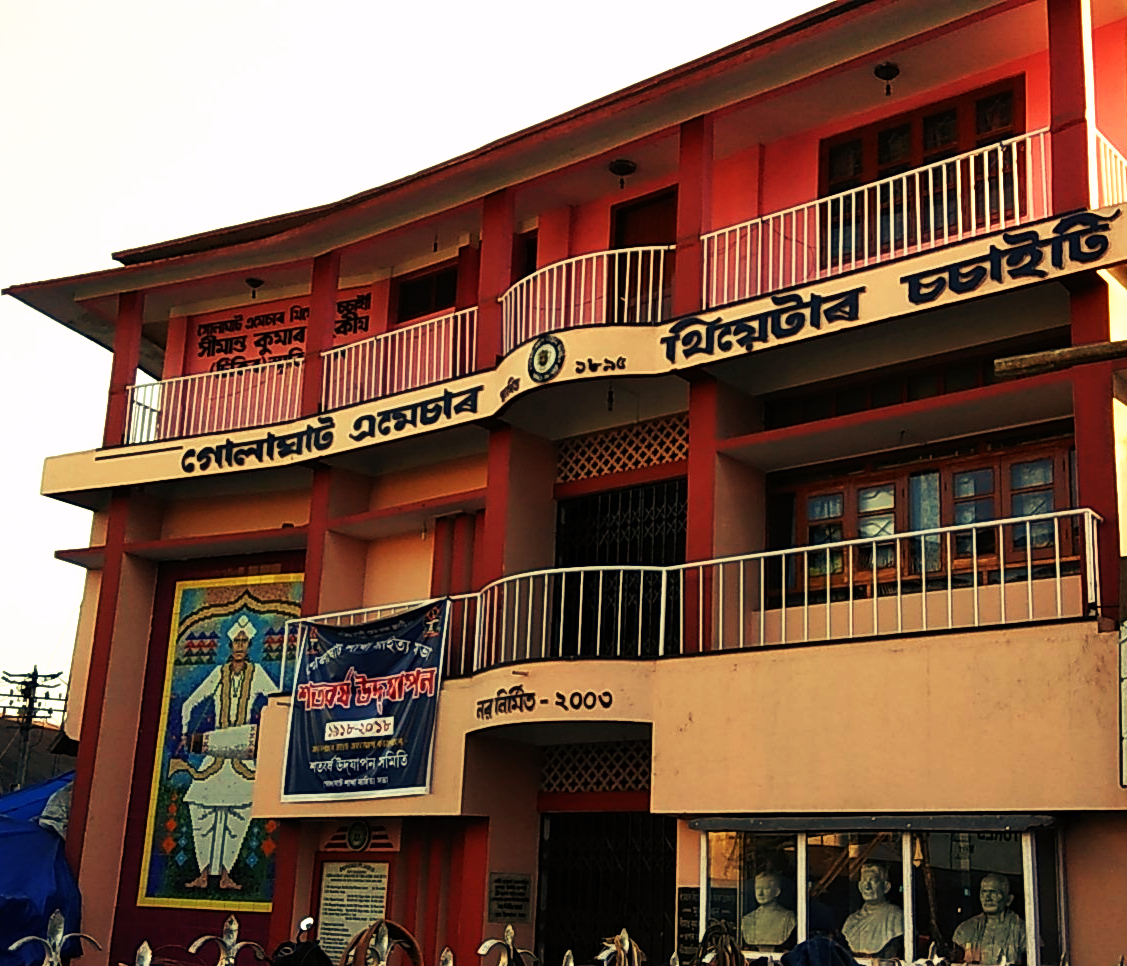
Façade of GATS

Golaghat exerts a considerable impact upon the arts, music, education, entertainment of the region. It houses some of the oldest institutions of performing arts, and has produced many Assamese film directors and producers, such as Munin Baruah and Tapobrata Barua.

Defunct picture houses in Golaghat

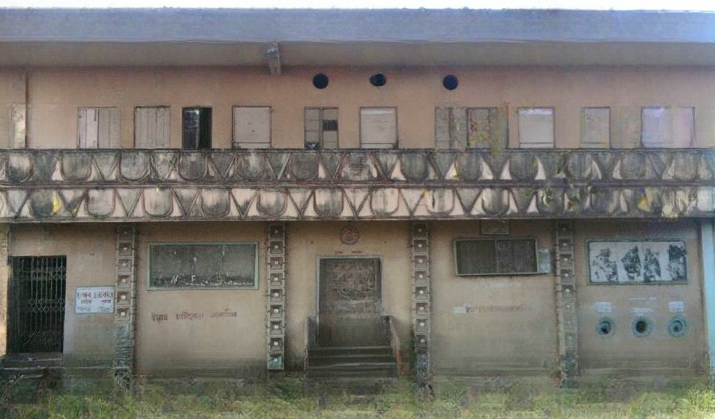
Urvashi Picture House Bengenakhowa – Golaghat (abandoned)

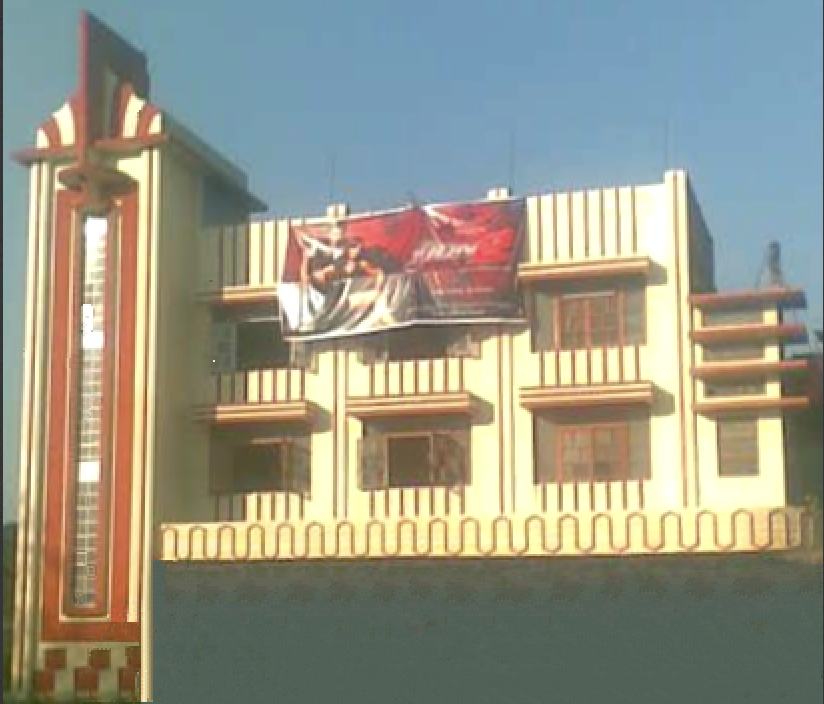
Chitralekha Picture House
Greater Arengapara – Golaghat (demolished)

Golaghat was home to early film houses, projecting celluloid prints for viewing films, such as the Uravashi and the Chitralekha picture houses. However, with the advent of multiplexes, these have now been either closed or demolished.

==== Golaghat Amateur Theatre Society ====
Golaghat Amateur Theatre Society (GATS), established in 1895, is the oldest theatre society in Assam having its own auditorium. Most of the seminars, conferences, theatres, including experimental theatres, meetings and other workshops in the city are organised and conducted by GATS.

==== Ajanta Kala Mandal ====
Established in 1951, the Ajanta Kala Mandal (Ajanta Arts Society) is one of the oldest centres of teaching and propagation of Sattriya – the classical dance form of Assam. Set up by Pradeep Chaliha, a trained and renowned dancer of Assam and an honorary D.Litt. title holder from Dibrugarh University, the Ajanta Kala Mandal has trained numerous classical dancers of Assam since its inception, including internationally acclaimed Sattriya dancer, Indira P.P. Bora. The institute continues to train dancers and organizes various cultural workshops for the promotion of arts and culture in Golaghat, and greater Assam.

==== Sadhani Kalakshetra ====
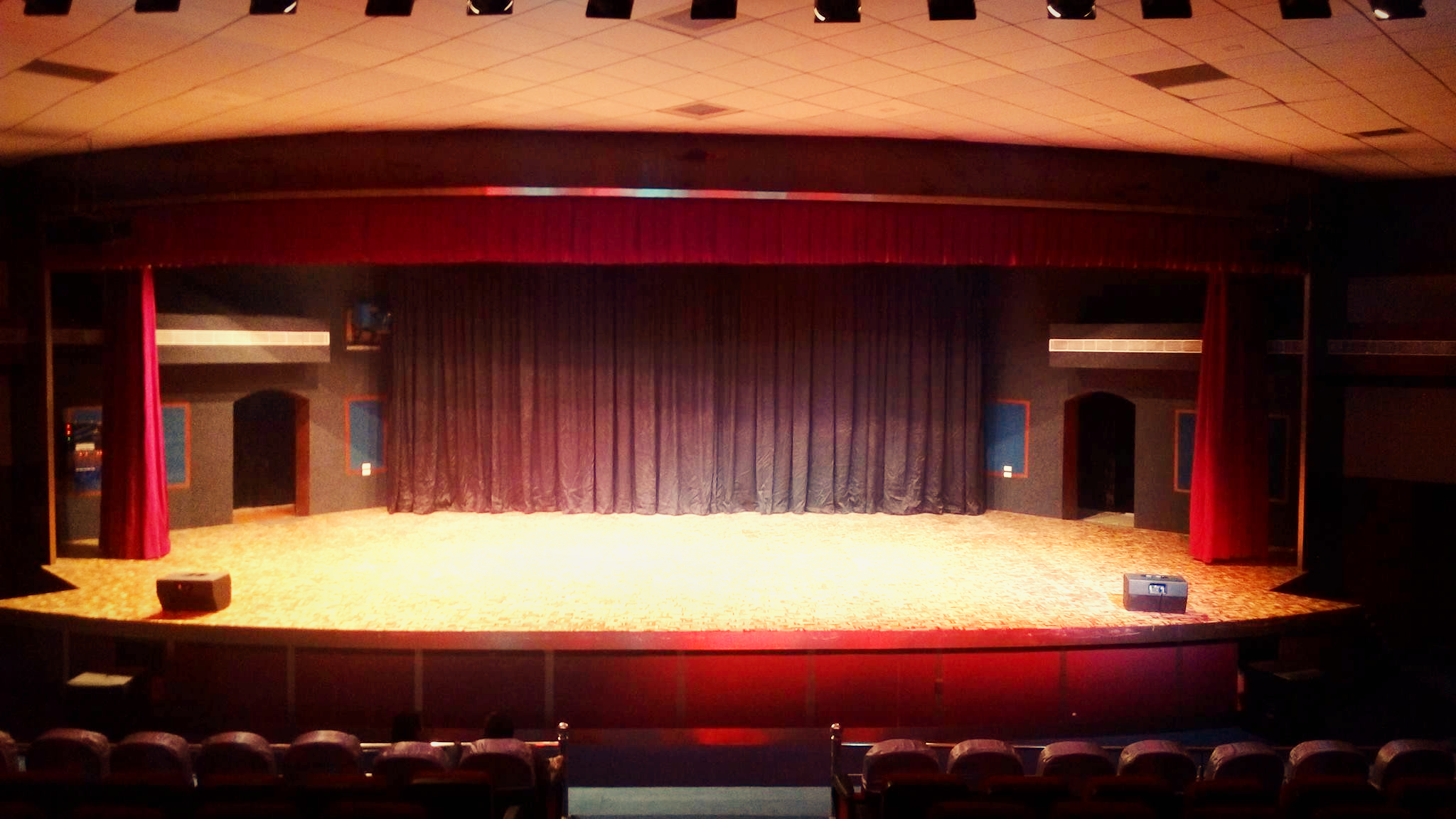
Queen's Arts & Cultural Complex (view from galleries)

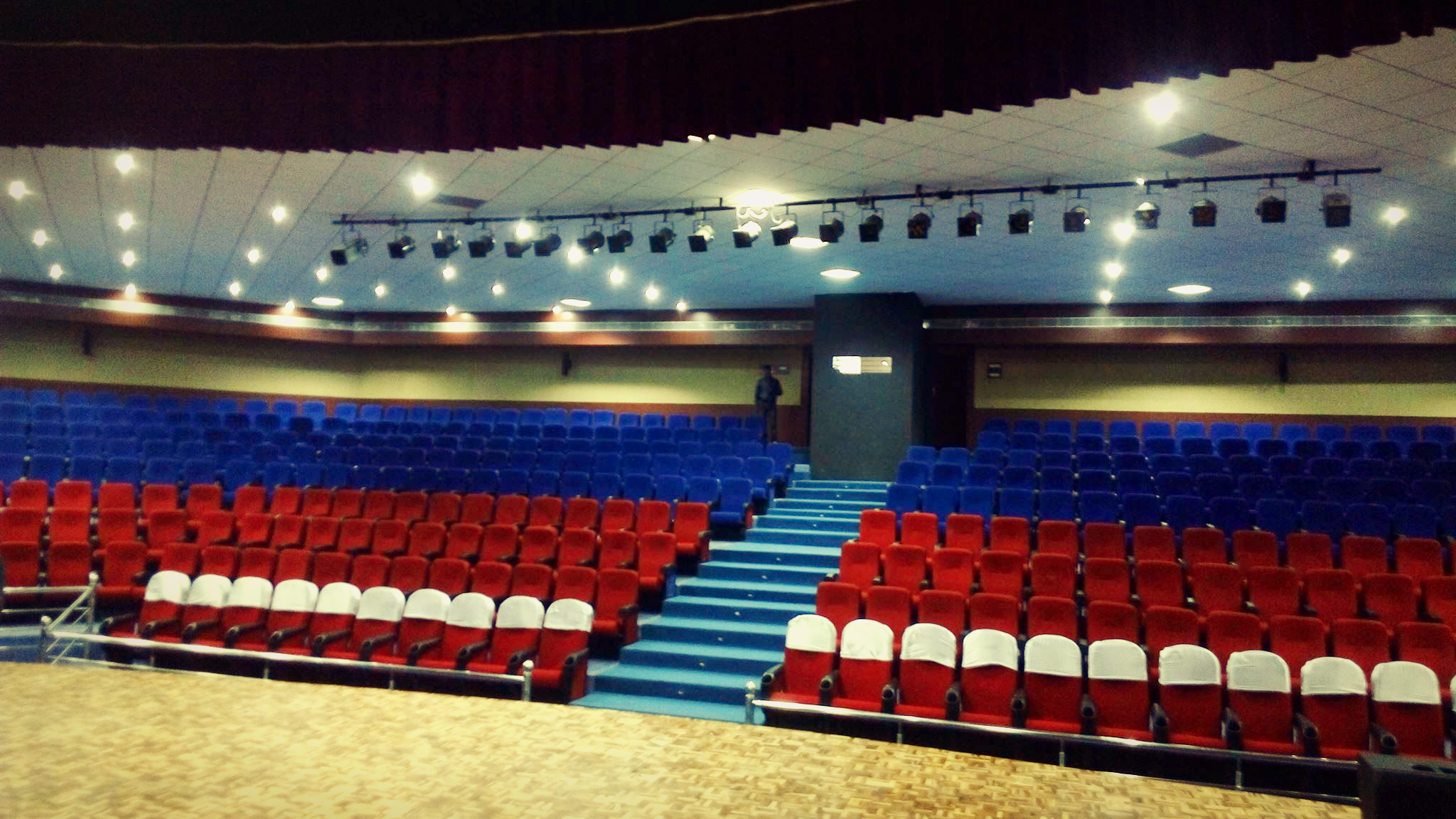
Queen's Arts & Cultural Complex (view from stage)

Sadhani Kalakshetra (Queen's Arts & Cultural Complex), a cultural center located near Tenpur suburb in the Narakanwar region of Golaghat is a leading modern cultural centre in Upper – Assam. Spread over ~ 10 acres of land, it includes an air-conditioned auditorium, a tourist lodge, boating facility, an amusement park and restaurants. and is named after Sati Sadhani, the last queen of the Sutiya dynasty. The centre supports and encourages the creative expression of the indigenous cultures of Assam, enabling the Assamese society to promote presentations on drama, music, dance, and arts and crafts, many of which having origins in Assam.

Designed and developed by Government of Assam, the cultural complex is set up with the specific mission to create, preserve, promote and educate about the passion and dedication of Sati Sadhani.

== Recreation ==
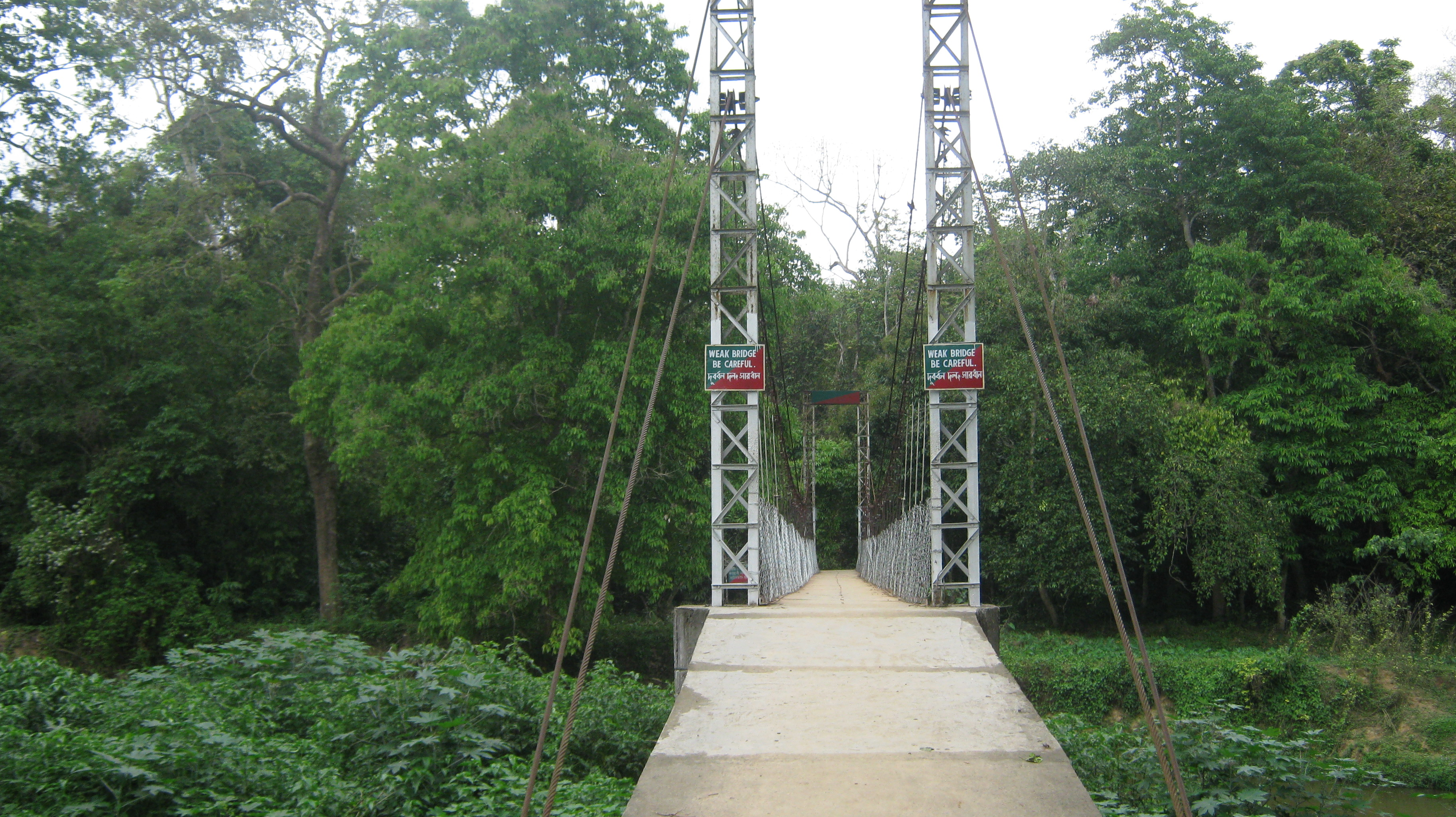
Garampani Hanging Bridge, Golaghat

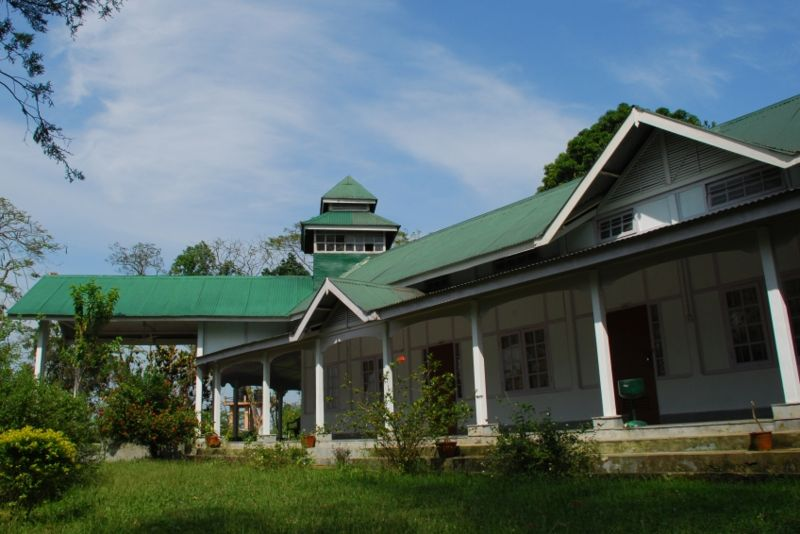
Homestay at Kaziranga, Golaghat

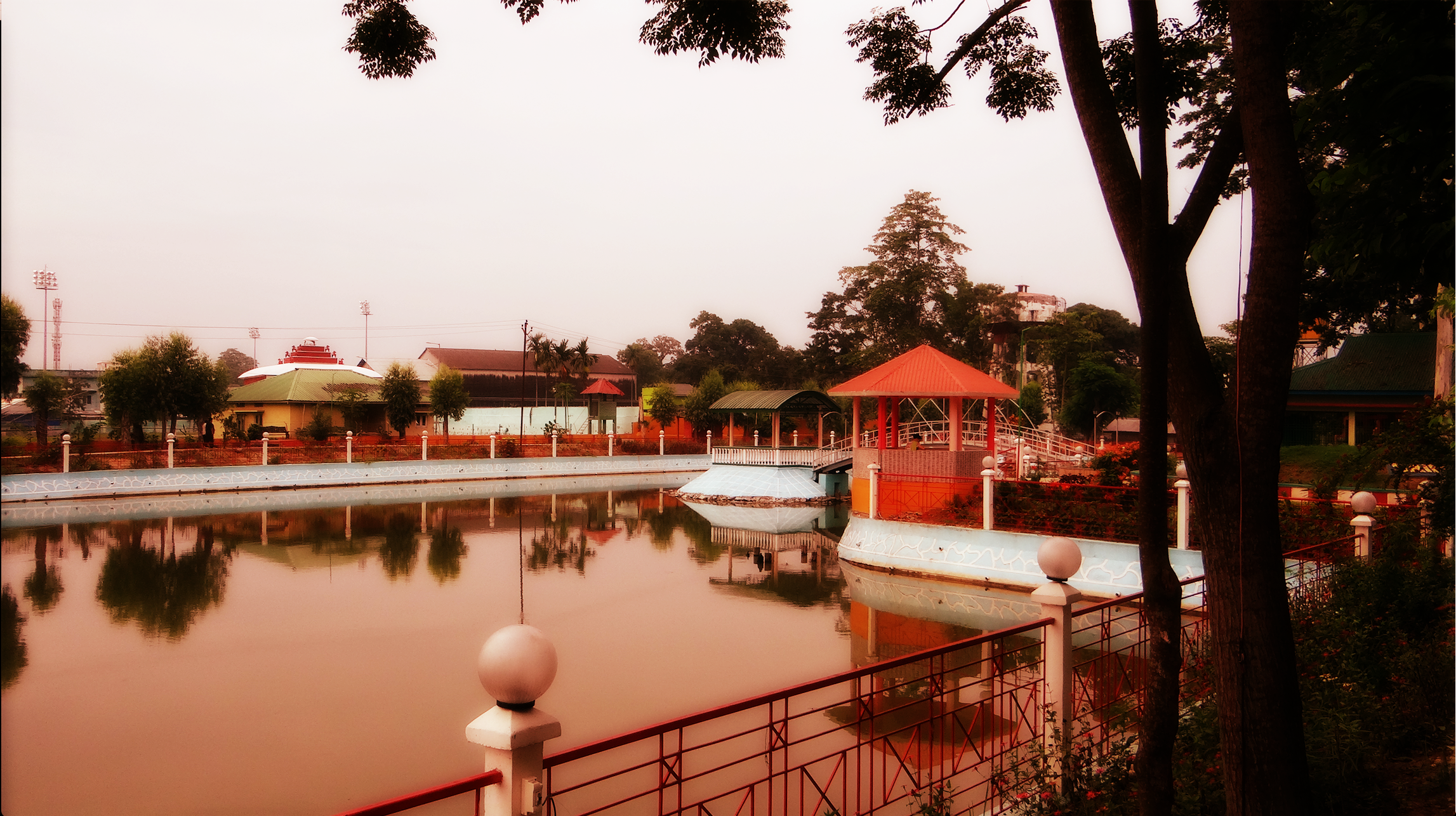
Jamuna Boating Park, Golaghat

=== Parks and open spaces ===
==== Garampani Wildlife Sanctuary ====
Garampani Wildlife Sanctuary is a 6.05-square-kilometre (2.34 sq mi) wildlife sanctuary which is 25 km (16 mi) away from Golaghat. It is one of the oldest sanctuaries containing hot-water spring and waterfall, and surrounded is by Nambor Sanctuary having 51 rare species of orchid.

==== Kaziranga National Park ====
Kazirônga National Park is a World Heritage Site that hosts two-thirds of the world's great one-horned rhinoceroses. It has the highest density of tigers among protected areas in the world and was declared a tiger reserve in 2006. The park is home to large breeding populations of elephants, wild water buffalo, and swamp deer. Kaziranga is recognized as an important birds' area by BirdLife International for the conservation of avi-faunal species. Located on the edge of the Eastern Himalaya biodiversity hot-spot, the park combines high species diversity and visibility. It is a vast expanse of tall elephant grass, marshland, and dense tropical moist broadleaf forests, criss-crossed by four major rivers, including the Brahmaputra, and the park includes numerous small bodies of water. The park celebrated its centennial in 2005 after its establishment in 1905 as a reserve forest.

==== Nambor – Doigrung Wildlife Sanctuary ====
Nambor – Doigrung Wildlife Sanctuary, spreading across 97 square kilometres (37 sq mi) in 3 blocks, it is located in Morangi, Golaghat, and a popular spot for hot water spring and wildlife viewpoints for spotting Rhinos and other animals.

=== Walking ===
==== Dhansiri river bank ====
A walk down the Dhansiri bridge offers a sight of the river. It is a popular picnic spot for the citizens of Golaghat and others alike.

==== Jamuna boating park ====
A public boating park within the city with slow-boating facility for the citizens and tourists. It also has a jogging track with swings and dedicated playing area for children.

==== Jamuna botanical reserve ====
A reserved area adjacent to the boating park for the conservation of flora and fauna plantations. It is not open for public boating and has a recorded history of rich and exotic species of biological plant and animal species.

==== Japixôjia lake ====
The lake is about 30 minutes drive from central Golaghat and is a scenic spot with lush tea gardens lining the borders of the vast expanses of water. Visited by many migratory birds, it is also home to various all-seasons birds.

=== Melamora Eco Tea Tourism ===
Melamora Eco Tea Tourism is located about 15 km from Golaghat Town. Melamora tea tourism centre is covered by green surroundings and is covered by hundred bighas of land. It has a children park with various recreational activities and is a place for various migratory birds. Melamora beel has boating facility and is being managed by women of the locality.

== Sport ==
Golaghat has hosted several national and regional sporting events, including major tennis tournaments, and is home to Assam’s only Sports Authority of India (SAI) Sports Training Centre outside Guwahati.

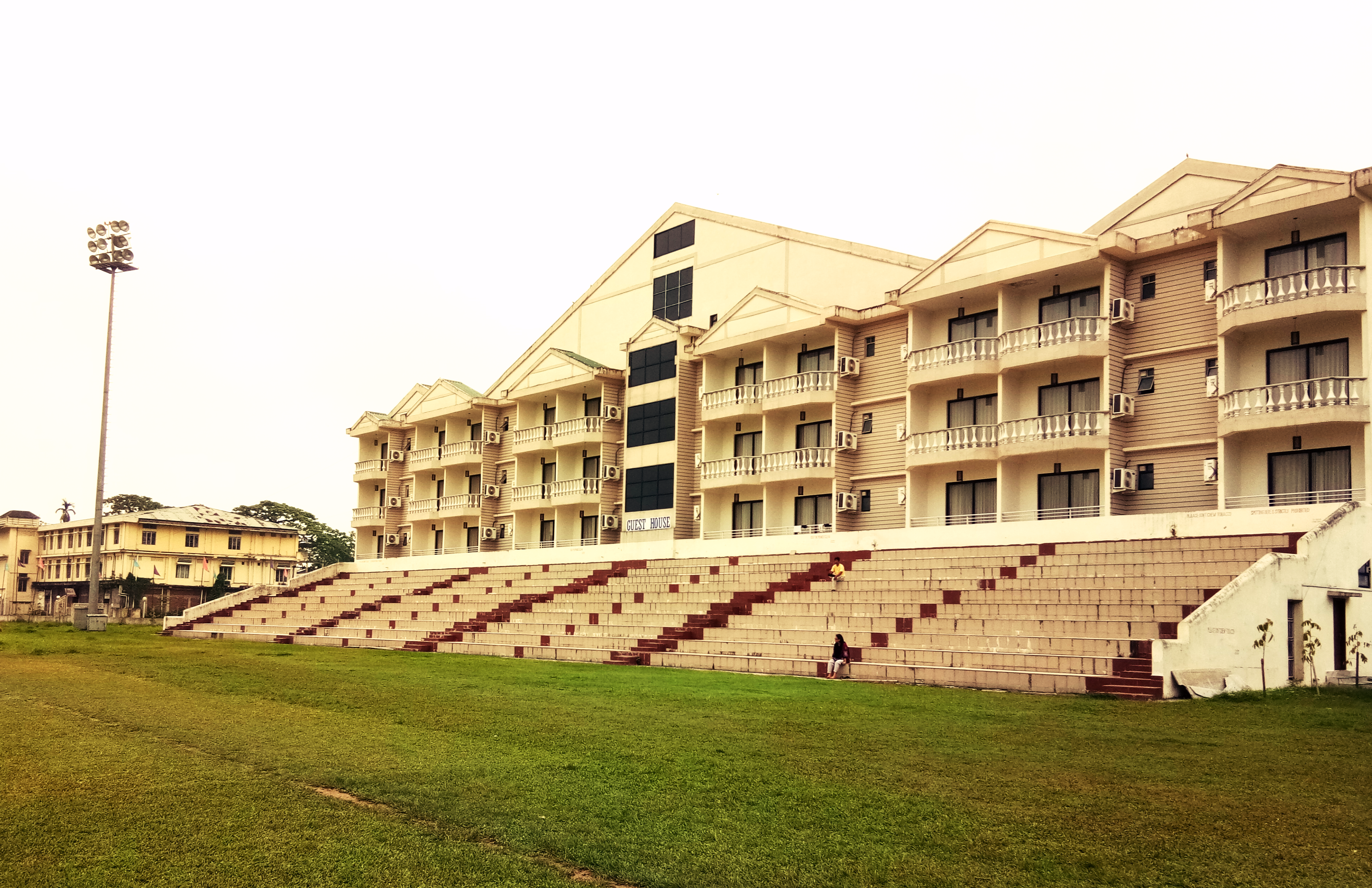
GDSA – Golaghat District Sports Association

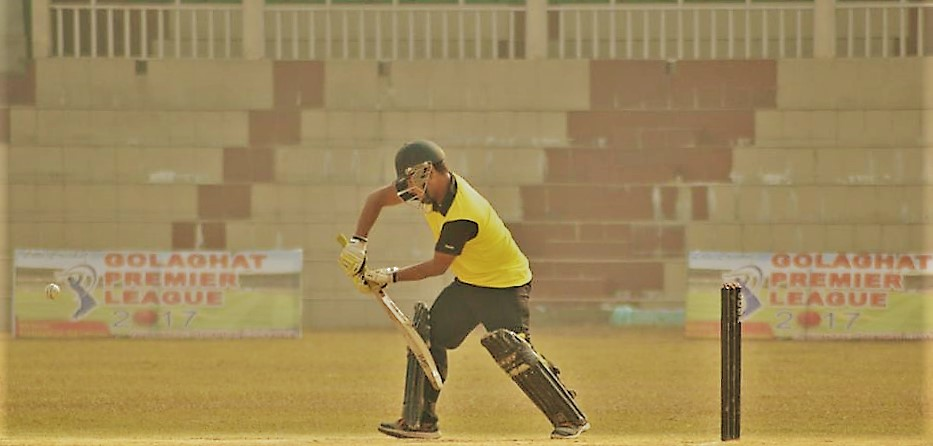
Golaghat Premier League Cricket Tournament

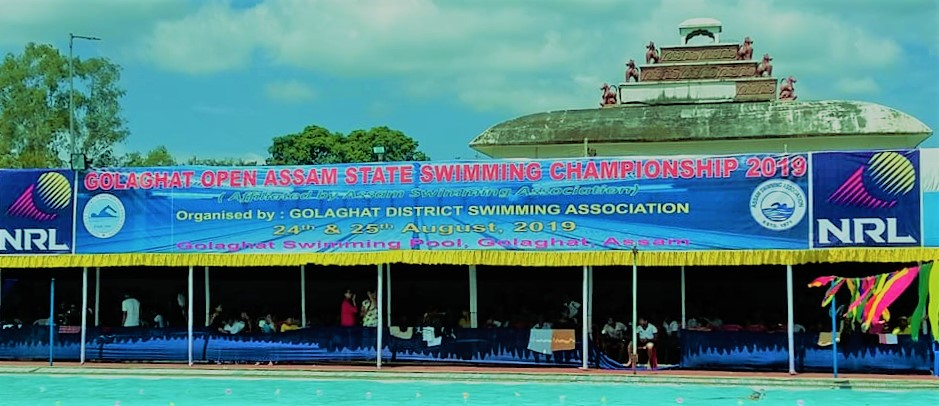
Golaghat 2019 Swimming Championship

Golaghat District Sports Association (GDSA) is the district's apex sports body, responsible for promoting, organising, regulating and developing sports across the city and district through its affiliated associations and clubs.

- Golaghat Stadium: A multi-sport complex featuring a cricket pitch, basketball court, two boxing rings and a football ground. Its galleries accommodate around 4,000 spectators. It also houses a twin-crease indoor cricket practice facility built using materials imported from Australia.
- Indoor stadium: A modern indoor facility equipped for badminton and table tennis. with modern amenities.
- Swimming club: Provides swimming training for learners of all age groups.
- Boxing club: The main centre for boxing events in the city.
- Golaghat Tennis Club (GTC): One of Assam’s oldest sport clubs, featuring two tennis courts, qualified coaches, modern infrastructure facilities, including floodlights. It has regularly hosted championships and AITA tournaments since 1987.
- Golaghat District Carrom Association (GDCA): the platform for the carrom players of the district.
- Golaghat Rhino FC: a locally based professional football club competed in the Assam State Premier League, the top division state football competition for two seasons.

== Politics ==
The politics of Golaghat forms the major part of the wider politics of Assam. Golaghat was, and still is, an area of political and geographical importance and continues to provide the resources and the environment with the dignity and the political self-consciousness appropriate to a state capital.

=== Formation of AGP ===
Golaghat is the birthplace of Assamese Political Renaissance, where the historic Golaghat Convention led to the formation of Assam's first major political party – AGP (Assam Gana Parishad).

AGP was a result of six-year's Assam Movement against illegal infiltration of foreigners from Bangladesh into Assam, led by All Assam Students Union (AASU). The long agitation ended with the signing of the Assam Accord on the independence day in 1985. The leaders of the Assam Agitation formed the AGP on 14 October 1985, in Golaghat and the party later that year overthrew the Indian National Congress led by late Hiteswar Saikia.

Golaghat is a part of Kaliabor (Lok Sabha constituency). BJP's Ajanta Neog is the current MLA of Golaghat (Vidhan Sabha constituency).

== Notable people ==
Image	Name	Notes
	Aideu Handique	Assamese movie actress.
	Ajanta Neog	Politician.
	Atul Bora	Politician.
	Chandradhar Barua	Writer, poet.
	Debo Prasad Barooah	Academician, historian, ex-vice chancellor Gauhati University.
	Gunaram Khanikar	Herbal medicines expert.
	Hemchandra Goswami	Writer, poet, historian, teacher and linguist.
	Hiren Gohain	Literary critic, social scientist.
	Kushal Konwar	Indian independence activist.
	Lovlina Borgohain	Boxer, Olympic Bronze medalist.
	Munin Barua	Assamese film director.
	Nagen Saikia	Writer.
	Nilmani Phookan	Writer, poet.
	Robin Banerjee	Padma Shri awardee, wildlife expert, environmentalist, painter, photographer and documentary filmmaker.
	Syed Abdul Malik	Writer.

== Gallery ==
Important landmarks of Golaghat

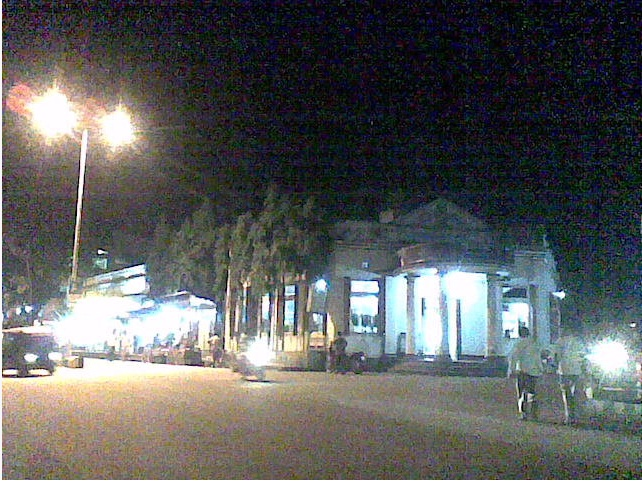
Doss & Co., CIRCA 1930

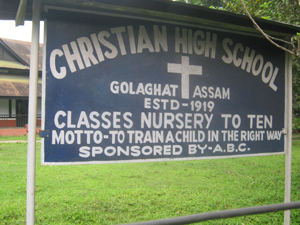
Christian High School, EST^{D} 1919

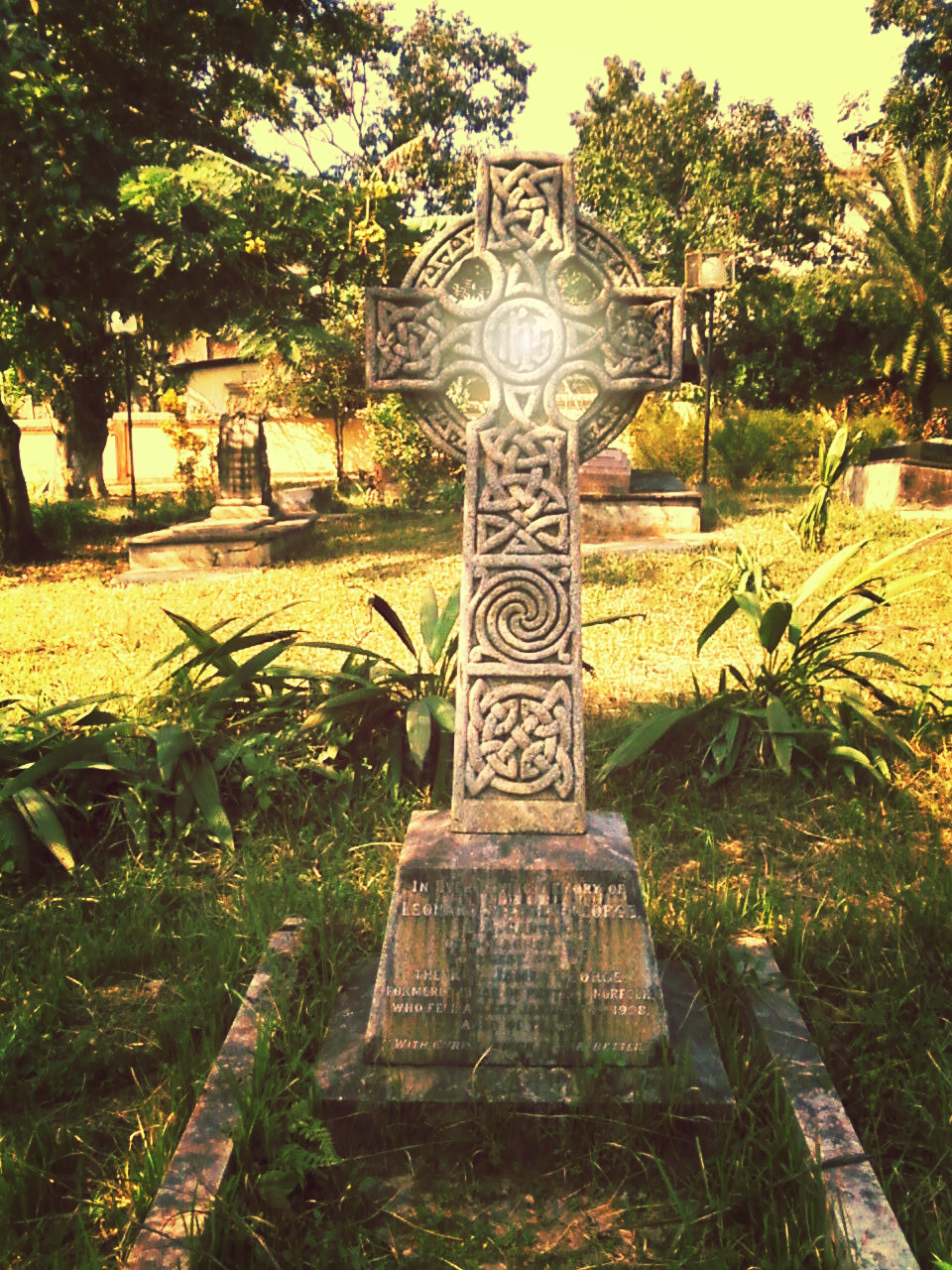
British Cemetery, EST^{D} 1876

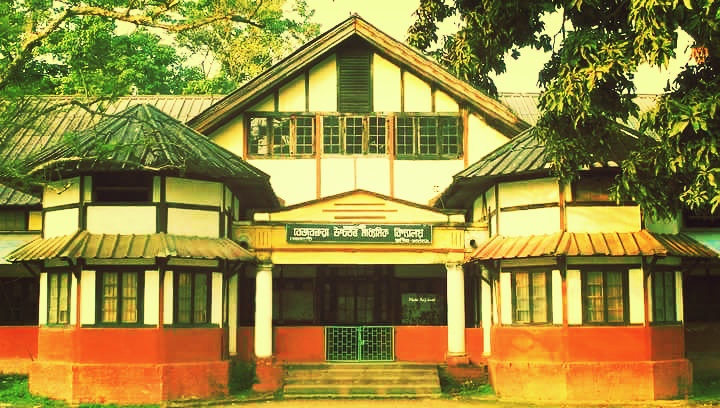
Bezbaruah H.S. School, EST^{D} 1886

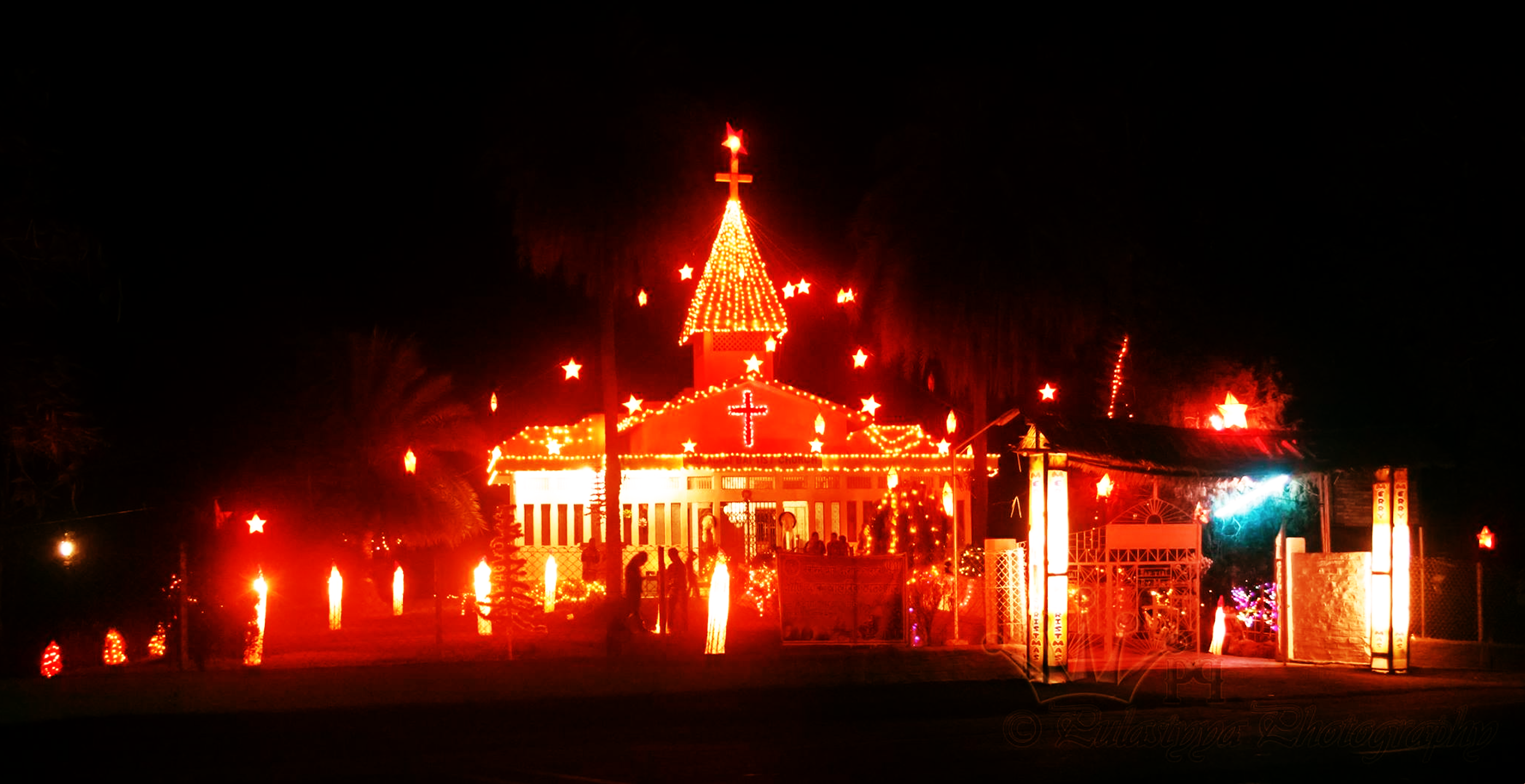
Baptist Church, EST^{D} 1898

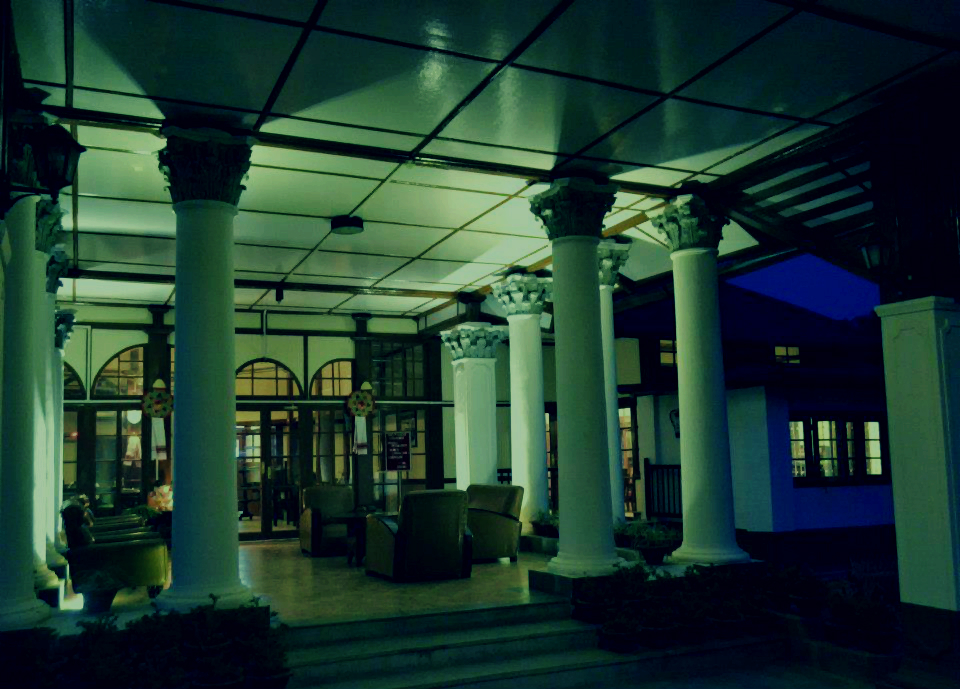
Golaghat Gymkhana EST^{D} 1910

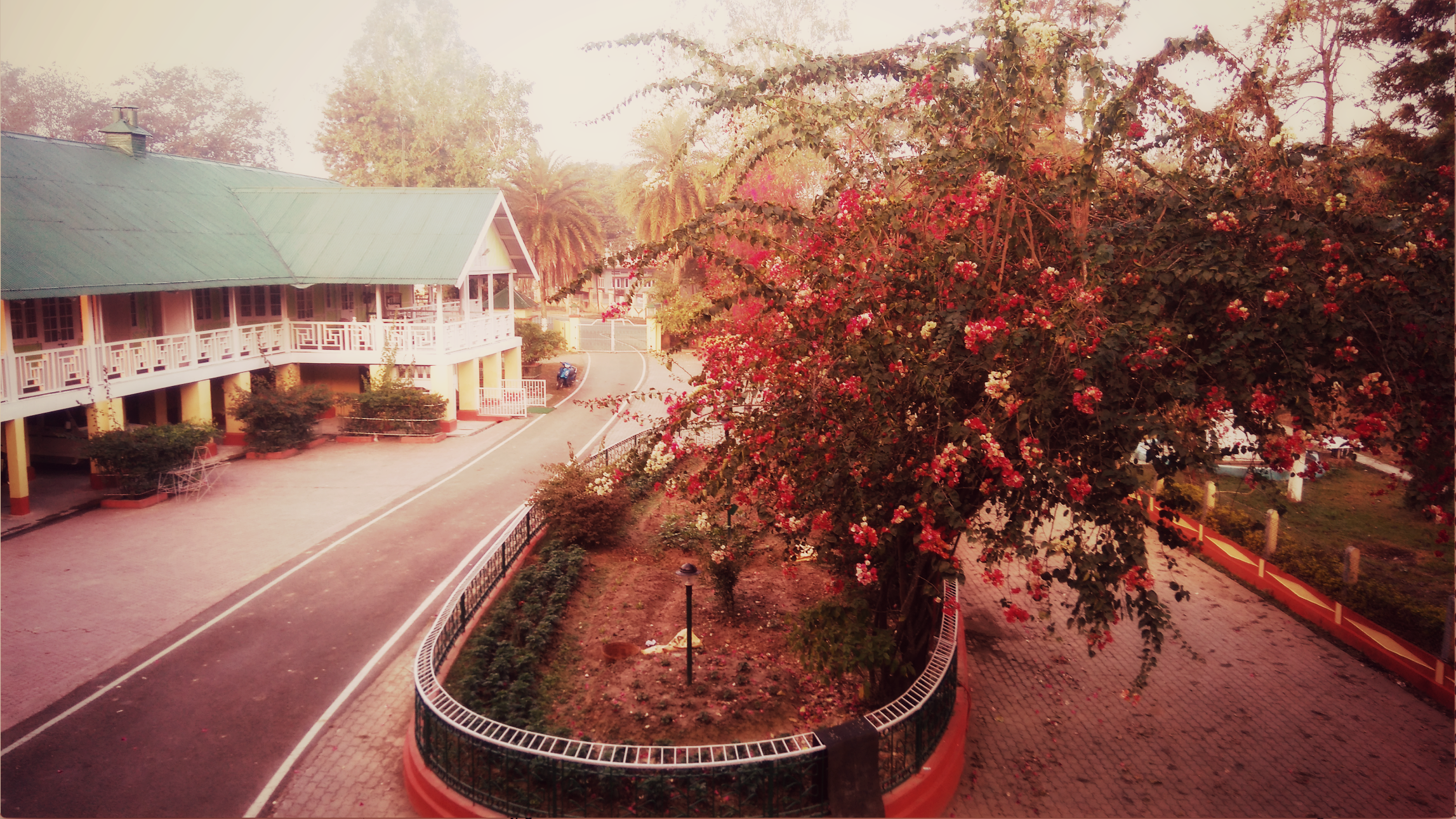
Circuit House, CIRCA 1900

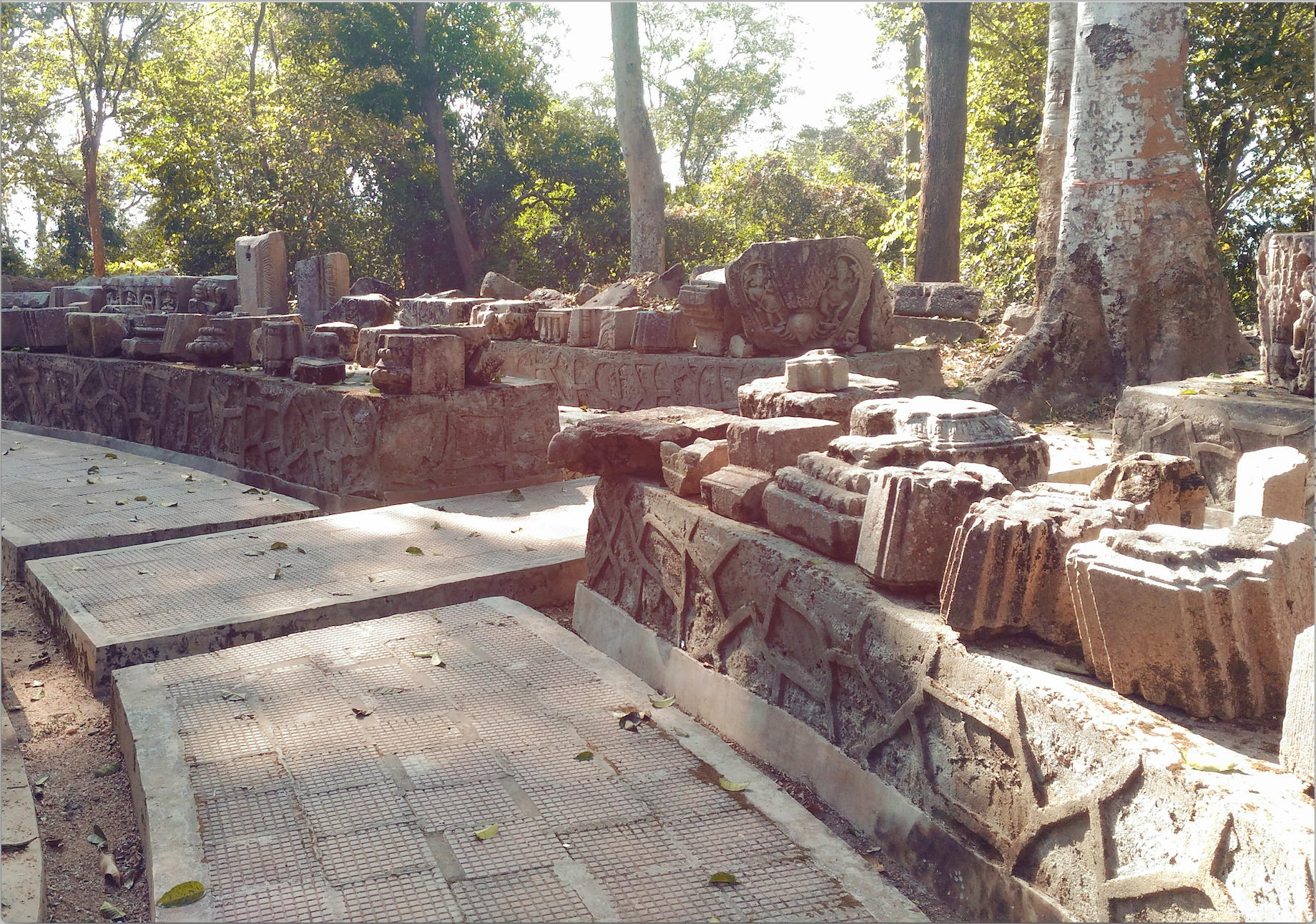
Stone plaques of Deopahar Ruins, AD 900

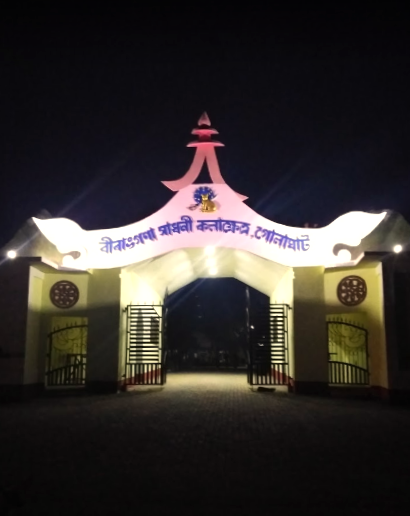
Queen's Arts & Cultural Complex

== See also ==
- Golaghat Baptist Church
- Golaghat Bar Association
- Golaghat British Cemetery
- Golaghat Convention
- D. R. College
- Golaghat Bezbaruah Higher Secondary
- Golaghat Gymkhana
- Golaghat Municipal Board
- NETA (Golaghat)
- Golaghat Natural History Museum
- Golaghat Vidhan Sabha
- JNV Golaghat
- KV Golaghat
- Sacred Heart School
- VKV Golaghat

== Notes ==
=== Bibliography ===
- Ward, S. R. (2010) [First published 1884]. A Glimpse of Assam. Calcutta: City Press: Thomas S. Smith. pp. 24, 25, 67, 74. ISBN 978-1-14-568011-1.
- Sharma, Anil Kumar (2007). Quit India Movement In Assam. New Delhi: Mittal Publications. ISBN 978-8-18-324242-4.
- Swati, Mitra (2011). Assam Travel Guide. Goodearth Publications. p. 106. ISBN 978-9-38-026204-8.
