= Deopahar =

Ancient archaeological site, Assam, India

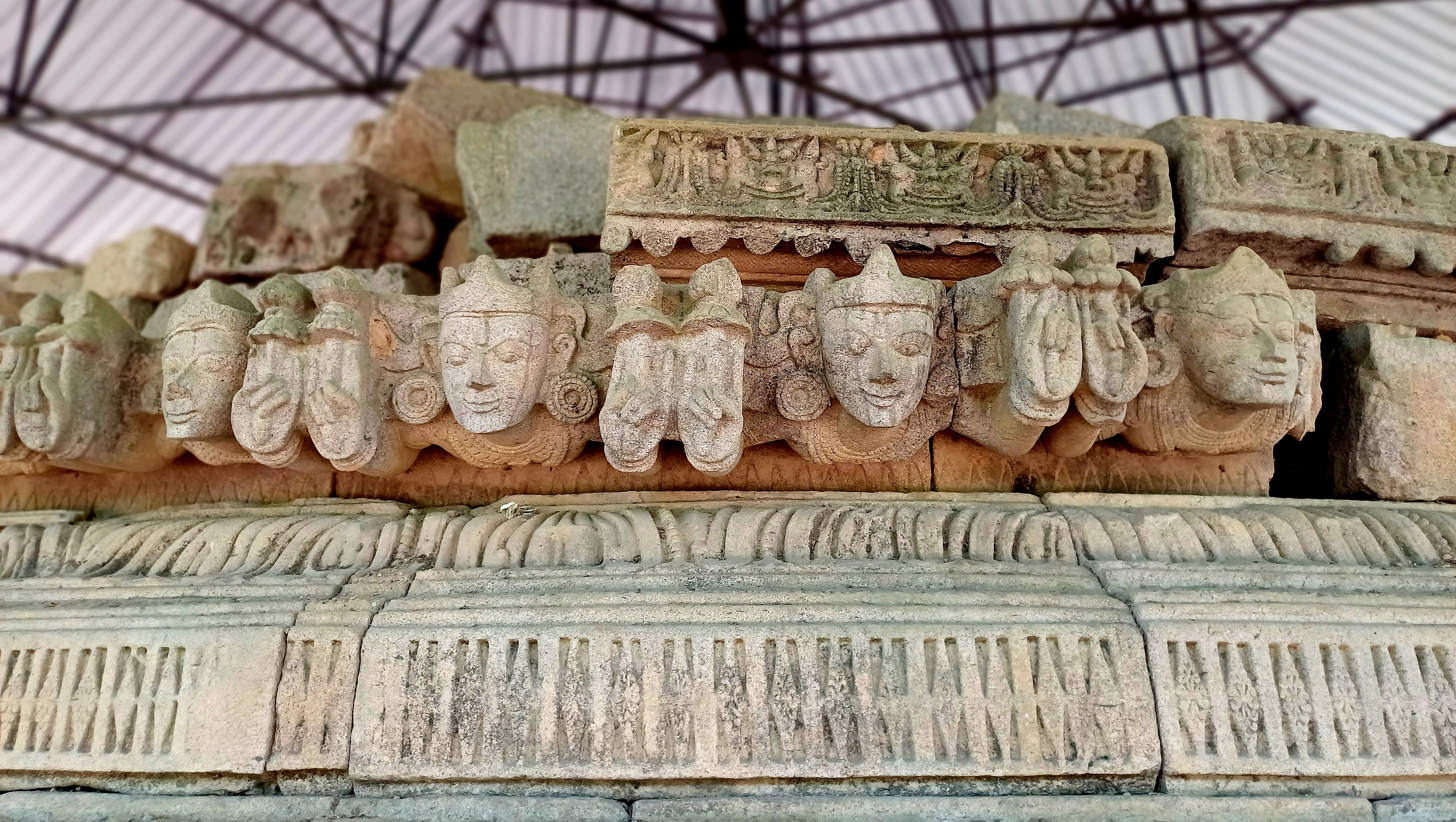
- Deopahar ruins
- Interactive map of Deopahar
- 26°36′08″N 93°43′52″E
- Location: Near Numaligarh, Golaghat district, Assam, India
- Part of: Assam

History
- Built: 10th–11th century
- Built by: Unknown

Site notes
- Material: Granite and Lime mortar
- Condition: Ruins
- Management: Government of Assam

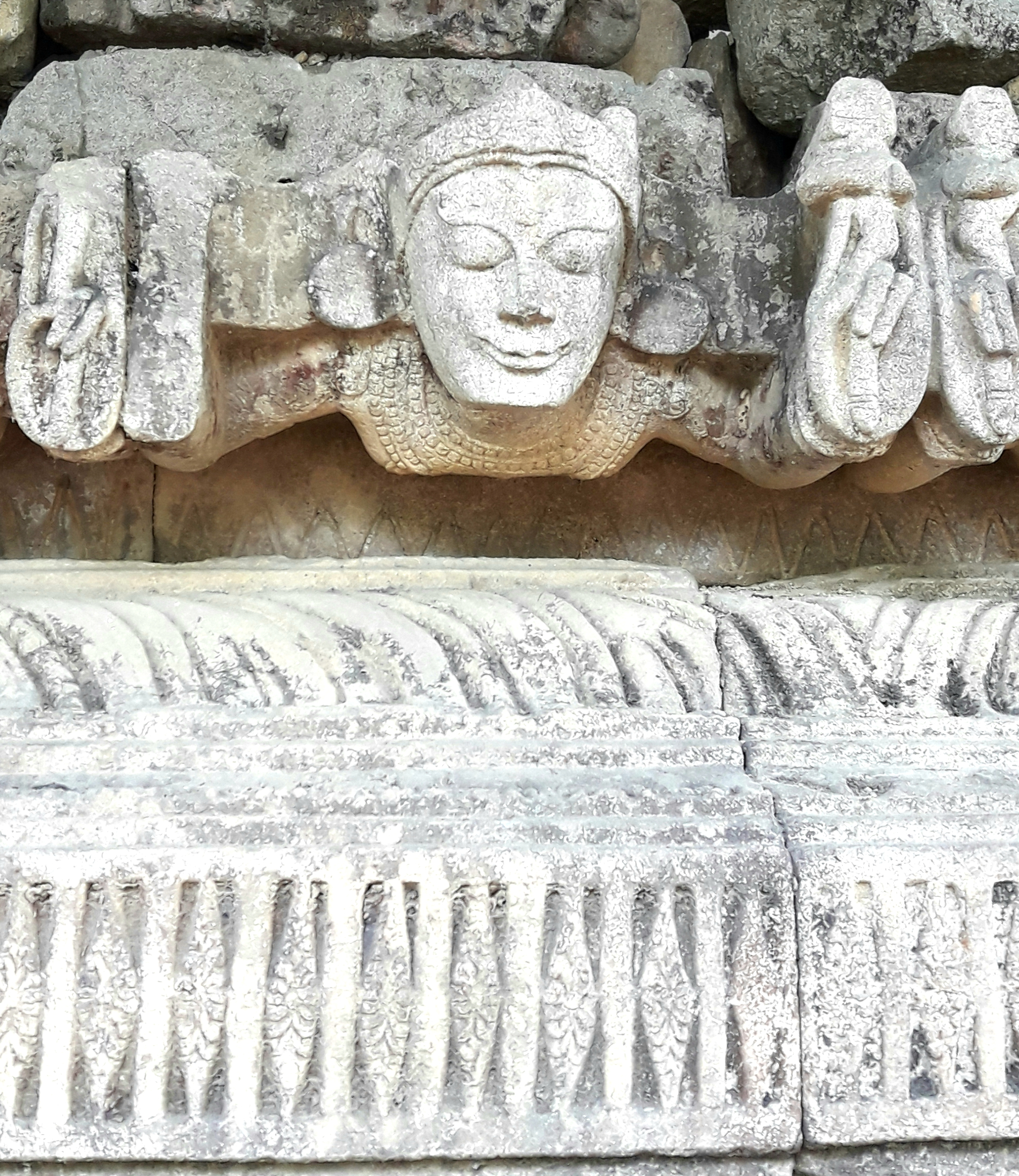
Deopahar Numaligarh Assam sculpture

Deopahar is an archaeological site located in Numaligarh, Assam, India. It is one of the most noteworthy ancient heritages of Golaghat district in Assam. Numaligarh is prominently known as one of the archaeologically rich places of the state because of the historical remains of the ancient temple and sculptures that were excavated from the top of the Deopahar. The ancient stone temple and sculptures uncovered at this site are fine specimens of ancient art that represent the interconnection between Brahmanical art and local art, thus, providing enough data for the historians to determine the period of time it was created. It is a protected archaeological park and has a site-museum under the Directorate of Archaeology. The construction of the stone temple appears to be incomplete or damaged, possibly during the Assam earthquake of 1897.

== Etymology ==
Deopahar is derived from two words: Deo means "Gods", Pahar means "Hills", translating to "The Hills of the Gods".

== Location ==
The Deopahar archaeological site is a tourist destination in Assam. Deopahar, also called Deoparvat, is situated by the side of the Asean Highway 1(NH -129) in Numaligarh, Golaghat district, Assam, India. Deopahar is a part of the Deopani Reserve Forest. The Deopani Reserve Forest covers 133.45 hectares and is rich in flora and fauna. The Deopani Reserve Forest area is an Elephant corridor and is also famous for the False Hemp Tree (Assamese: Bheleu) (Tetrameles nudiflora), which has been accorded heritage tree status. Every year, from October to January, migratory wild giant bees follow routes from the foothills of the Himalayas to this tree to build large beehives. The distance of the Deopahar archaeological site is about 5 km from the Numaligarh Refinery, 61.8 km from Kaziranga National Park, 255 km from Guwahati and approximately 5 km (aerial distance) from the Brahmaputra River.

== History ==
The name Deopahar has many prevailing legends about its origin of the name. The Karbi people who lived by the hill called it Deoparbat or Deopahar. The intricate architectural style of the Deopahar stone temple is indicative of the fact that it belongs to the period somewhere between the 10th and 11th centuries AD. The Deopahar temple has been a temple for Lord Shiva. The Shiva Linga from the Temple was shifted, and the Baba Than, Numaligarh temple, adjacent to Deopahar, was established in the 19th century. As per the Satsari Buranji, there was a burial site (Maidam) of a Sutiya king (Khunta raja) adjacent to Deopahar.

== Architecture ==
An English tea planter named Thomas Guardthei was the first to highlight the significance and complexity of the unique sculpture and architecture of the broken Shiva temple at Deopahar. The stone temple was erected on a monolithic floor. The temple has a big ceiling slab engraved with a large lotus bearing a relief of Vidyadhara holding a scarf and a necklace by both hands. The vast range of sculptured stone blocks was carved out of Precambrian rocks. The stone blocks at the base of the temple were stabilised together with iron hinges, which can be clearly seen.

The overall creative style and design of the building blocks strongly reflect influences of the later Gupta era. There are huge door jambs with foliage of drooping petals, encircling creepers with animal and sculptural representations of female door-keepers with coronets and huge perforated Patrakundalas. Other sculptural representations found are of Kirtimukha, Kalamakaras, Fangananm Shiva, Sridhar Rudra, Lakshmi-Narayana, Hara-Gauri Rashlila, Sarpadevata, Pranayam dhyan, Padma Sakra, Ram and Ravana, Sugriva, etc. and panels with carvings of figures depicting episodes from the Ramayana, the Mahabharata and the Bhagavata Purana.

The sculptures at Deopahar depict flying Apsara, fascinating poses of Vishnu, different gestures of Dwarpal Shiva, Ganesha, Yama, Surya, an image of Sani, dancing images of gods and goddesses on elephants, and male and female dancers. A flying image of 'Apeshwari' or Apsara with three heads is identified as one of the most beautiful sculptures of Deopahar. These pieces of ancient art have are displayed at Numaligarh Shiva Temple and the Assam State Museum at Guwahati. Studying the sculptures, archaeologist G. Bhuyan described them as one of a kind, highlighting the local art of Assam that was developed in the 10th Century.

== Photo gallery ==
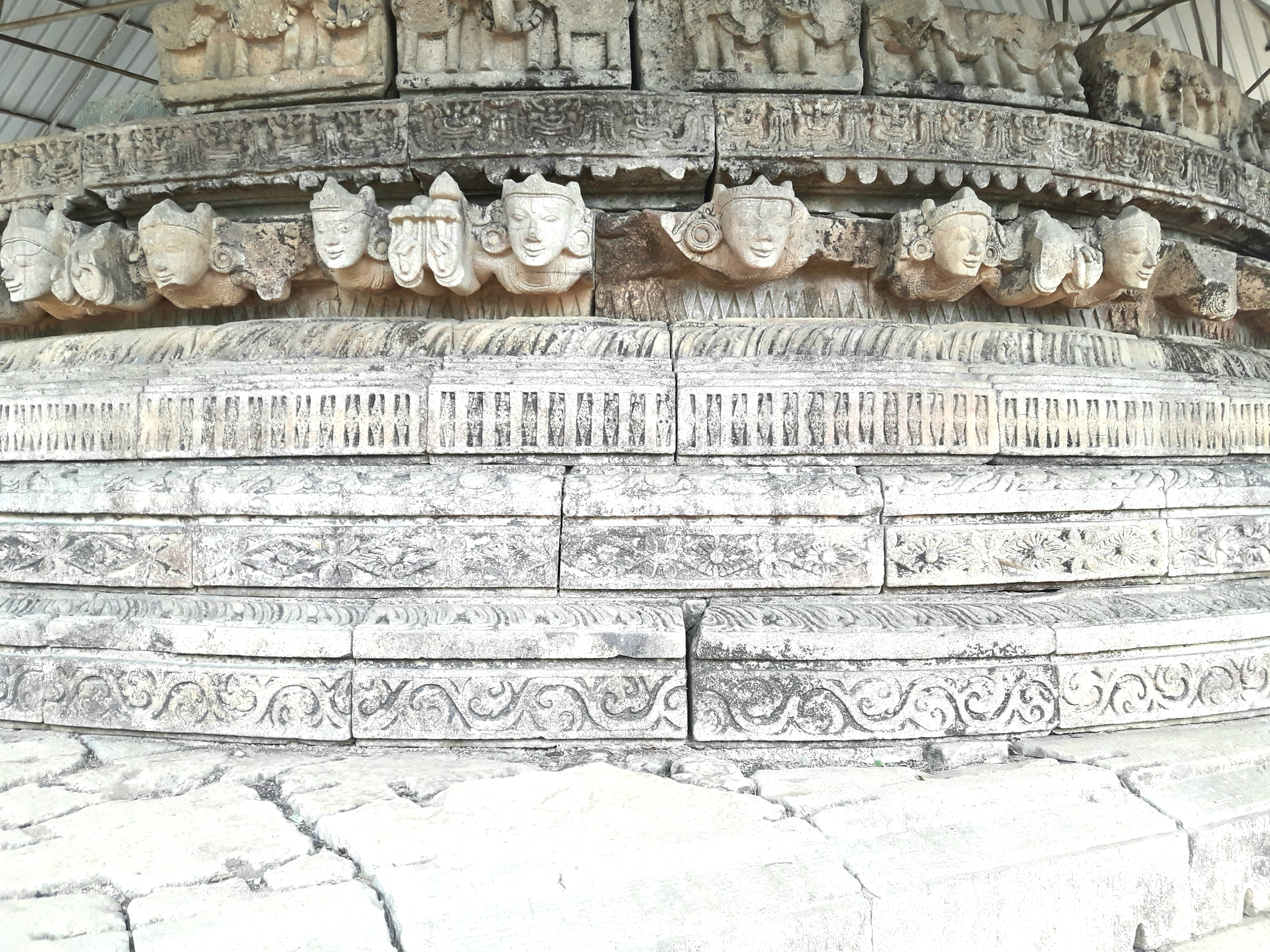
Temple Base - Deopahar

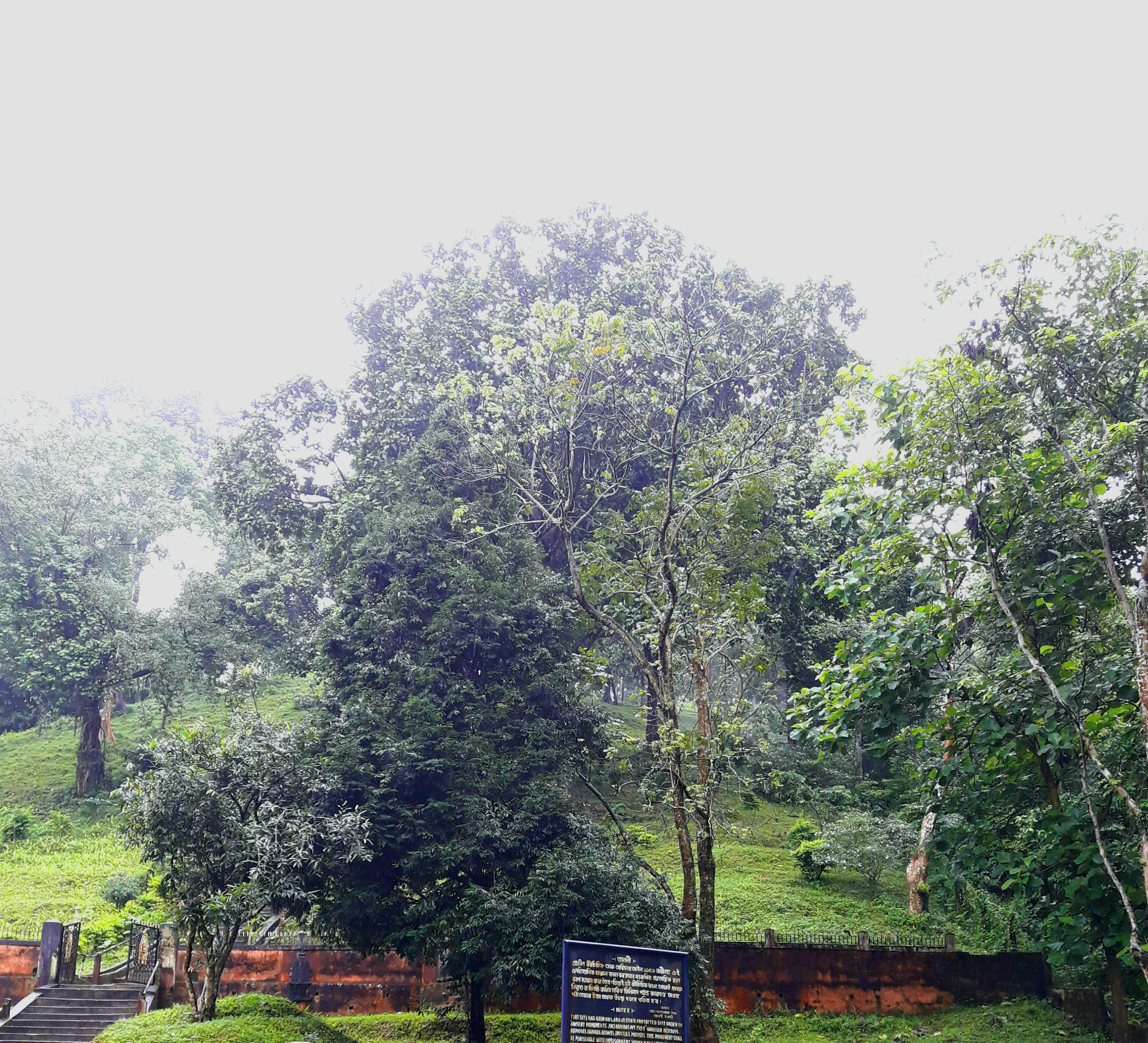
Deopahar Archaeological Site View from Asean Highway 1- (NH 39)

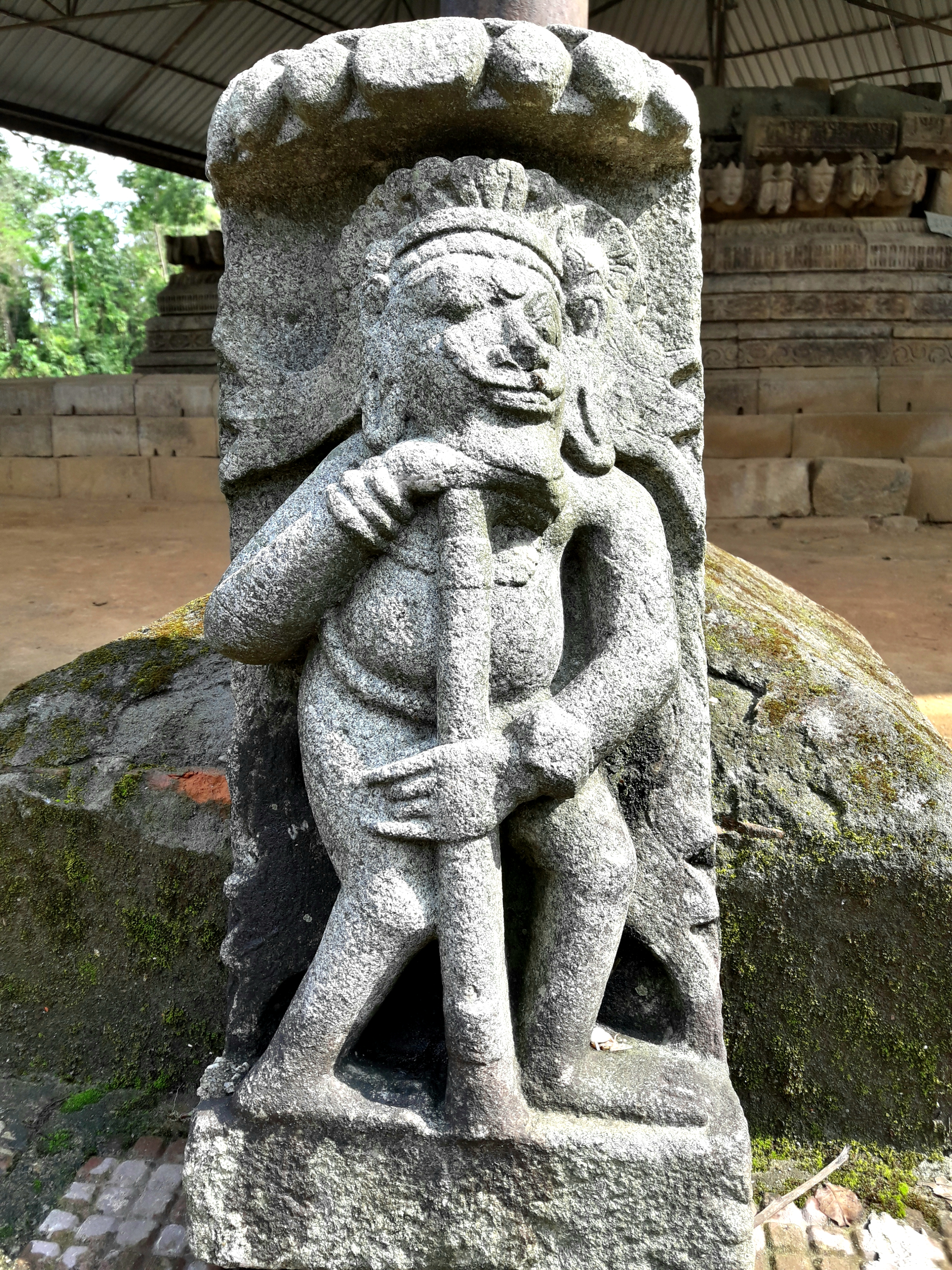
Deopahar - Stone Statue

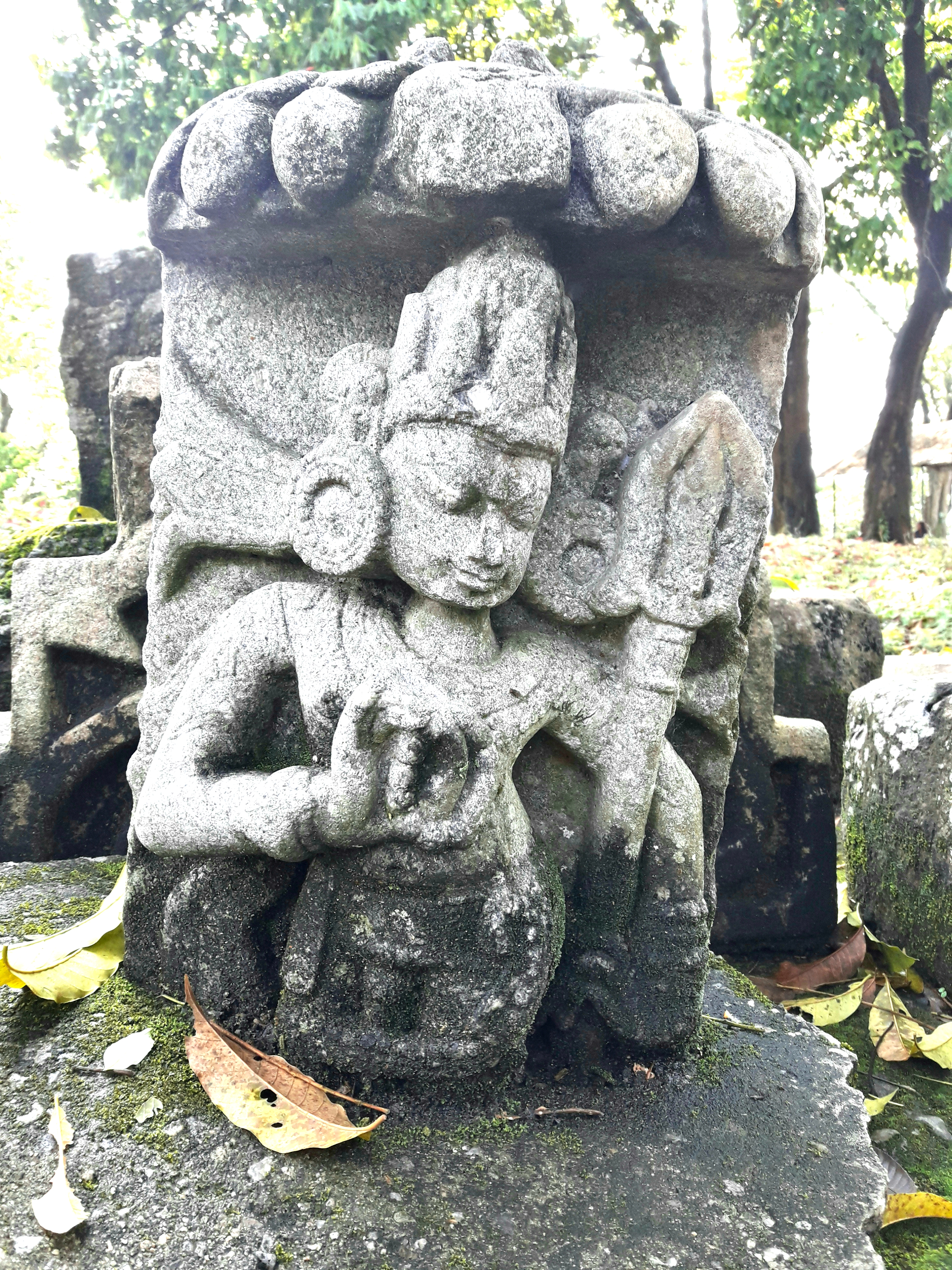
Deopahar - Stone Statue

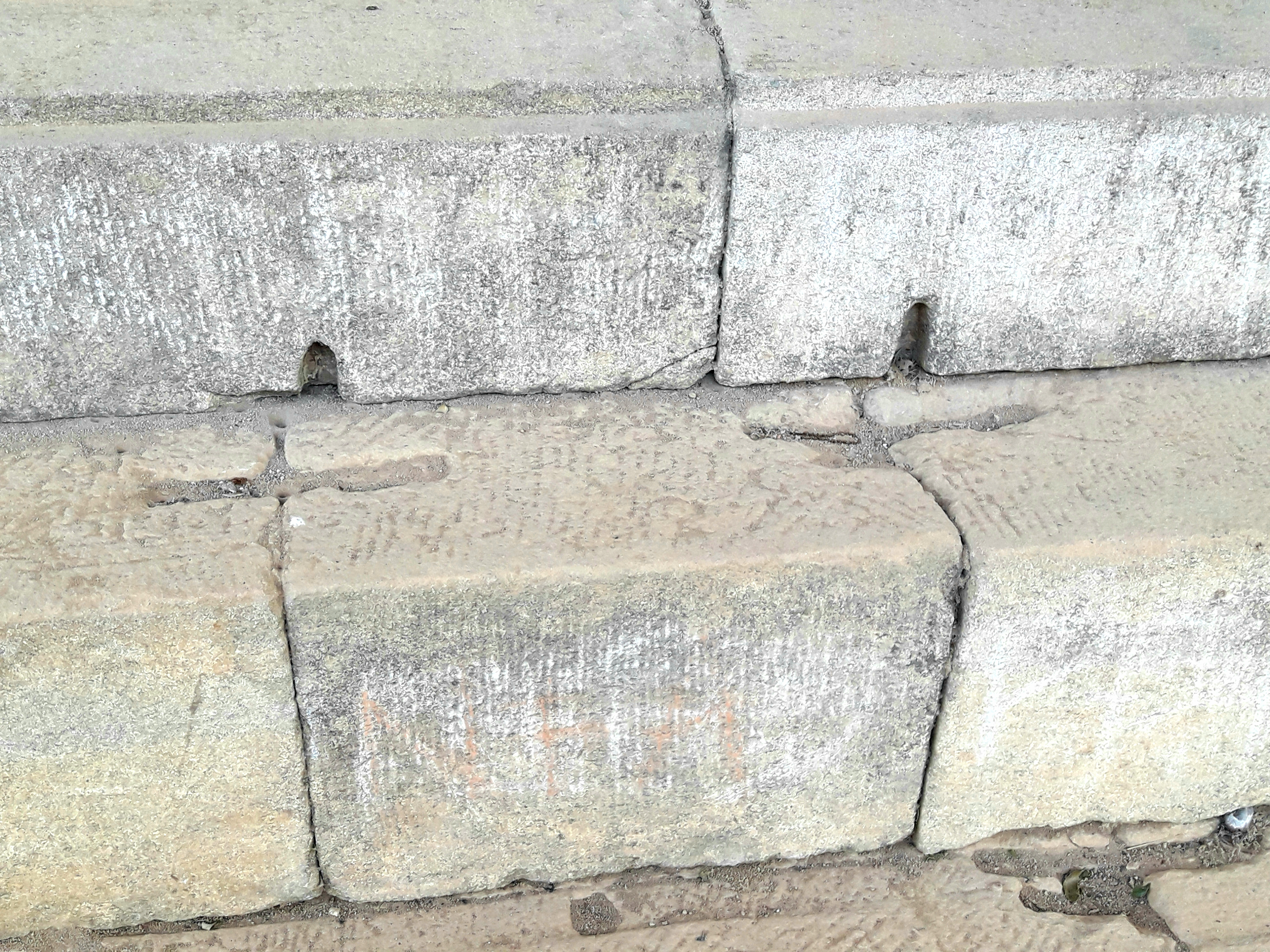
Deopahar - Iron hinges joining Stone blocks

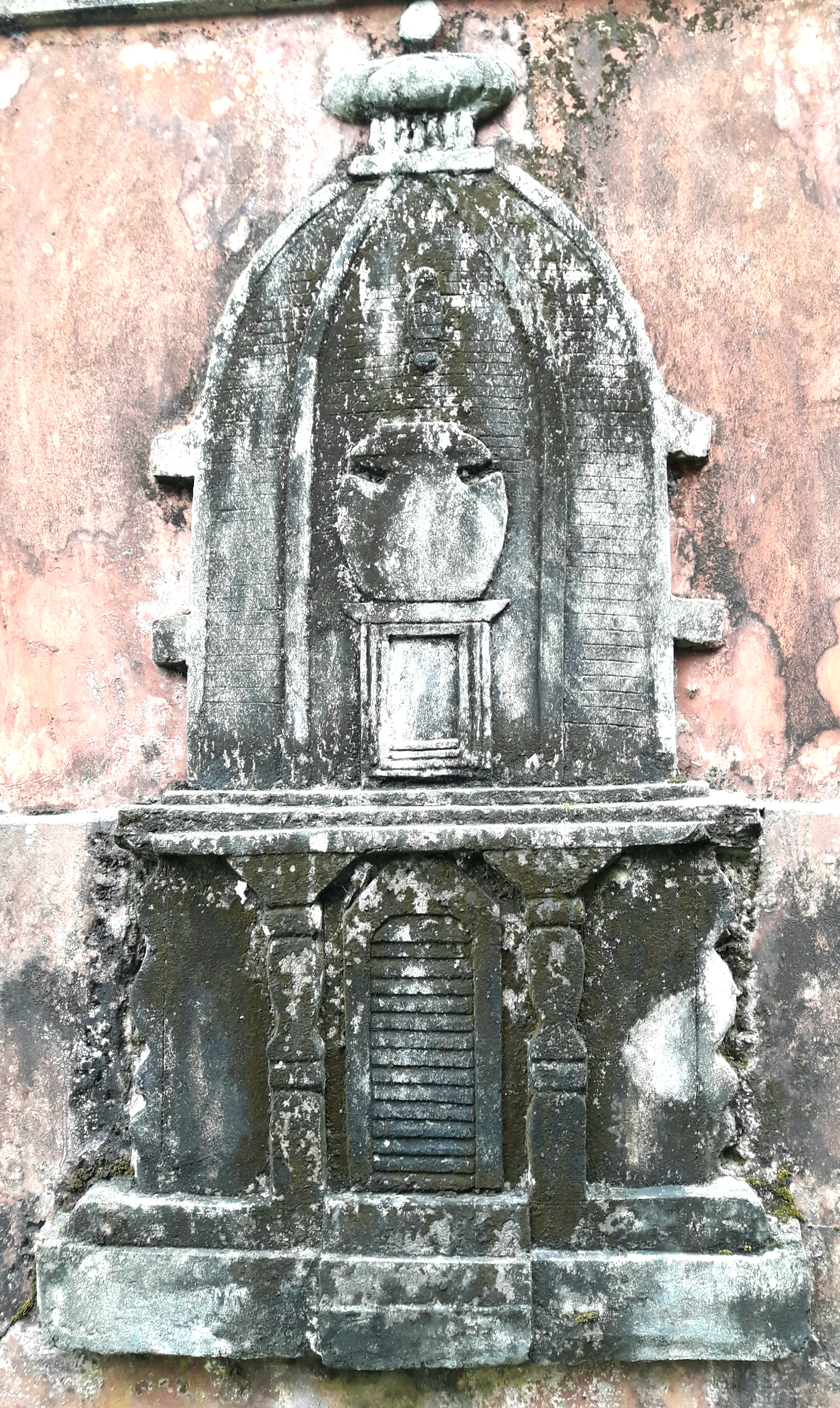
Deopahar Archaeological Site, Numaligarh, Assam, Temple facade sculpture

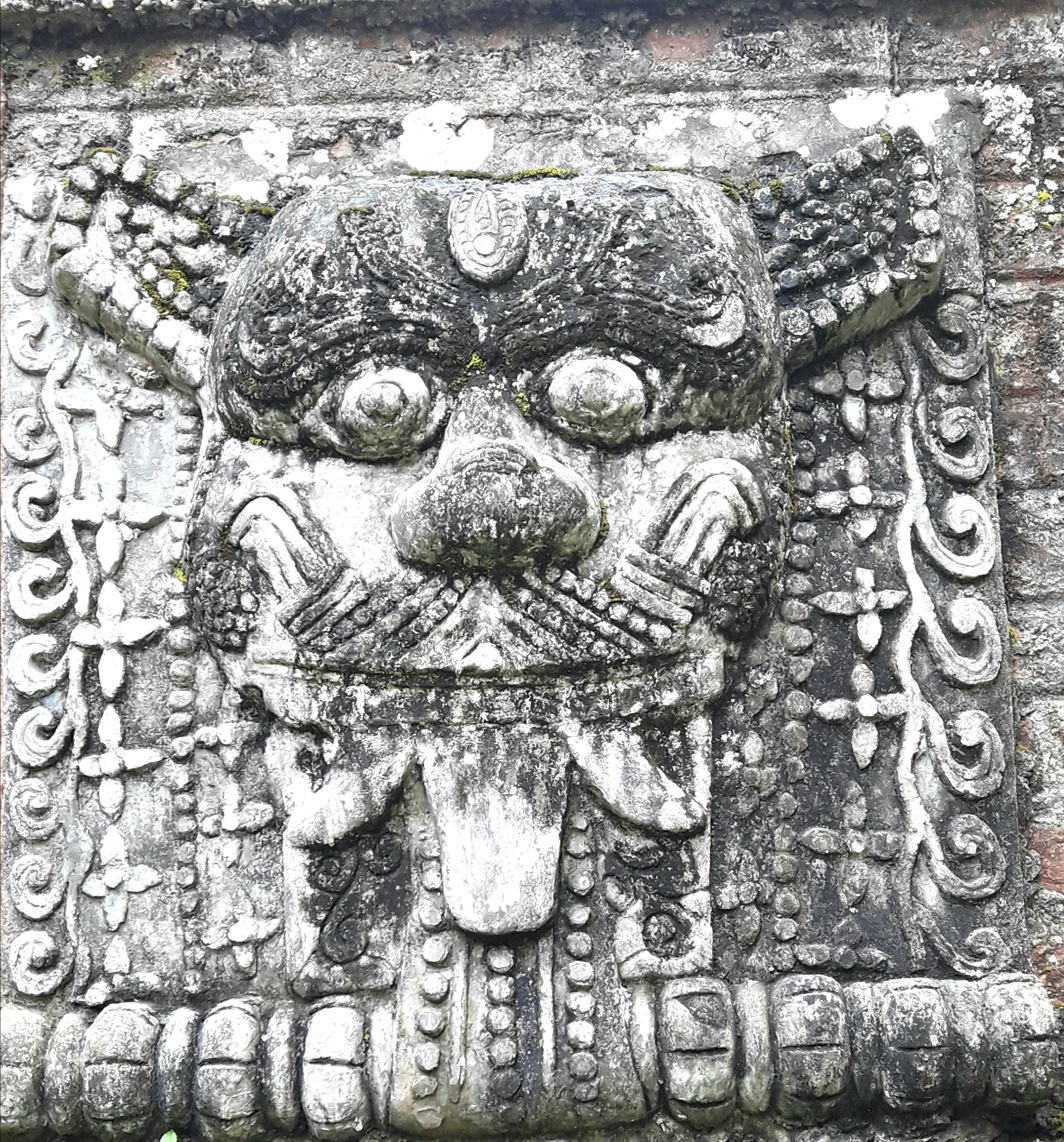
Deopahar Archaeological Site, Numaligarh, Assam, Kirtimukha sculpture
