= Rangajan =

Rangajan is a daily market in Morangi, Golaghat district of Assam state of India.It is also a small township area of Morangi. A bypass has been created in rongajan tiniali that connects via pulibor towards dergaon.
