= AH1 =

Longest route of the Asian Highway Network

Asian Highway 1

Route information
- Length: 20,557 km (12,774 mi)

Major junctions
- East end: Tokyo, Japan 35°41′03″N 139°46′29″E
- West end: Kapıkule, Turkey 41°43′01″N 26°21′10″E

Location
- Countries: Japan, South Korea, North Korea, China (including Hong Kong), Vietnam, Cambodia, Thailand, Myanmar, India, Bangladesh, Pakistan, Afghanistan, Iran, Turkey

Highway system
- Asian Highway Network
→ AH2

Asian Highway 1 (AH1) is the longest east–west route of the Asian Highway Network, running 20,557 km (12,774 mi) from Tokyo, Japan via the Korean Peninsula (South Korea and North Korea), China (Mainland China and Hong Kong), Mainland Southeast Asia (Vietnam, Cambodia, Thailand, and Myanmar), South Asia (India, Bangladesh, and Pakistan), and the Iranian Plateau (Afghanistan and Iran) to the international border between Turkey and Bulgaria west of Istanbul where it joins the 6,102-km European route E80, running all the way to Lisbon, Portugal.

== Associated routes ==
From east to west, the primary corridors include:

=== Japan ===
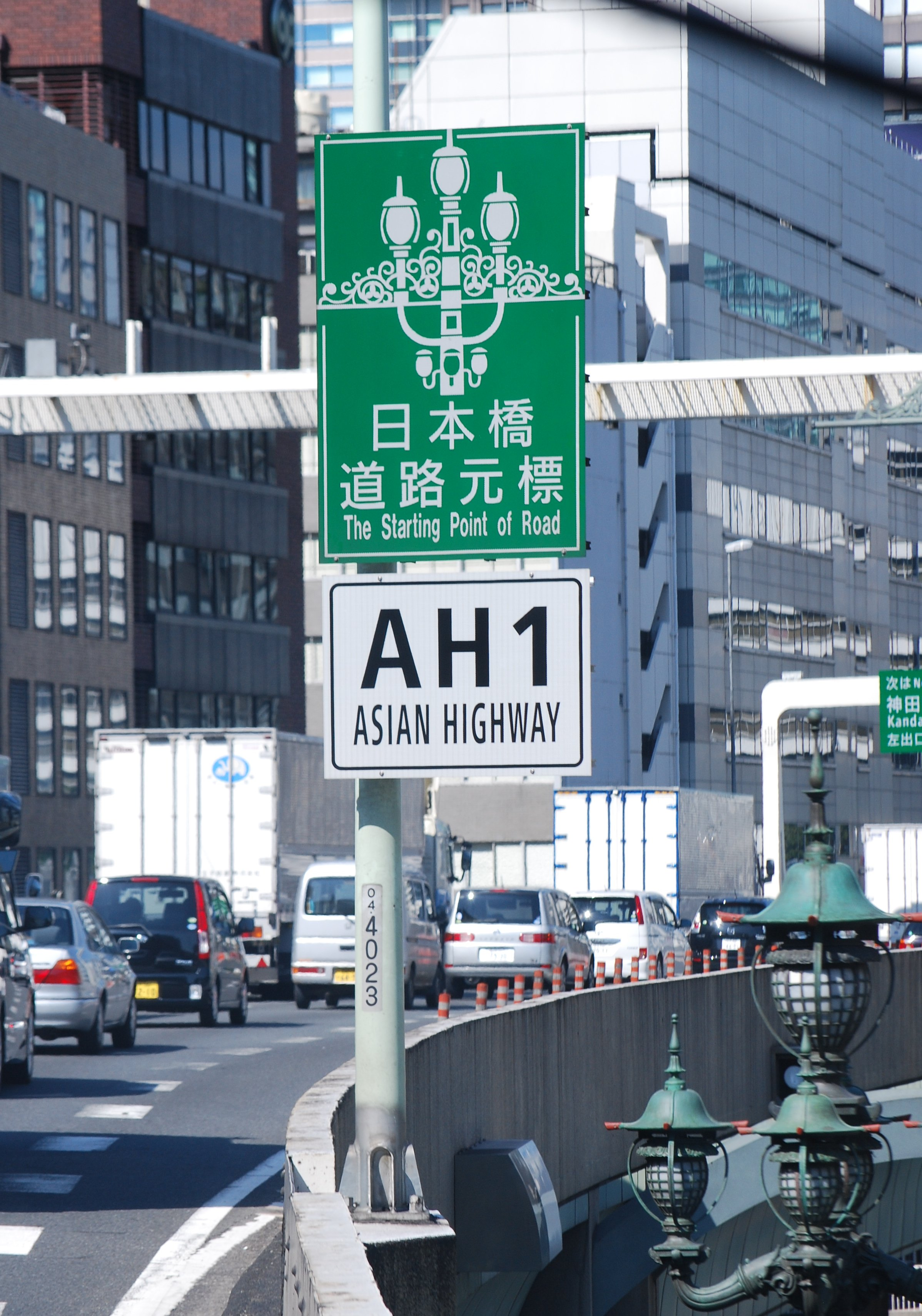
AH1 at Nihonbashi, Tokyo, the "zero milepost" for measuring highway distances to Tokyo.

The 1,200-kilometre (750 mi) section in Japan was added to the system in November 2003. It runs along the following tolled expressways:

- Shuto Expressway C1 Inner Circular Route, Edobashi JCT to Tanimachi JCT via Takebashi JCT
- Shuto Expressway Route 3 Shibuya Line, Tanimachi JCT to Yoga Exit (Tokyo Interchange)
- Tōmei Expressway, Tokyo Interchange to Komaki
- Meishin Expressway, Komaki to Suita via Kyoto
- Chūgoku Expressway, Suita to Kobe
- San'yō Expressway, Kobe to Yamaguchi via Hiroshima
- Chūgoku Expressway, Yamaguchi to Shimonoseki
- Kanmon Bridge, Shimonoseki to Kitakyushu
- Kyushu Expressway, Kitakyushu to Fukuoka
- Fukuoka Expressway Route 4
- Fukuoka Expressway Route 1
- Camellia Line ferry to Busan, South Korea.

From Fukuoka, the Japan–Korea Undersea Tunnel has been proposed to provide a fixed crossing.

=== South Korea ===
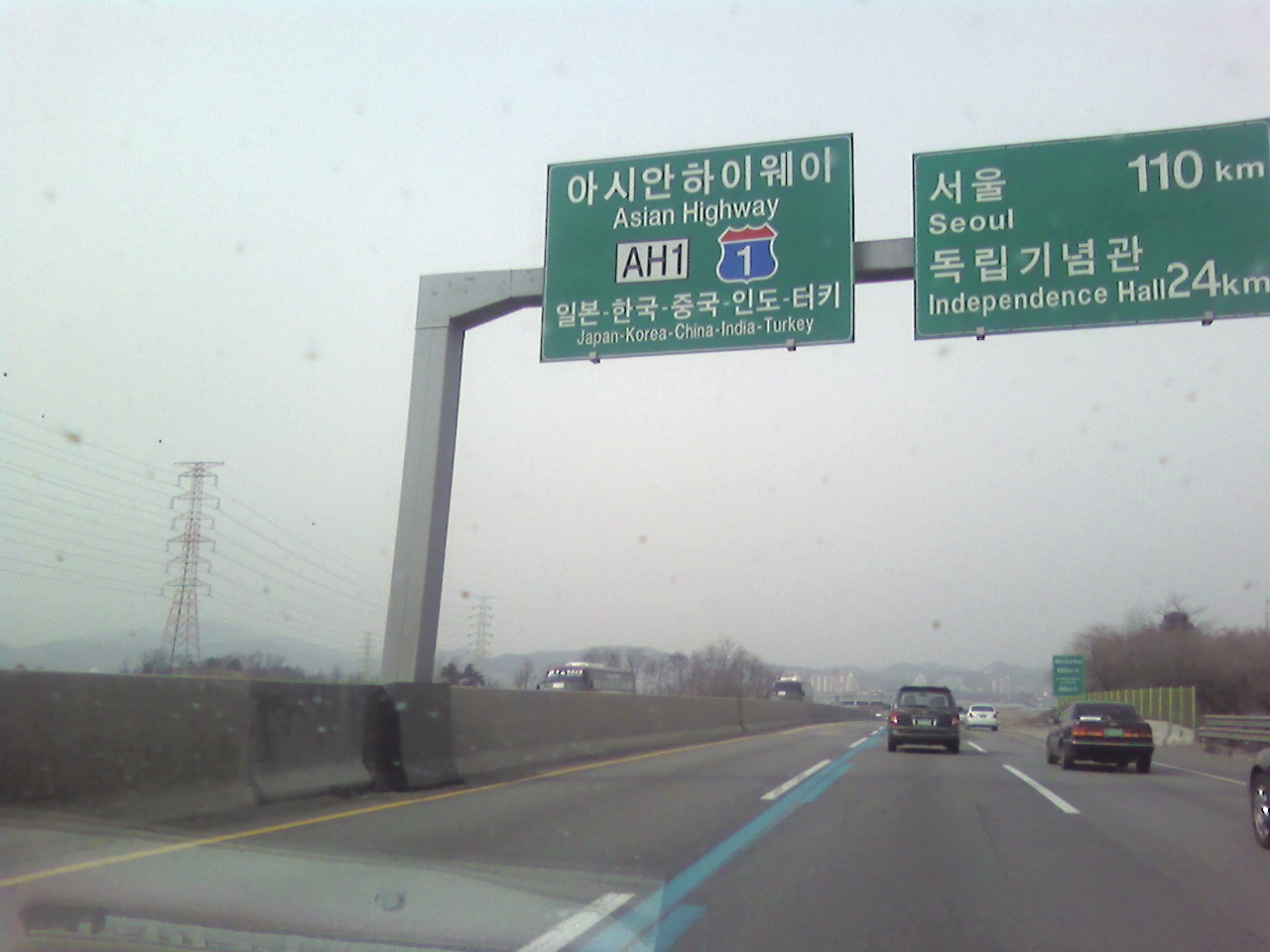
Signage along the Gyeongbu Expressway with AH 1 route marker

The section in South Korea mainly follows the Gyeongbu Expressway. The Highway Boundary of South and North Korea.

- Busan City Route 71: Busan-Centre - Busan-Dong-gu
- Busan City Route 11: Busan-Dong-gu - Busan-Geumjeong-gu
- Gyeongbu Expressway: Busan-Geumjeong-gu - Gyeongju - Daegu - Daejeon - Seoul-Seocho-gu
- Seoul City Route 41: Seoul-Seocho-gu - Seoul-Gangnam-gu - Seoul-Yongsan-gu
- Namsan 1st tunnel: Seoul-Yongsan-gu - Seoul-Jung-gu
- Seoul City Route 21: Seoul-Jung-gu - Seoul-Eunpyeong-gu
- National Route 1: Seoul-Eunpyeong-gu - Panmunjom

=== North Korea ===
- 1 P'anmunjŏm - Kaesŏng
- Pyongyang-Kaesong Motorway: Kaesŏng - P'yŏngyang
- 1 Pyongyang–Sinuiju Motorway: P'yŏngyang - Sinŭiju

=== China ===
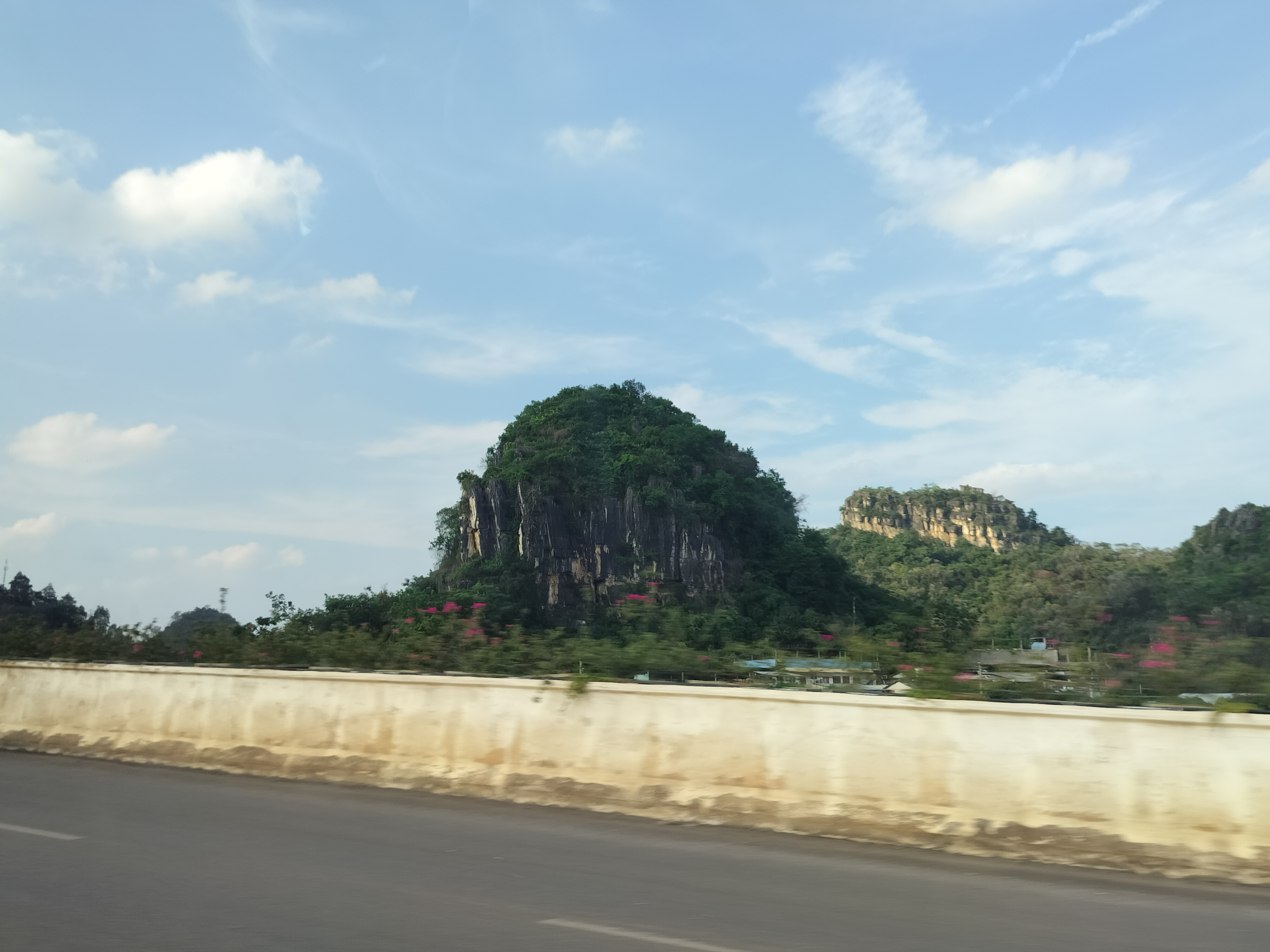
Nanning - Youyi Pass Highway in Fusui County

- Within Dandong: New Yalu River Bridge - Guomen Avenue - S326 (Dandong Xinqu IC) - G11 Zhangjiabao JCT - G1113 Dandong JCT
- G1113: Dandong - Shenyang
- Within Shenyang: G1501: Xiashengou JCT - Jinbaotai JCT - Beiliguan JCT
- G1: Shenyang - Jinzhou - Beijing
- Within Beijing: G4501: Shiyuan JCT - Maju JCT - Shuangyuan JCT - Fangshan Liyuan JCT
- G4: Beijing - Shijiazhuang - Zhengzhou - Xinyang - Wuhan - Changsha - Xiangtan - Guangzhou
- Within Guangzhou: G1508: Taihe JCT - Longshan JCT - Leping JCT - Hengjiang JCT
- G80: Guangzhou - Nanning
- G7211: Nanning - Youyiguan

==== Guangzhou - Shenzhen branch ====
- G1508: Taihe JCT - Guantian JCT
- Guangdong S3: Guangzhou - Shenzhen (Shenzhen Bay Port)

=== Hong Kong ===
- Route 10: Shenzhen Bay Port - Shenzhen Bay Bridge - Lam Tei
- Route 9: Lam Tei - Yuen Long Highway - San Tin Highway - Lok Ma Chau Control Point

=== Vietnam ===
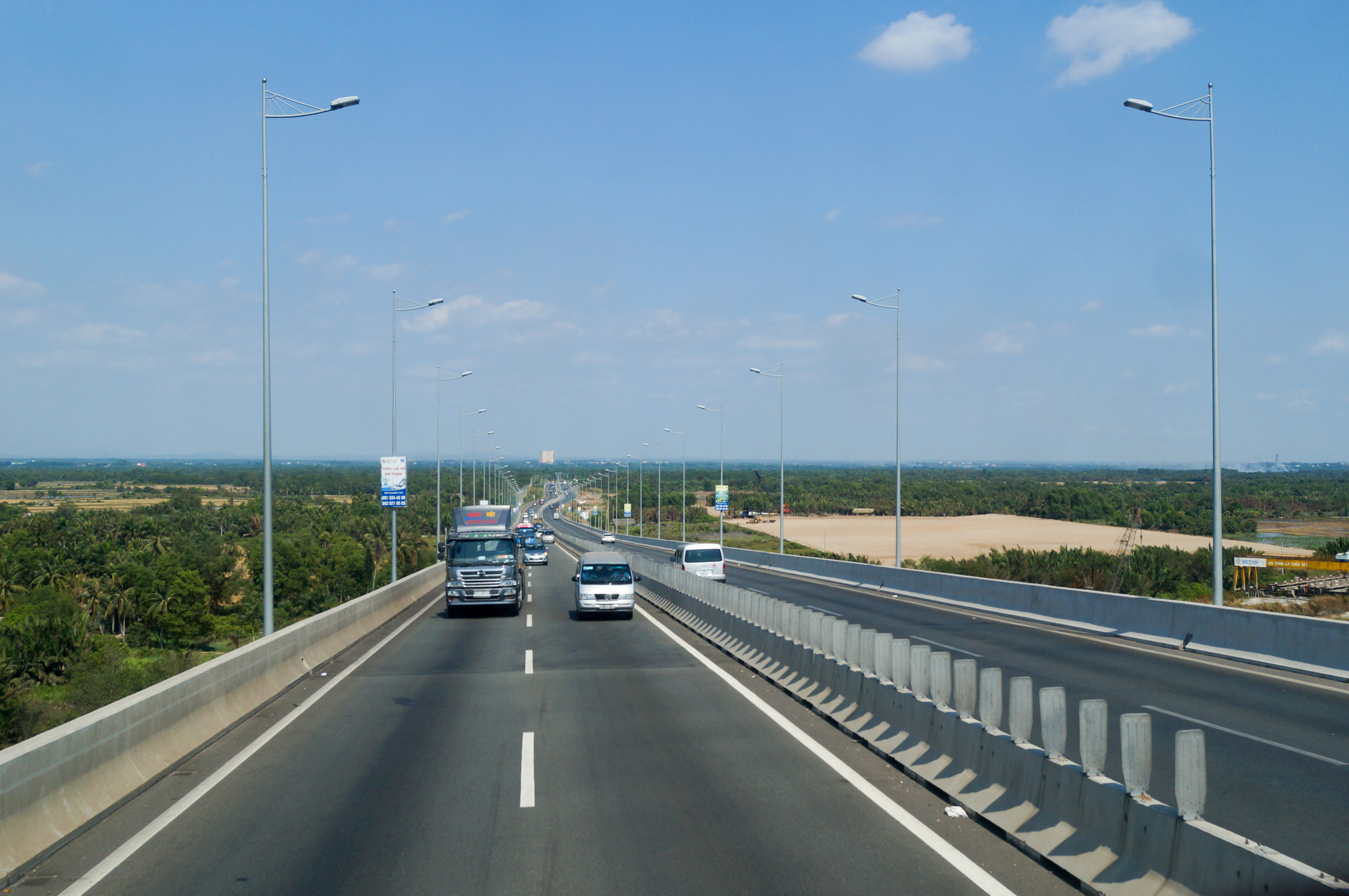
Long Thanh Bridge

- : Hữu Nghị Quan - Đồng Đăng
- : Lạng Sơn - Bắc Ninh - Hanoi
- : Hanoi
- : Hanoi - Ninh Bình - Thanh Hóa - Nghệ An - Hà Tĩnh - Quảng Trị - Huế - Đà Nẵng - Quảng Ngãi - Gia Lai - Đắk Lắk - Khánh Hòa - Lâm Đồng - Đồng Nai
- : Đồng Nai - Phú Hữu
  - Connection to HCMC Ring Road 2 (Phú Hữu to High-Tech Park) (temporary)
  - Connection to (High-Tech Park to Station 2) (temporary)
- : Ho Chi Minh
- : Ho Chi Minh - Mộc Bài

In future,

- (Hữu Nghị Quan - Chi Lăng)
- (Long Trường - Tân Thạnh Đông and Vĩnh Thanh - Bến Lức - Tân Thạnh Đông)
- (HCMC - Mộc Bài)

will become part of AH1 instead of the current National Highway 1 and National Highway 22.

=== Cambodia ===
- Route 1: Bavet - Phnom Penh
- Route 5: Phnom Penh - Poipet

=== Thailand ===
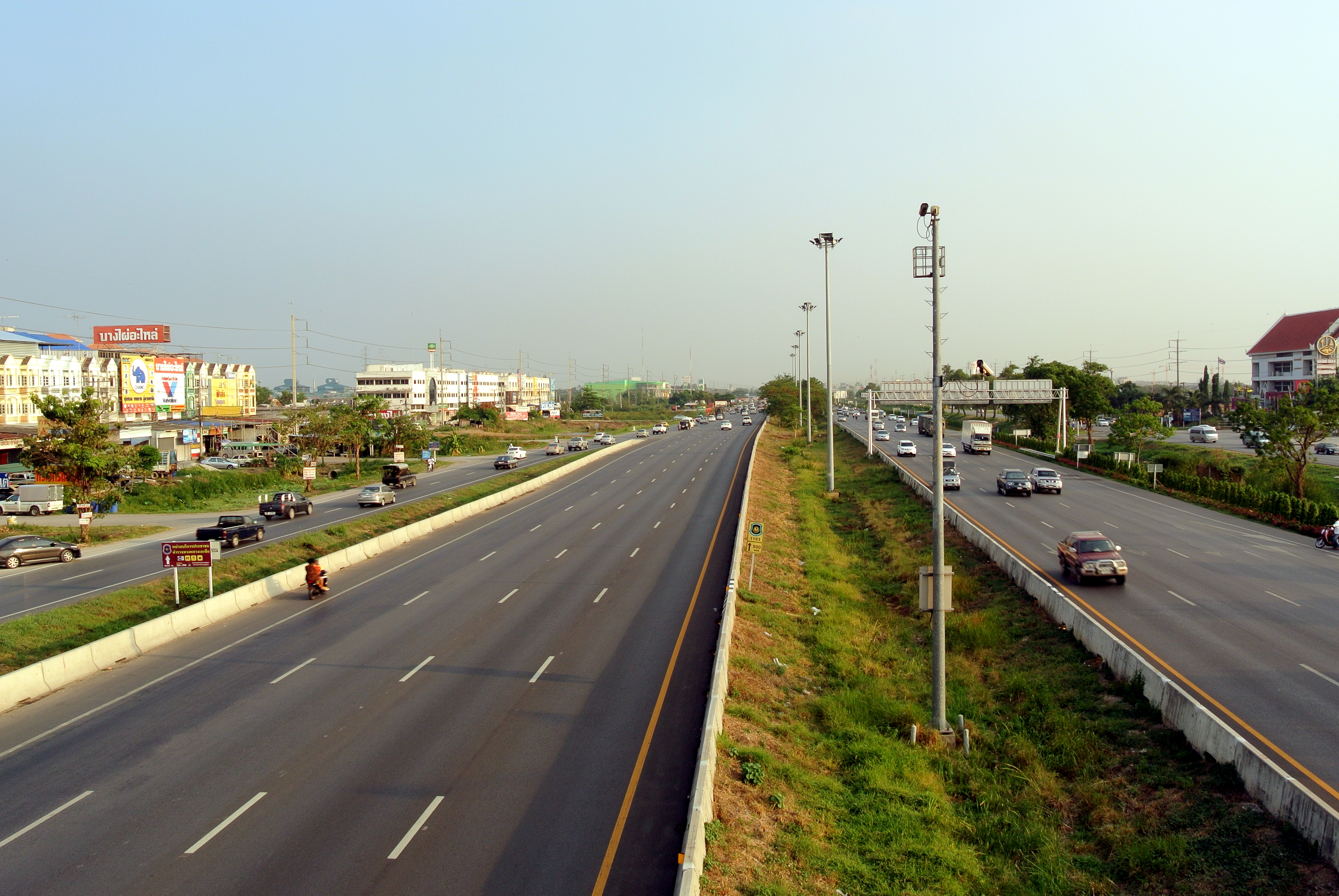
AH1, AH2 and Thailand Route 32 in Ayutthaya

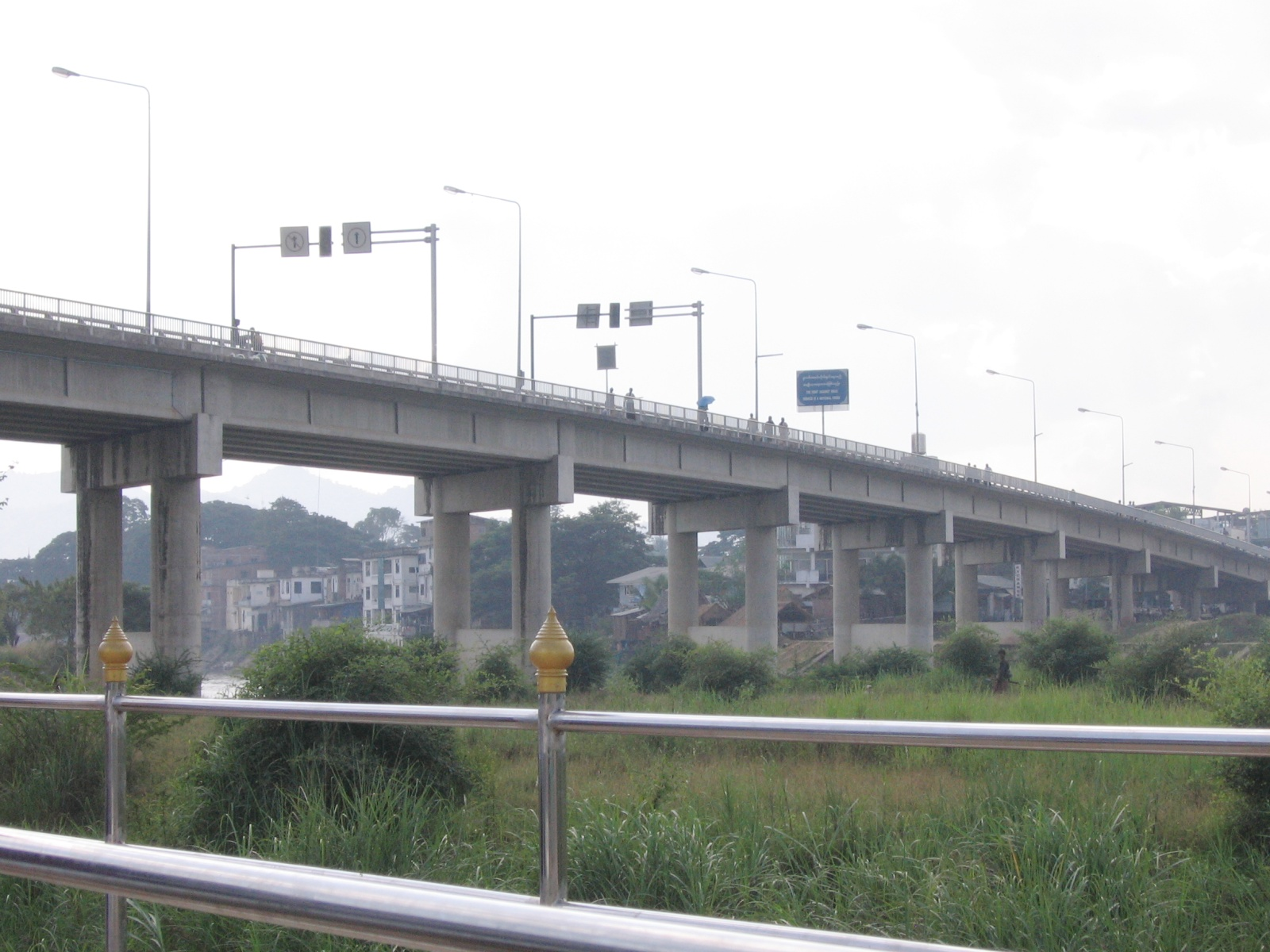
Thai Myanmar Friendship Bridge

- Route 33: Aranyaprathet - Kabin Buri - Hin Kong
- Route 1: Hin Kong - Bang Pa In
- Route 32: - Bang Pa In - Chai Nat (Concurrent with AH2)
- Route 1: Chai Nat - Tak (Concurrent with AH2)
- Route 12: Tak - Mae Sot

=== Myanmar ===
- National Highway 8: Myawaddy - Payagyi
  - Branch Yangon–Mandalay Expressway : Payagyi - Yangon
- Yangon–Mandalay Expressway: Payagyi - Meiktila - Mandalay
- National Highway 7: (Concurrent with AH2): Mandalay - Tamu

=== India (East) ===
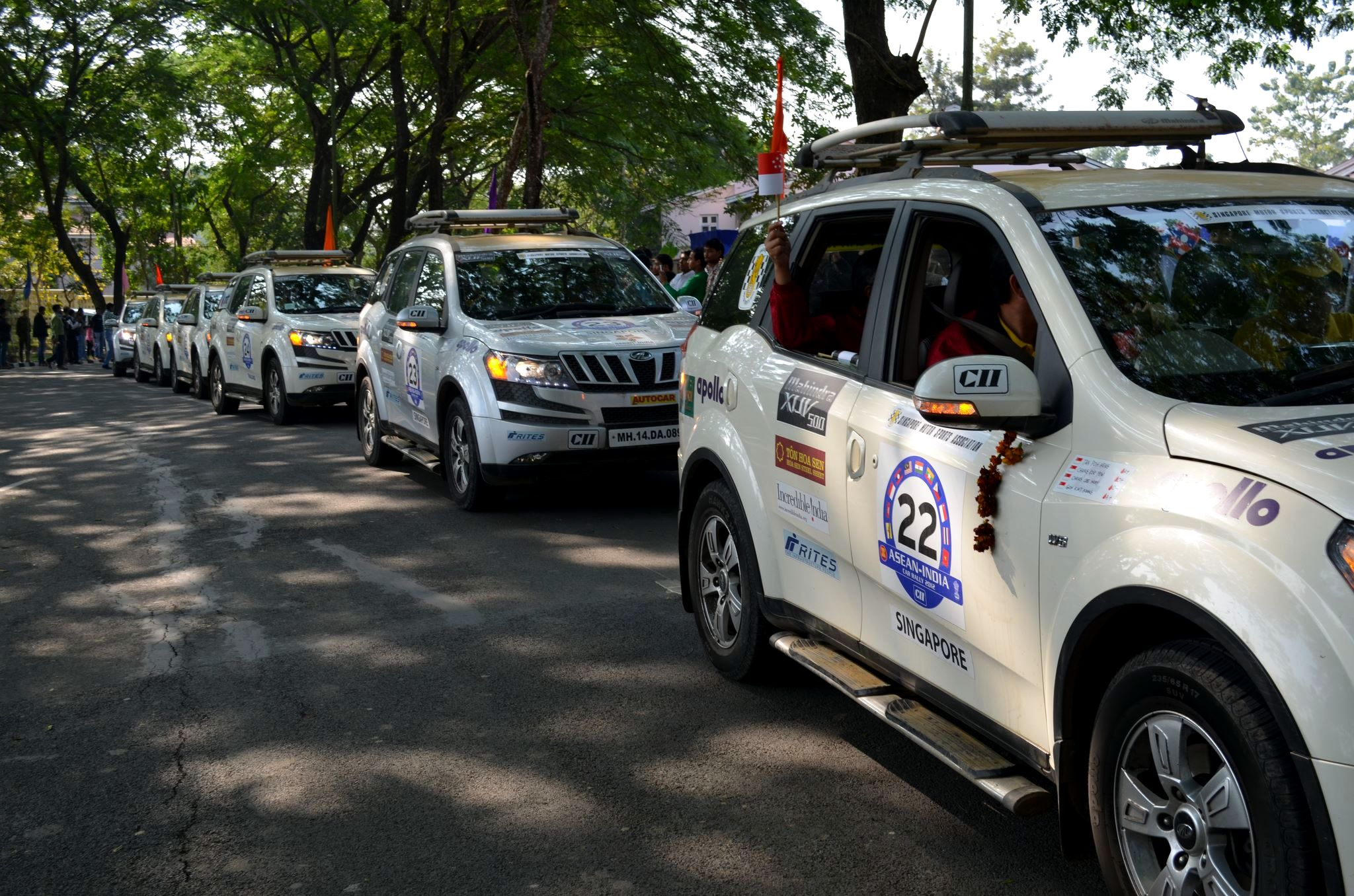
Asean India car rally crossing AH1 at Numaligarh

- NH 102: Moreh - Imphal
- NH 2: Imphal - Viswema - Kohima
- NH 29: Kohima - Chümoukedima - Dimapur - Doboka
- NH 129: Dimapur- Silonijan - Rangajan - Numaligarh
- NH 27: Doboka - Nagaon - Jorabat
- NH 6: Jorabat - Shillong
- NH 206: Shillong - Dawki

=== Bangladesh ===
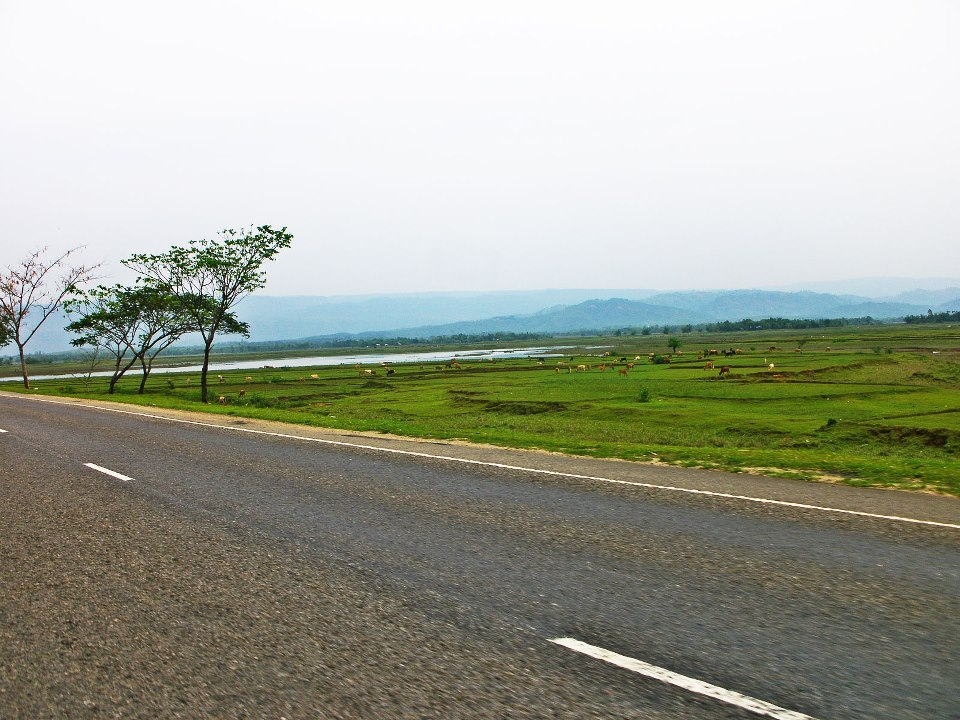
N2 in Bangladesh

- N2: Tamabil, Sylhet - Sylhet - Kanchpur - Dhaka
- N8: Dhaka-Mawa-Bhanga Expressway
- N804: Bhanga, Faridpur - Alipur, Faridpur
- N803: Alipur, Faridpur - Goalchamot, Faridpur
- N7: Faridpur - Jashore
- N706: Jashore - Benapole

=== India (West) ===
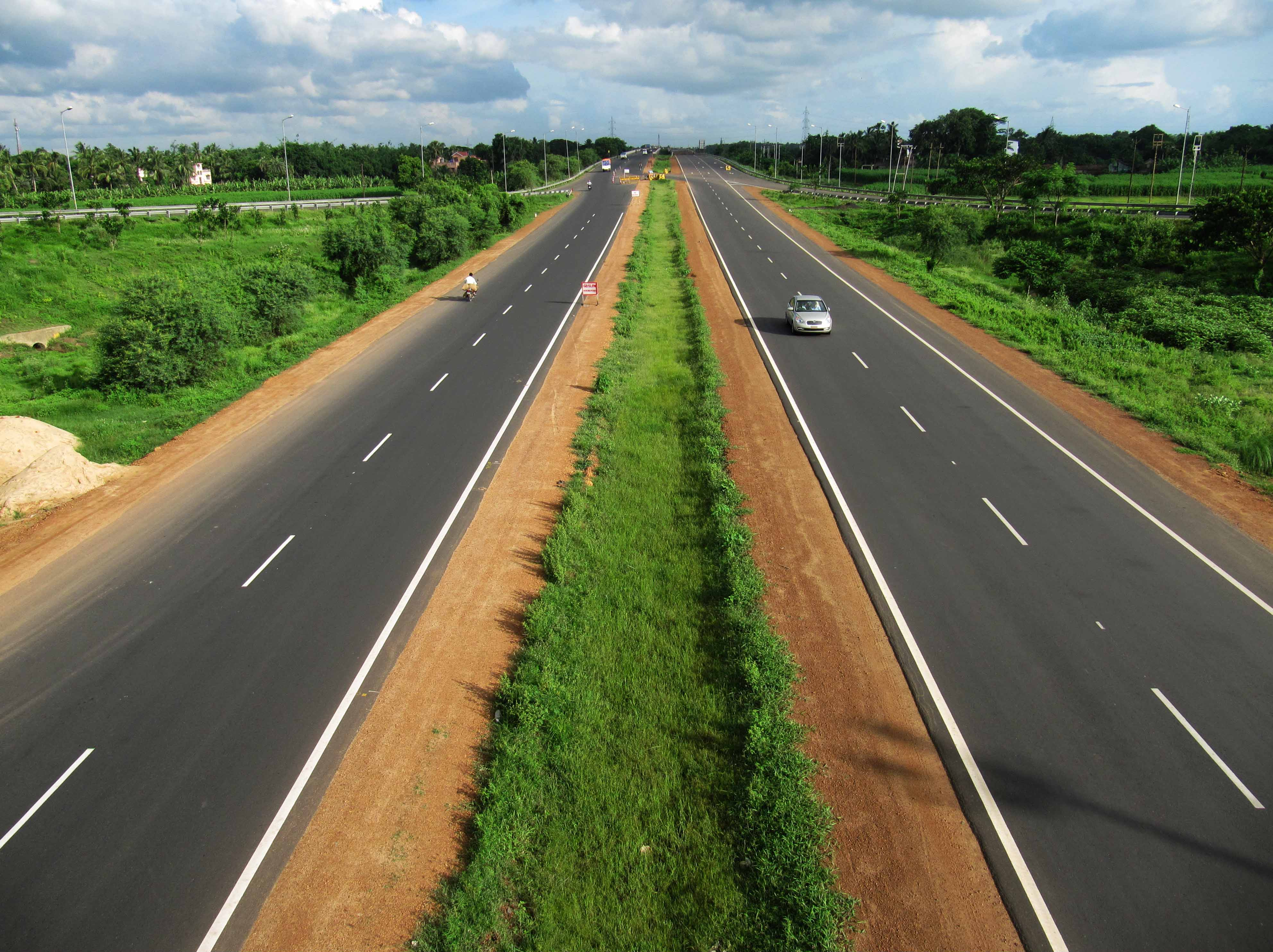
Durgapur Expressway as part of the Grand Trunk Road in West Bengal

- NH 112: Petrapole - Barasat
- NH 12: Barasat - Kolkata Airport
- NH 19: Dankuni - Bardhaman - Durgapur -Asansol - Dhanbad -Barhi - Mohania - Varanasi - Allahabad - Kanpur - Agra - New Delhi
- NH 44/ Grand Trunk Road: New Delhi - Sonipat - Ambala - Jalandhar
- NH 3/ Grand Trunk Road: Jalandhar - Amritsar - Attari

=== Pakistan ===
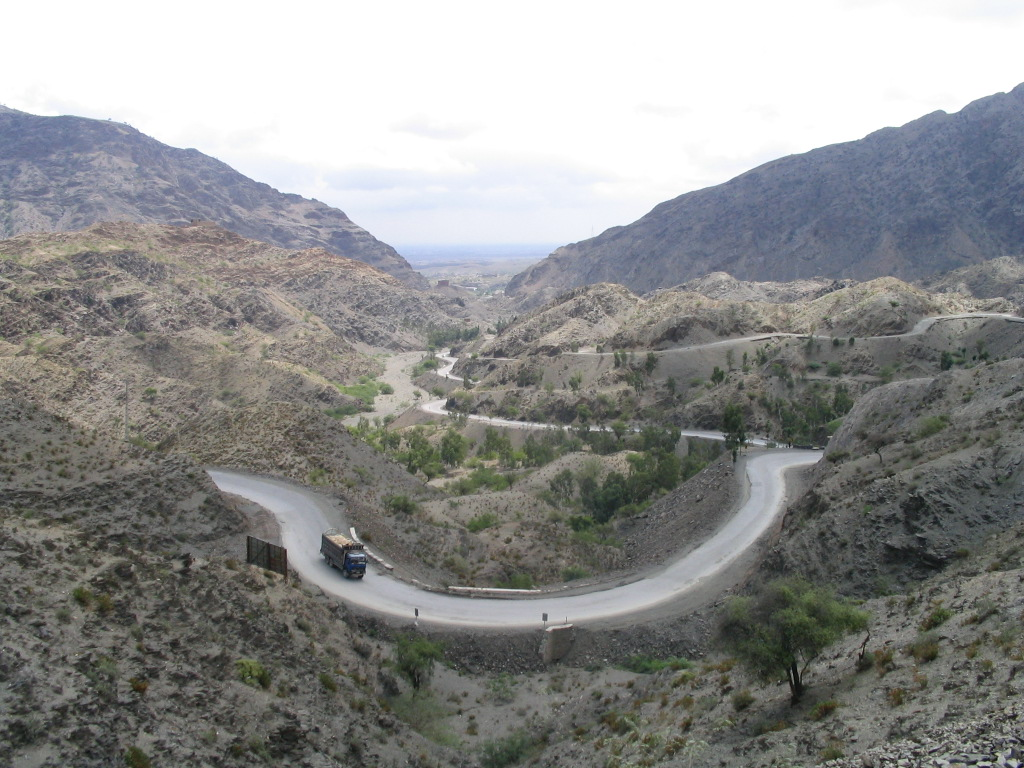
Khyber Pass

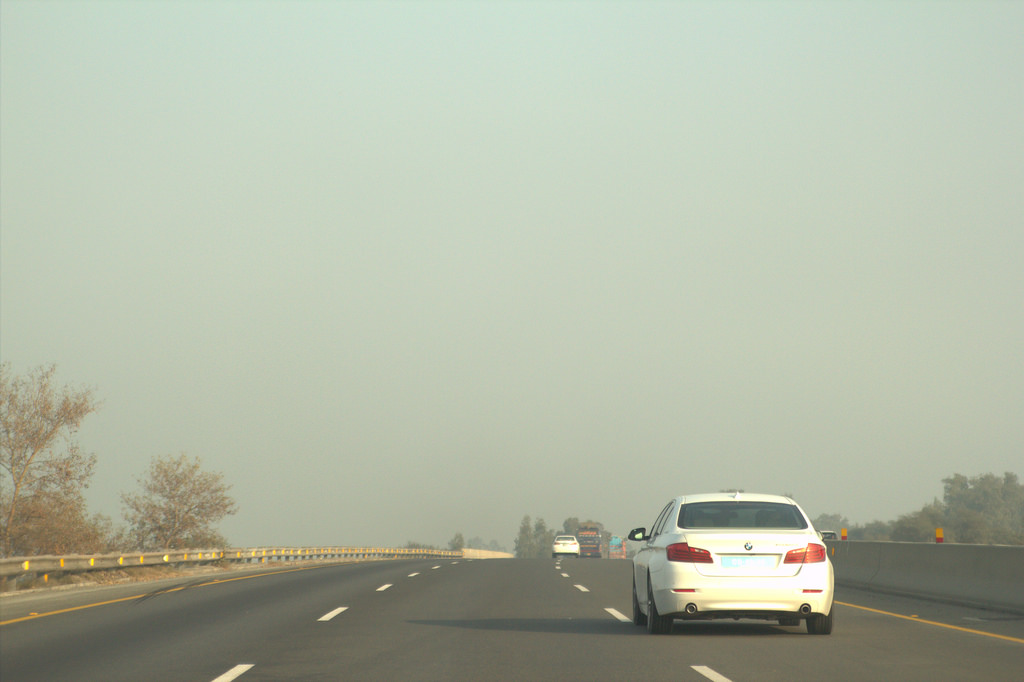
Motorway M-2, Lahore-Islamabad

- Grand Trunk Road, Wagah — Lahore
- M-2: Lahore — Islamabad
- M-1: Islamabad — Peshawar
- N-5: Peshawar — Torkham

=== Afghanistan ===
- NH08 : Jalalabad - Kabul
- NH0101 Ring Highway: Kabul - Kandahar
- NH0102 Ring Highway: Kandahar - Delaram - Herat
- NH63 : Herat - Islam Qala

=== Iran ===
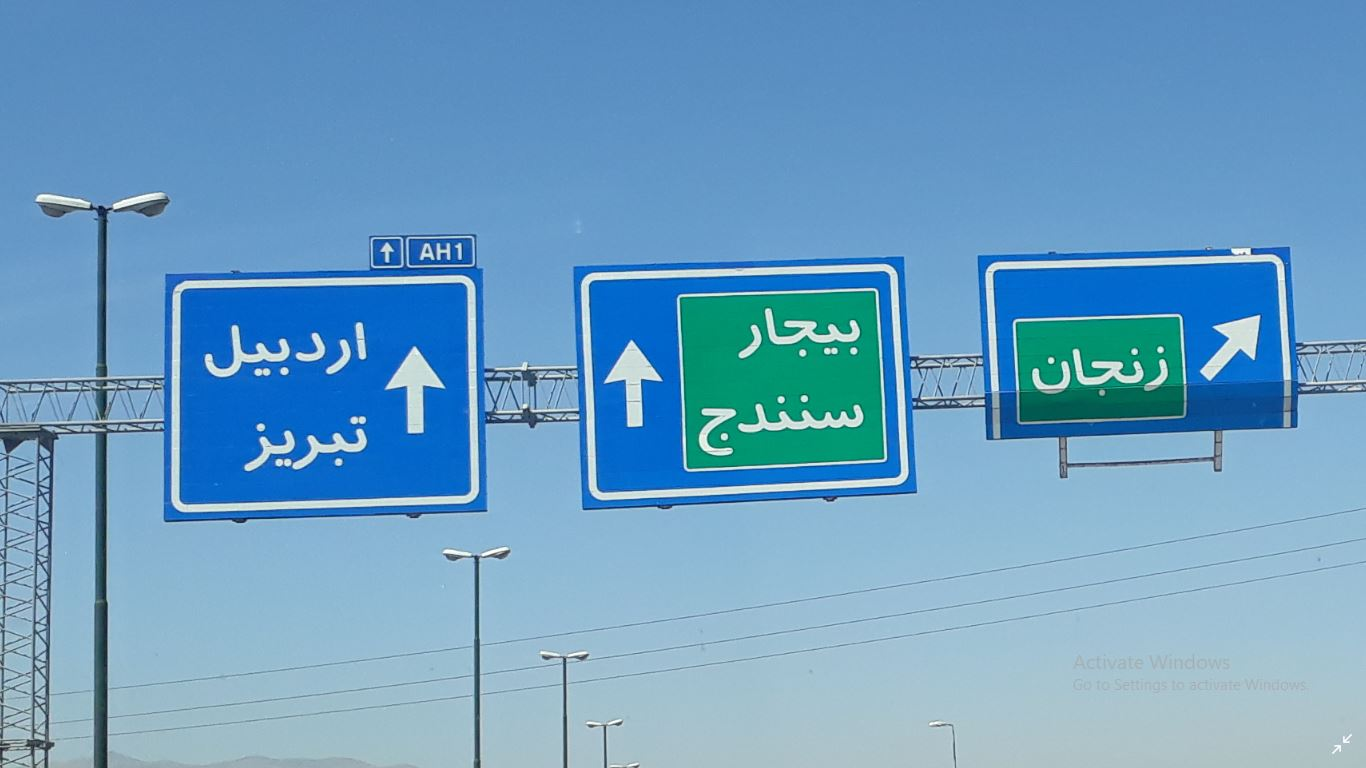
Qazvin Zanjan Freeway is a part of Asian Highway 1 in Iran

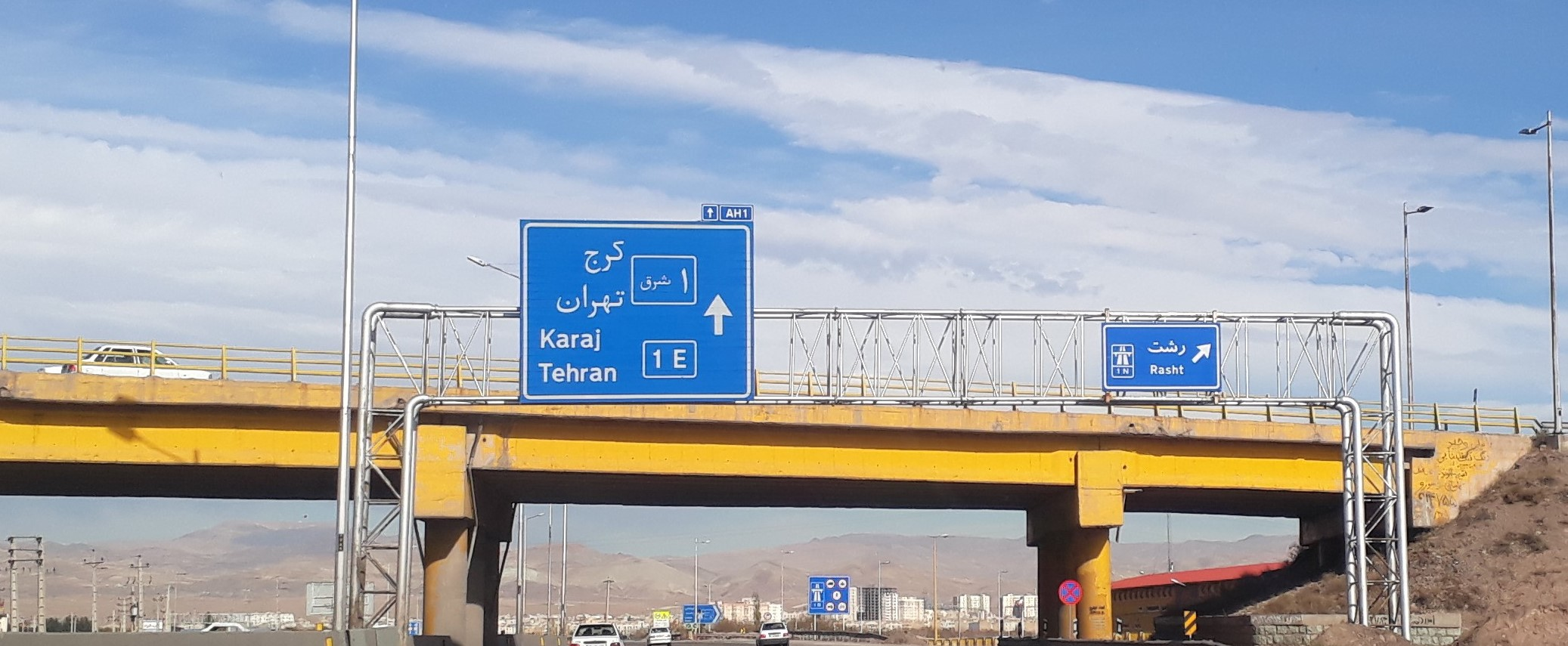
Qazvin-Rasht Freeway intersection bridge on Zanjan-Qazvin freeway in Iran

- : Islam Qala - Taybad
- : Taybad- Sang Bast
- : Sang Bast - Nishapur - Sabzevar - Shahrood - Damghan - Semnan - Deh Namak
- : Deh Namak - Aradan
- : Aradan - Tehran
- : Tehran - Qazvin - Zanjan - Tabriz - Sufian
- : Sufian - Bazargan

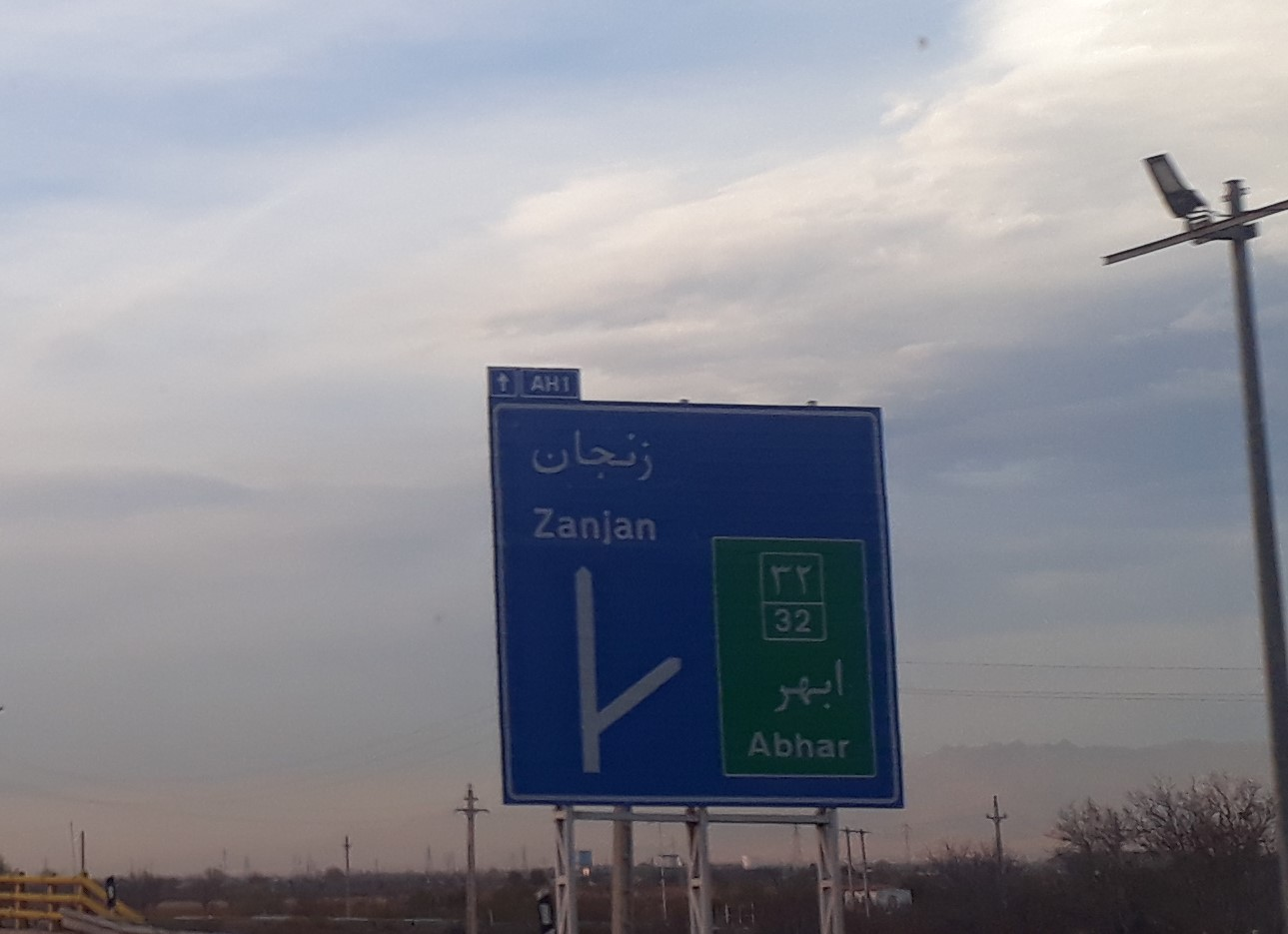
Abhar exit on Qazvin-Zanjan freeway in Iran

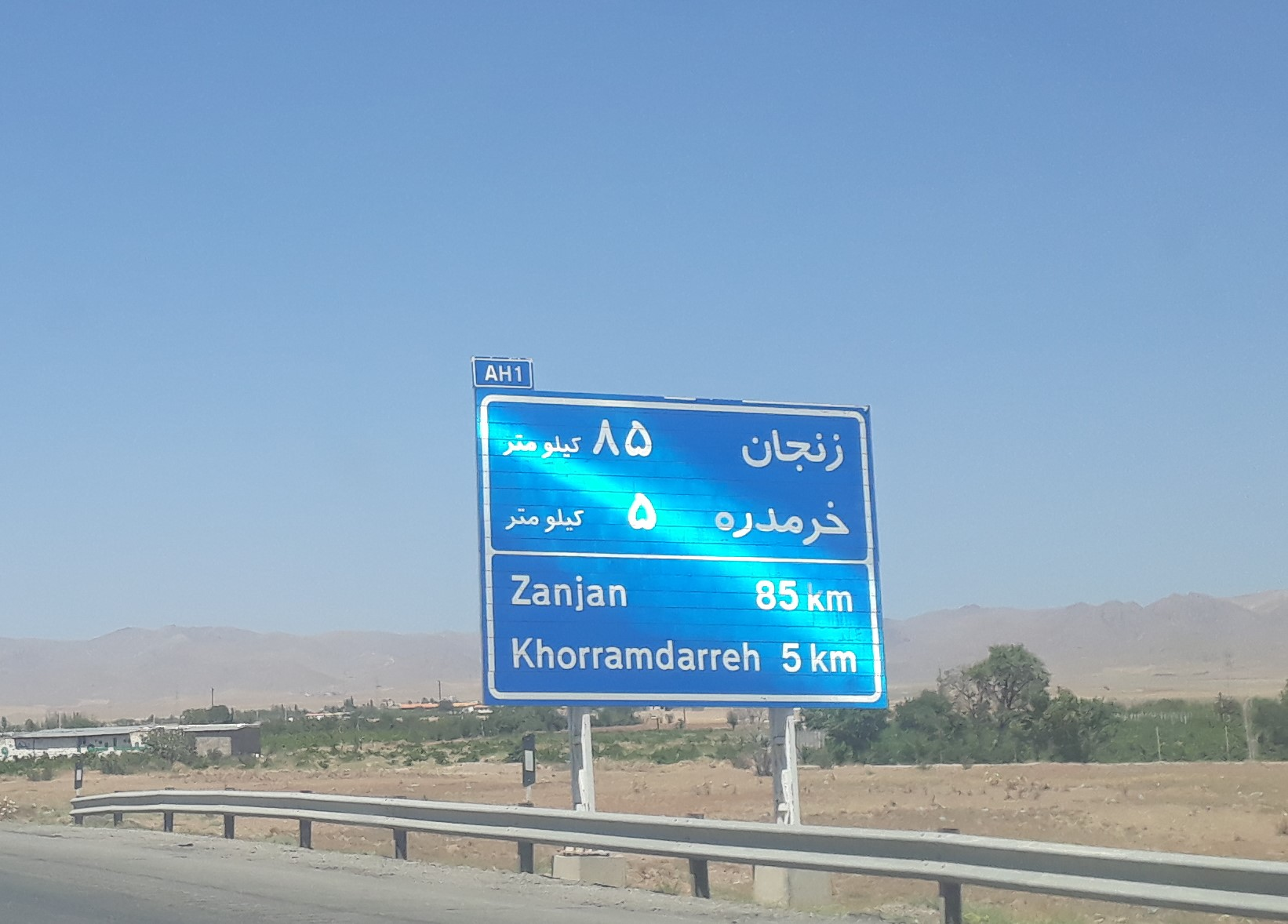
Qazvin Zanjan Freeway in Khorramdarreh County-Zanjan in Iran

=== Turkey ===
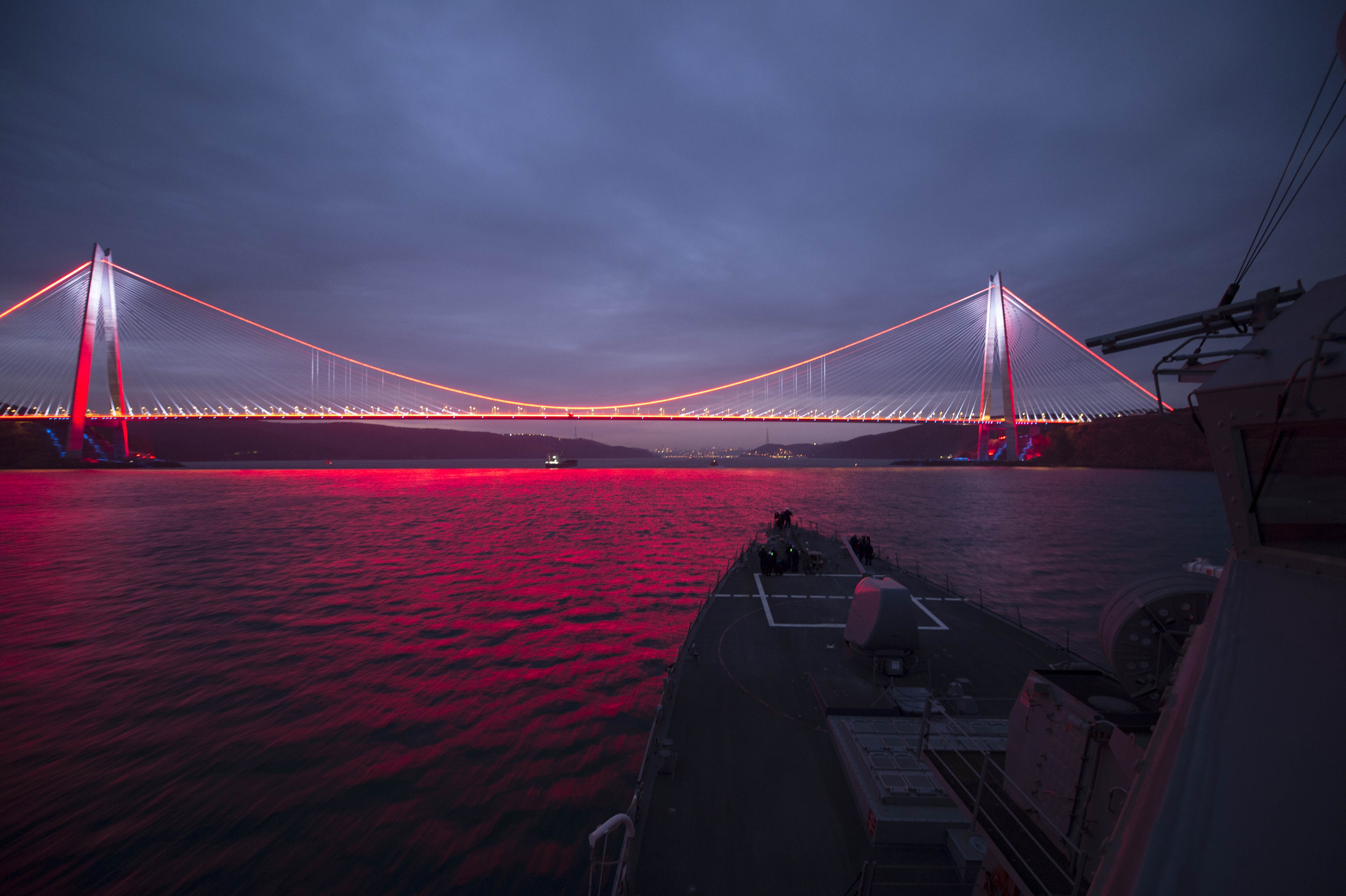
Yavuz Sultan Selim Bridge

- E80 / D.100 Road D100: Gürbulak - Doğubayazıt - Aşkale - Refahiye
- E88 / D.200 Road D200: Refahiye - Sivas - Ankara
- E90 / E89 / O-20: Ankara
- E89 / E80 / O-4 Otoyol 4: Ankara - Gerede - Istanbul
- E80 / O-7 Otoyol 7: Istanbul
- E80 / O-3 Otoyol 3: Istanbul - Edirne - - Kapıkule (Bulgaria, Maritsa motorway)

=== Connection to E80 ===
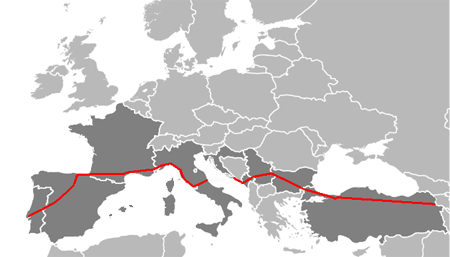
E80 across southern Europe

The route AH1 links to E80 in Turkey. The E80 continues in the E-road network from the border station at Gürbulak in Turkey to Istanbul followed by E80 highways to Kapitan Andreevo/Kapıkule, Sofia, Niš, Pristina, Dubrovnik, Pescara, Rome, Genoa, Nice, Toulouse, Burgos, Valladolid, Salamanca and finally Lisbon on the Atlantic Ocean.
