= Numaligarh =

- town
- Location in Assam, India Numaligarh (India)
- Coordinates: 26°38′N 93°45′E
- Country: India
- State: Assam
- District: Golaghat

Languages
  - Official: Assamese, English
- Time zone: UTC+5:30 (IST)
- Pin Cord: 785615
- ISO 3166 code: IN-AS
- Vehicle registration: AS 05

Numaligarh is a town in the Golaghat district of Assam, India. It is situated at a distance of 32 km from Golaghat town, 265 km from Guwahati, 51 km from Jorhat and 6 km from Morangi.

== Numaligarh Refinery ==
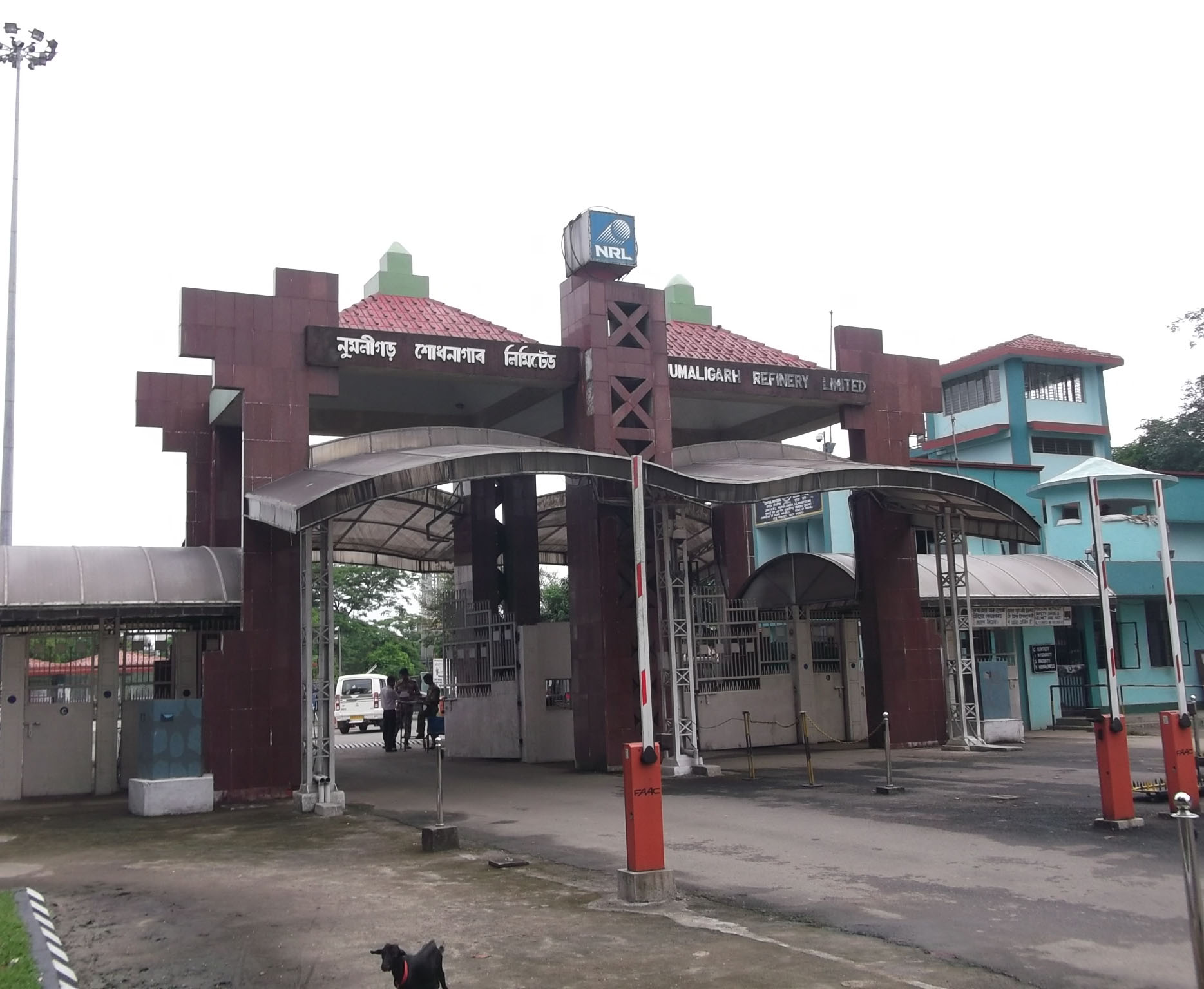
Numaligarh Refinery

A petroleum refinery named Numaligarh Refinery Limited has been established in 2001. Numaligarh Refinery Limited is one of the major refineries in north east region of India, having a capacity of 3 MMT. Numaligarh Refinery Limited is a joint venture of Assam Government (12.35%) owned Numaligarh Refinery Limited with Bharat Petroleum Corporation Limited (61.65%) and Oil India Limited (26%).

== Tourism attractions ==
A few kilometers away from Numaligarh, the Babathan named a Shiv Temple is situated. The Dhanshiri River passes through the city. There is also a butterfly garden in Numaligarh. Approximately 5 km away from Numaligarh, the ancient Deopahar archaeological site is situated which is protected archaeological park cum site museum and a place to visit.

== Transport ==
The National Highway 715 (India) known as NH 37(old name) and National Highway 129 (India) known as NH 39(old name) passes through Numaligarh. It has a bus stop but no government bus station. The nearest railway station is in Golaghat and the nearest airport is in Jorhat.
