= Yangon–Mandalay Expressway =

Road in Myanmar

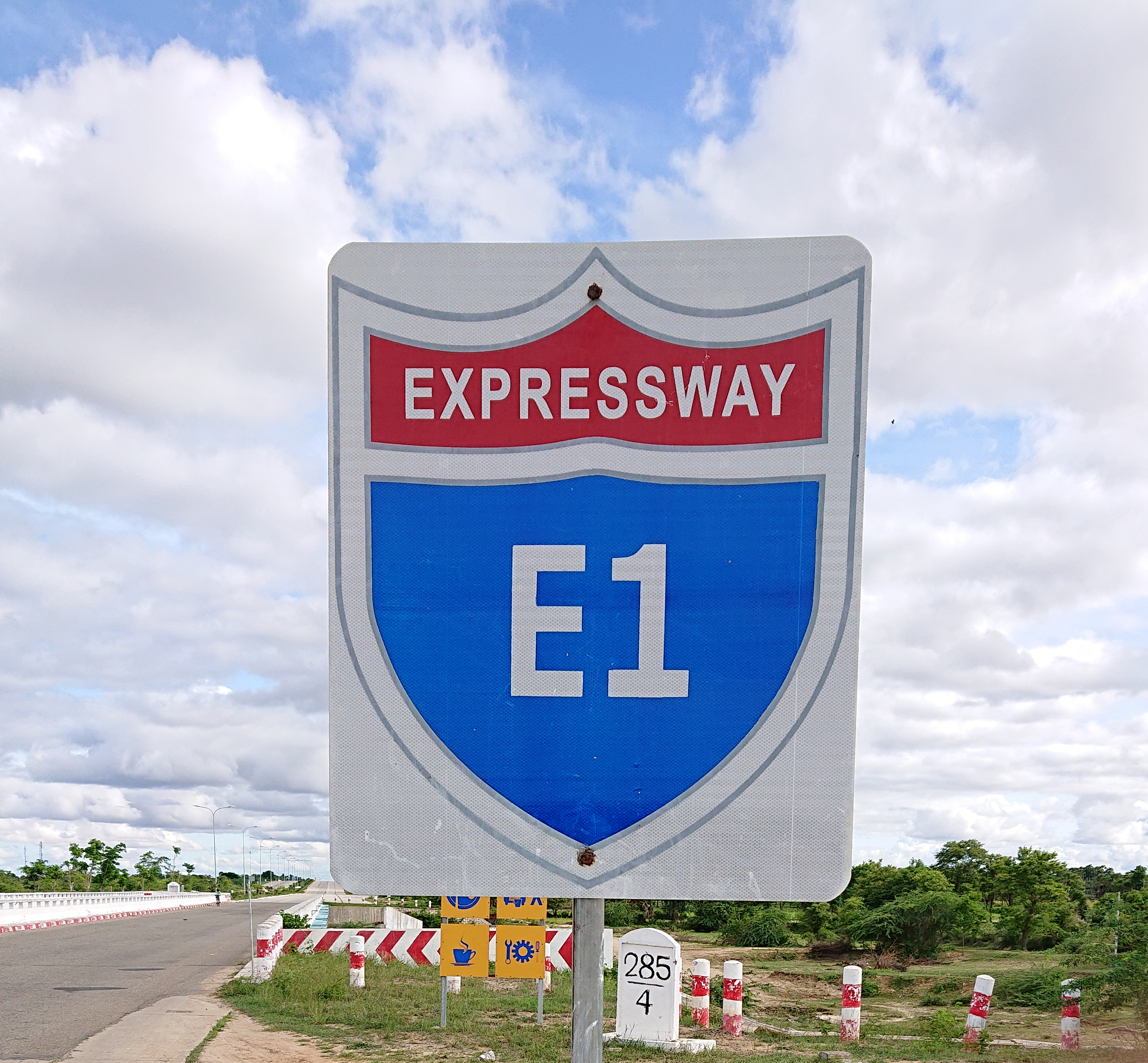
Yangon–Mandalay Expressway
- ရန်ကုန်–မန္တလေး အမြန်လမ်း
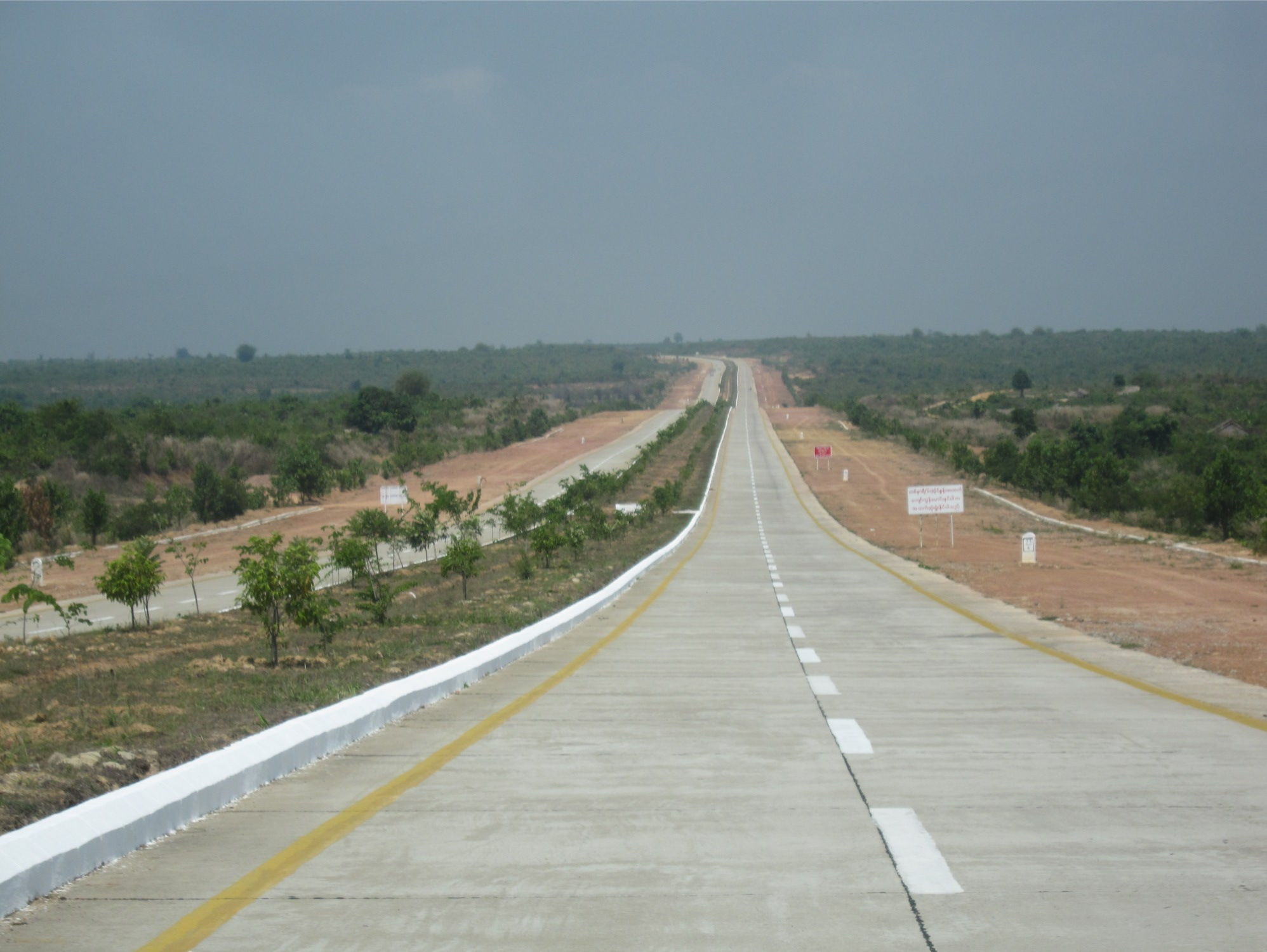

Route information
- Part of AH1 AH2
- Length: 586.7 km (364.6 mi)
- Existed: December 2010–present

Major junctions
- South end: Yangon
- North end: Mandalay

Location
- Country: Myanmar
- Major cities: Bago, Taungoo, Naypyidaw, Meiktila, Mandalay

Highway system
- Transport in Myanmar

The Yangon–Mandalay Expressway (Burmese: ရန်ကုန်–မန္တလေး အမြန်လမ်း), designated as E1, is a tolled expressway in Myanmar (Burma) that connects the country's largest city Yangon and second largest city Mandalay. Opened in December 2010, the 587 km (365 mi) expressway has reduced the travel time between Yangon and Mandalay to 7 hours from 13 hours by train and from 16 hours by the old highway. The highway, which does not meet international design, construction and safety standards, has seen a spate of accidents since its opening.

== History ==
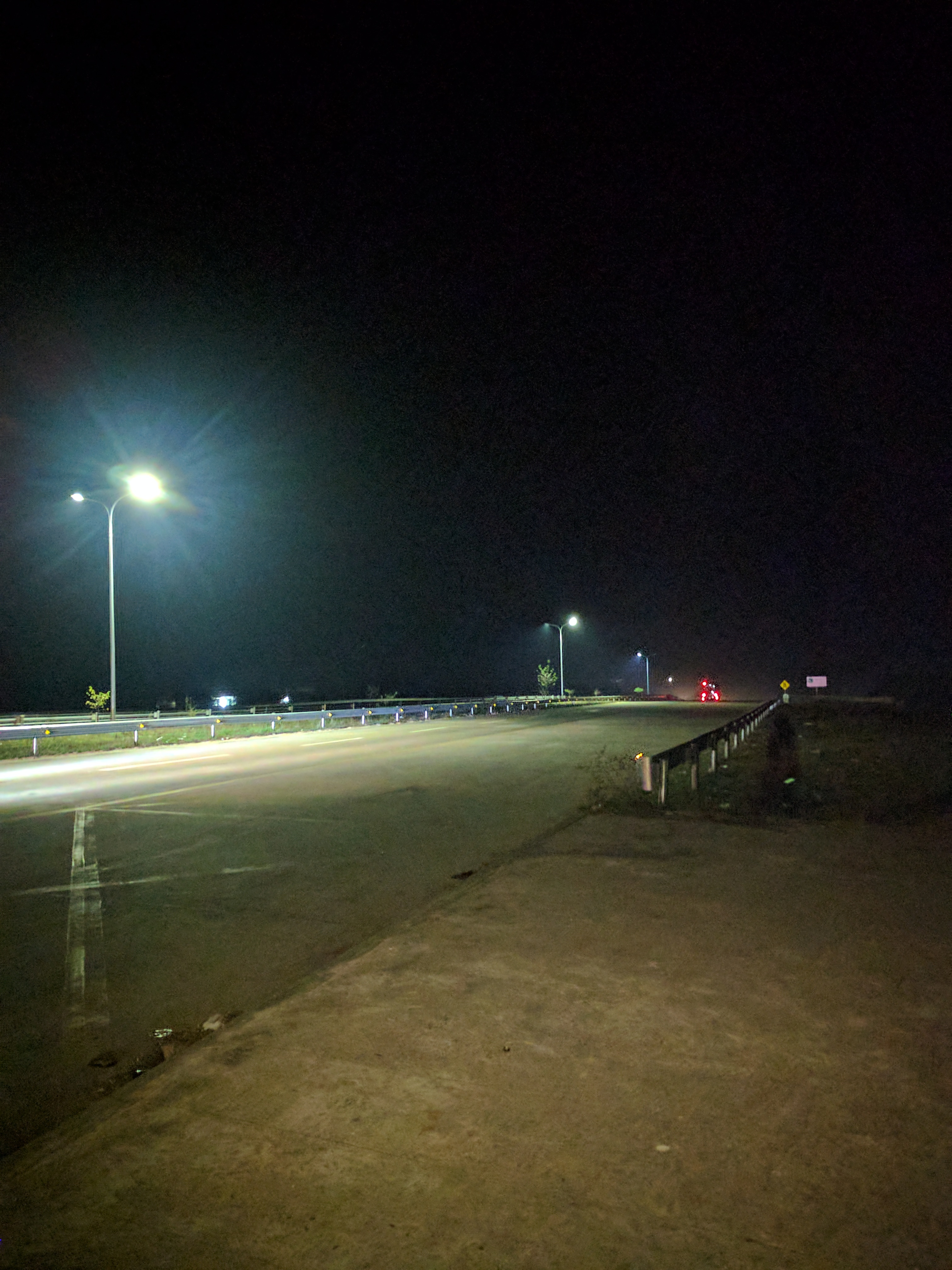
Night view of Expressway

The initial plans to build a highway between the two largest cities of the country were conceived in 1954 as part of the U Nu government's Pyidawtha Plan. In 1959, the United States offered financial and technical assistance for a "preliminary engineering survey" of the highway. The financial assistance was up to $750,000. When the survey was completed in 1960, the Burmese government balked at the cost as too expensive. In 1961, the US government agreed to finance another study of more economical alternatives. The survey work began in early 1962 but was only completed in December after having been delayed by the 1962 military coup by the Union Revolutionary Council in March 1962. The military government initially agreed to the new proposal, and authorized the design of the Yangon–Pegu stretch of the highway in March 1963. The design plans were ready by December 1963 but were never carried out. They fell victim to the deteriorating relations between the US and Burmese governments.

The proposed road route lay between the old Yangon–Mandalay Highway and the Pegu Yoma Mountains. The Pegu Yoma Mountains were a strategically important location for the Communist Party of Burma. After the expulsion of the Communists from the area in 1973, the government planned the construction of the expressway. The government received a cement factory in Kyangin as development aid from Japan for the construction of the expressway. However, it had to export the cement from the new factory and due to the lack of foreign exchange abroad construction was cancelled.

After the 8888 Uprising, the new military regime intensified private sector and infrastructure projects. New cement factories and steel production facilities were built by the state and private companies. To finance the foreign exchange, the government received in return for gas export to Thailand. In October 2005, construction began, and on 29 December 2010, the official opening of the entire route took place.

== Phases ==
The expressway was inaugurated by the Ministry of Construction and the Directorate of Military Engineering of the Ministry of Defence.

=== Yangon–Naypyidaw ===
- Construction period: October 2005 – March 2009
- Opened: 25 March 2009
- Track length: 325 kilometres (202 mi)
- Number of bridges over 60 metres (200 ft): 40

=== Naypyidaw–Mandalay ===
- Construction period: 2007 – December 2010
- Opened: 29 March 2010
- Track length: 240 kilometres (149 mi)
- Number of bridges over 60 metres (200 ft): 32

=== Mandalay (Saga-in)–Mandalay (Tagundaing) ===
- Building time: 2010 – December 2011
- Opened: 30 December 2011
- Track length: 21.7 kilometres (13.5 mi)
- Number of bridges over 60 metres (200 ft): ?

== Specifications ==
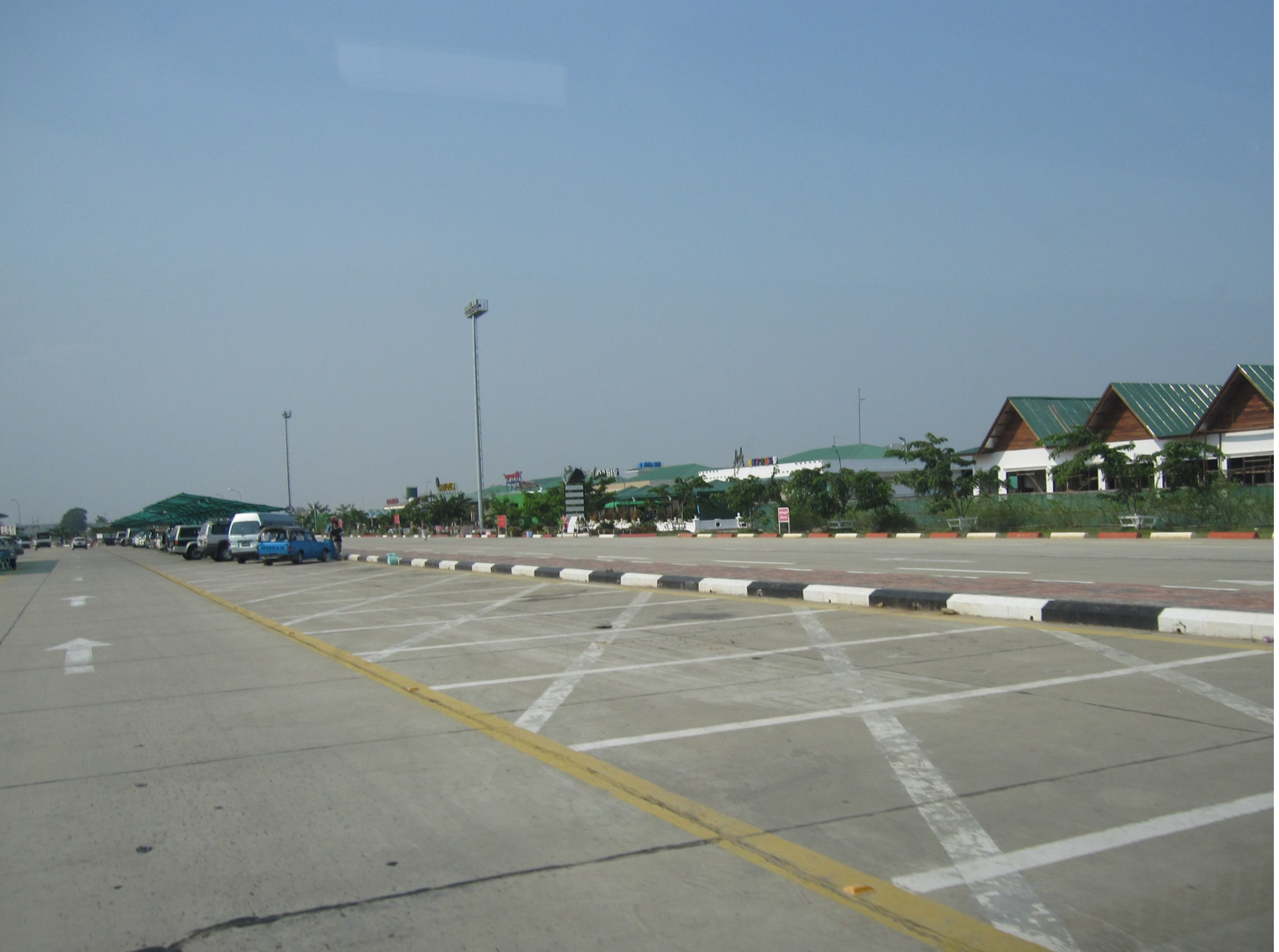
Rest area at 115-mile (185 km) junction

The road surface comprises two layers of concrete: (1) an 8.2 m (27 ft) wide and 15 cm (6 in) thick lower layer, as well as (2) an 7.6 m (25 ft) wide, 30 cm (12 in) thick upper layer. The road can withstand 80 tons. The highway has two 7.6 m (25 ft) wide carriageways, divided by 9.1 m (30 ft) wide traffic islands, and a total of 842 box culverts, 1396 bridges and 116 underpasses. The speed limit is 100 km/h (60 mph).

=== Tolls ===
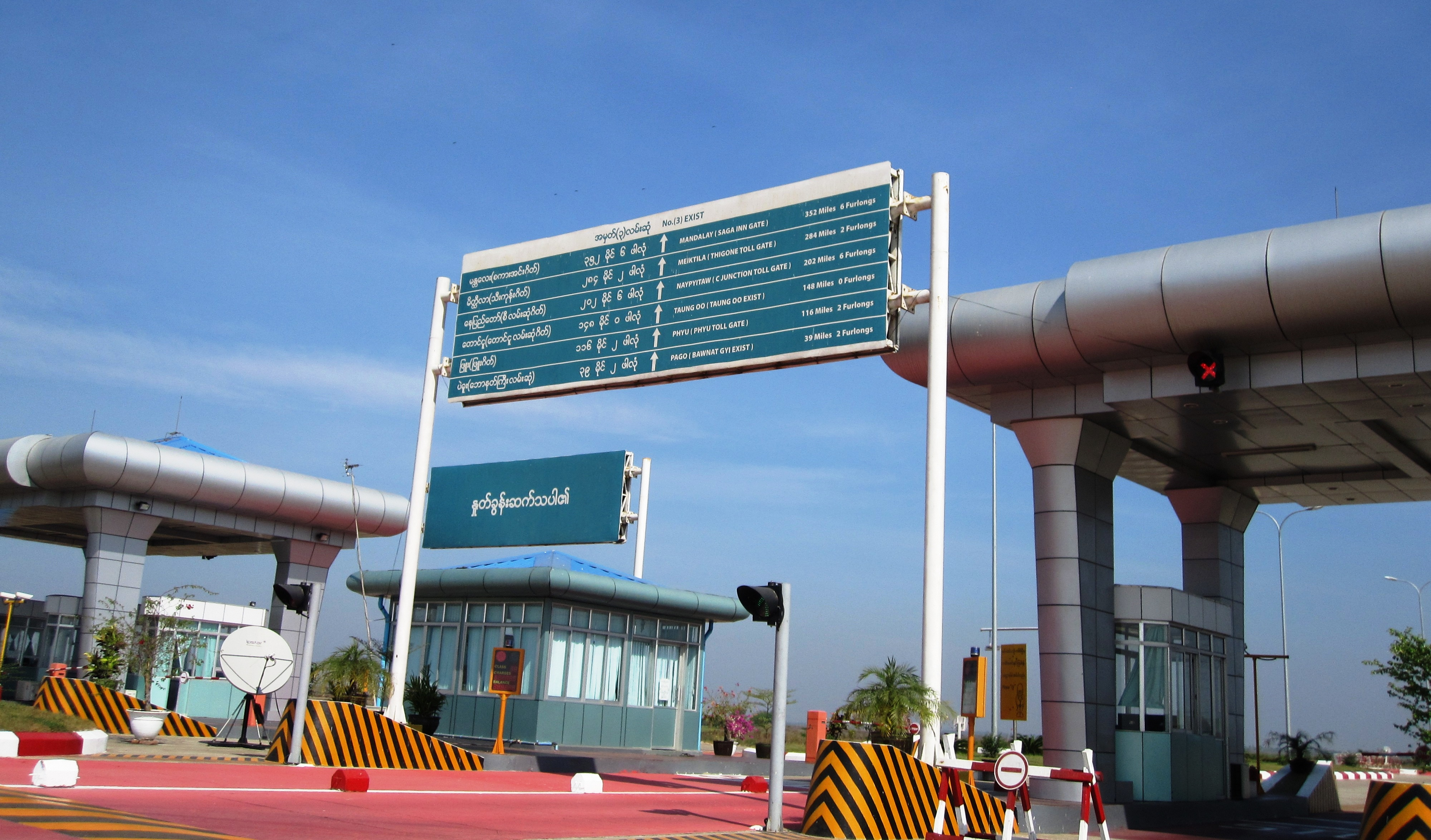
Naypyidaw toll station

The five toll stations of the expressway are located in Yangon, Pyu, Naypyidaw, Meiktila and Mandalay. Tolls range from 4,500 kyats for cars to 22,500 kyats for buses for the journey between Yangon and Mandalay. Trucks are not allowed on the highway.

== Standardization ==
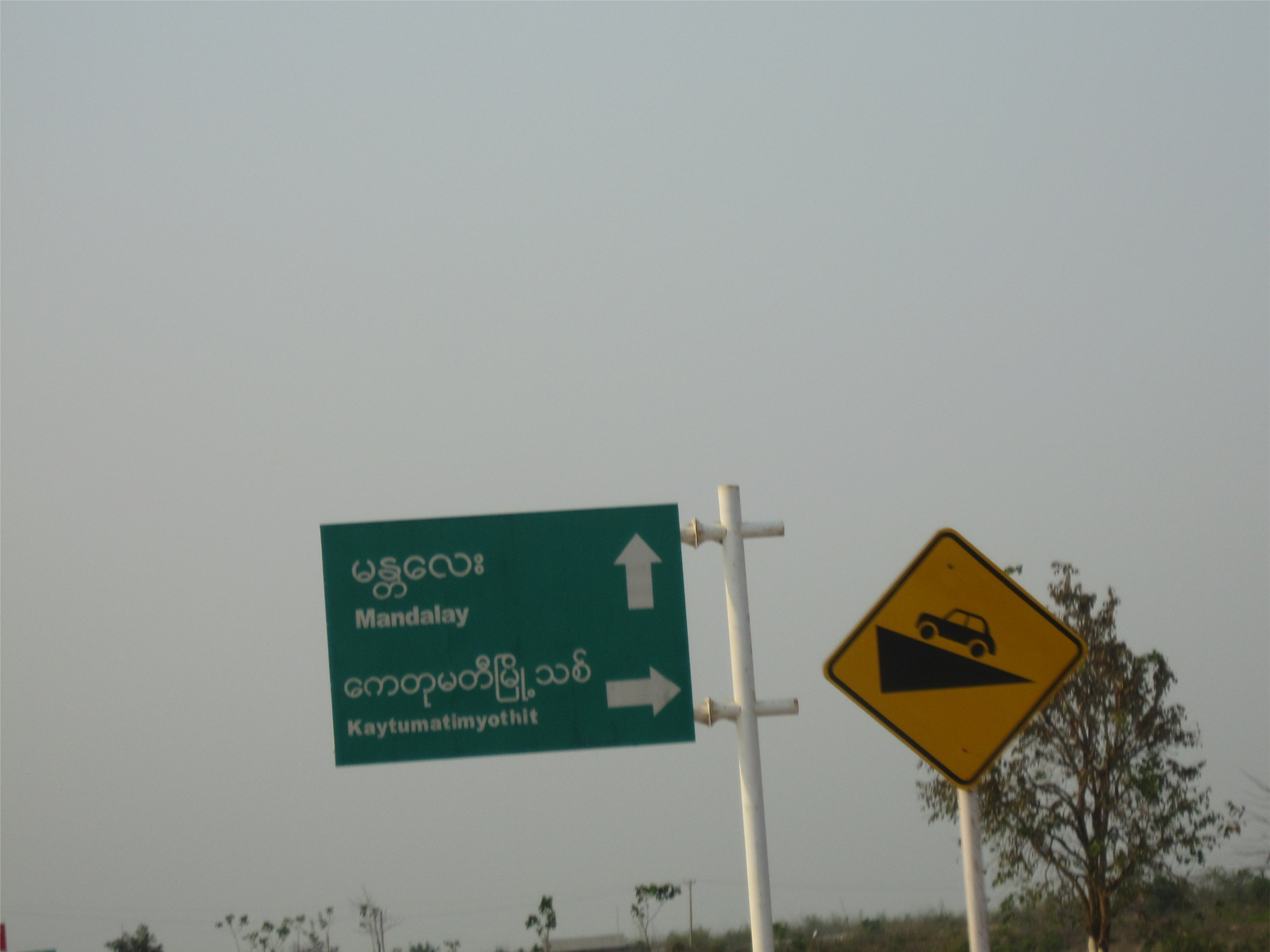
Traffic signs along the highway

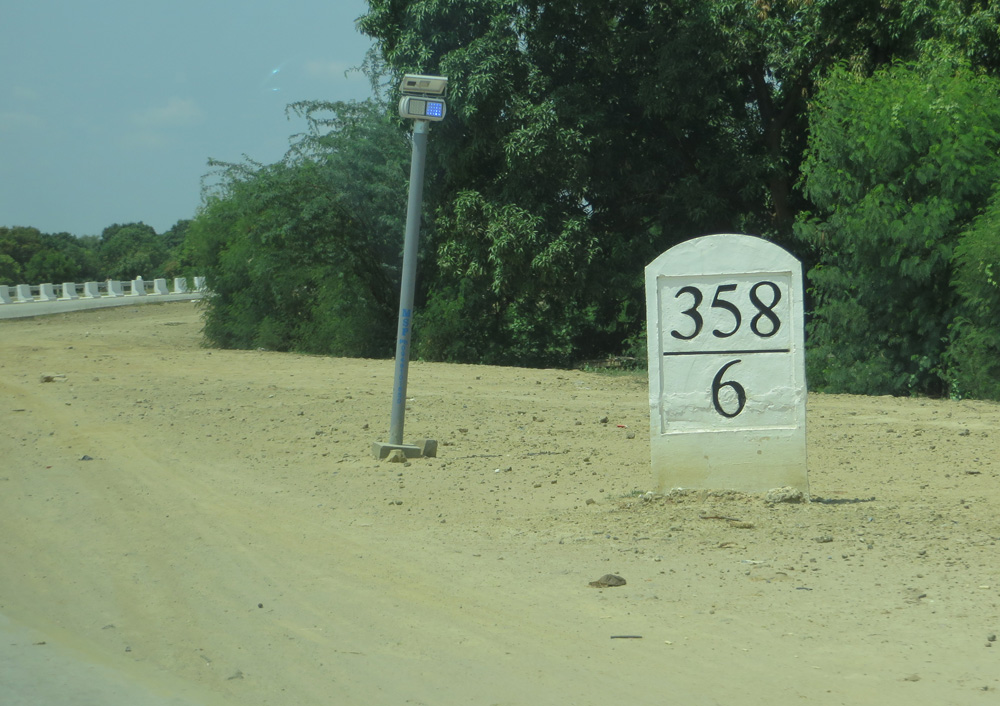
Mileposts on the YME use miles followed by furlongs (one-eighth of a mile)

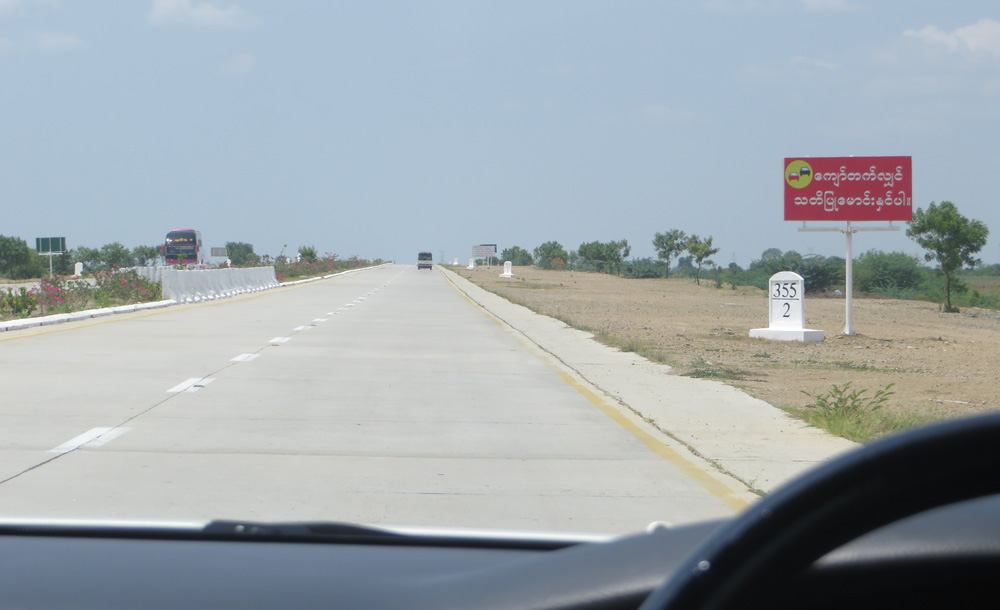
Milepost 355-2 south of Mandalay

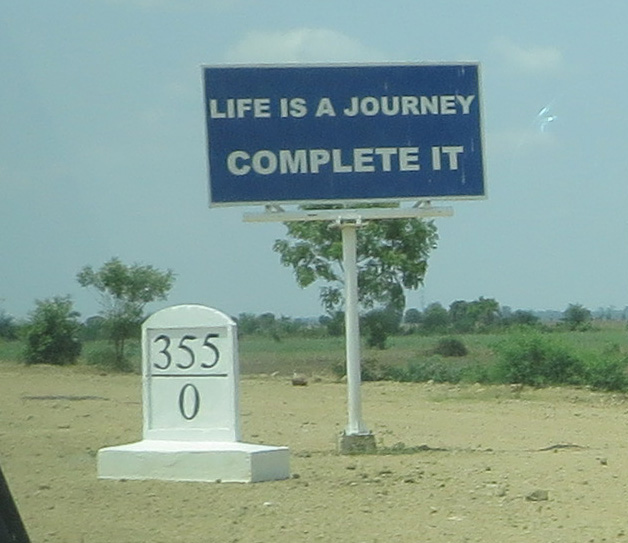
Safety message at Mile 355 south of Mandalay

The highway traffic signs do not comply with international standards. The highway's curves are not built for banked turns, making turns more treacherous than necessary. According to exile-run news agencies The Irrawaddy and Mizzima, such failures may result in numerous accidents on the curves. Similarly, there are many accidents during the extension of the highway because there is no exit provided brake strip. It has been dubbed the "Death Highway" by some news agencies. According to police records, excessive speed is a major cause of accidents. Other causes include unsafe vehicles, the condition of the road surface and negligent driving.

Rest areas, police stations and gas stations do not meet international standards. Many drivers are inexperienced when driving on highways, as well as lack sufficient knowledge of the Highway Code.

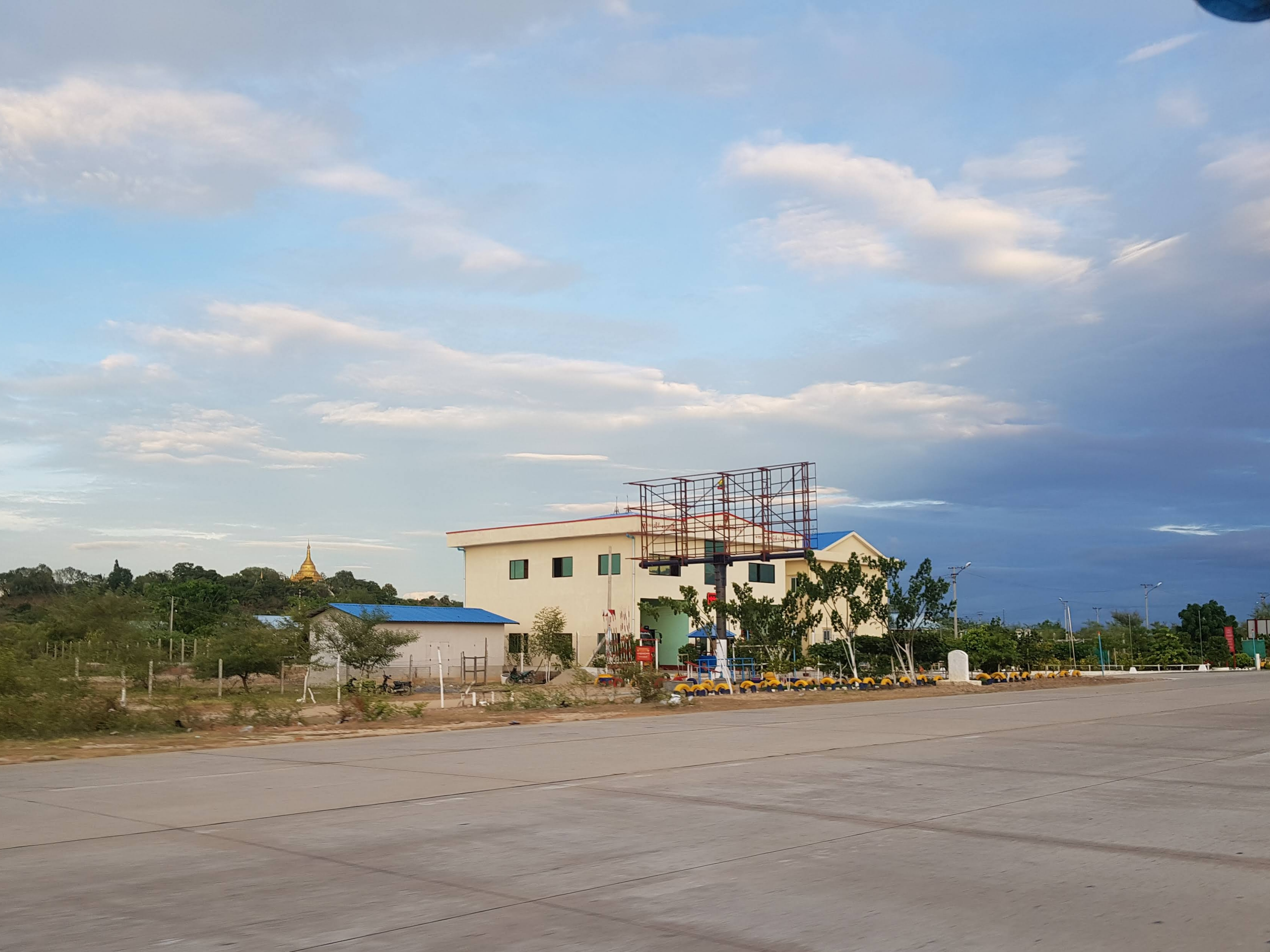
Highway Fire Station near Mandalay

== Possible extension ==
In 2014, the government plans to widen the road after many accidents on the expressway. The government has requested assistance from the USAID, JICA and KOICA to upgrade the road and widen it to eight lanes.
