= Pulibor =

- Interactive map of Pulibor
- Coordinates: 26.7379238°N 94.1567605°E
- Country: India
- State: Assam
- Region: Upper - Assam

Pulibor is a village in Golaghat district of Assam state of India. About 1 km from pulibor in bogorijeng village there is Golaghat District Jail.

== History ==
On 3 September 1939 the World War-II started as soon as Great Britain and France officially declared war against aggressive Nazi Germany. In that war, the Congress party under the leadership of Mahatma Gandhi, extended support to the Allied forces while Azad Hind Fouz led by Netaji Subhash Chandra Bose resolved to free India with the help of the Axis force consisting of Germany, Italy and Japan. The Azad Hind Fouz was able to march up to Moirang, Kohima and Ukhrul in Manipur behind the Japanese forces. They arrived at Imphal in March 1944.

At that moment the British and its Allies set up a military cantonment and an aerodrome at Bogorijeng, which is located 5 km north from the present Golaghat town. In order to cater to the need of food supply to the military personnel, the British established a huge animal husbandry farm at Chinatoli.

A period, which was marked by poor surface communication links, the Allied forces transported arms and ammunition through the waterways of Dhansiri river which is just a few km west of Bogorijeng. A meter gauge railway line from Mariani to Furkating had in the meantime been completed and another sub-track from Halmira Saiding to the Bogorijeng camp was opened later on. This 7 km-long railway line is now completely abandoned but has remained intact. In fact 10 RCC bridges are still standing strong as relics of those bygone times. The Second World War ended in 1945 and the military base at Bogorijeng was also closed down. But the abandoned railway line and aerodrome, along with a war-ravaged fighter plane, was lying on the surface till the 1960s.

Local elderly citizens revealed the fact that during the Indo-China war in 1962, the iron and steel material of the ill-fated aircraft and railway tracks were collected from this site by some government personnel. Today, the 4 km stretch of abandoned railway line is used as a public road by local people of nearby Noragaon, Jogibari, Na-bheta and Bogorijeng villages.

== Education ==
- Golaghat Engineering College
- Residential Girl's Polytechnic
- Pulibor Adarsha Vidyapith

== Transportation ==
Air: Rowriah Airport is the nearest airport.

Rail: The main railway junction of Golaghat is at Furkating, which is around 10 kilometers from Pulibor.

Road: Pulibor is connected to Golaghat via PHG Path that also connects towards dergaon. A bypass has been created that connects via pulibor towards dergaon from rangajan which is connected with Asian highway 1 for further expansion of Golaghat town area.
