= Directorate of Archaeology =

State agency of Punjab, India

The Directorate of Archaeology is responsible for about 10 museums in the state of Punjab, India. It has responsibility for all excavations.
