= Morangi =

Rural area in Assam, India

Morangi is a big rural area in Golaghat district of Assam situated at a distance of 12 km of Golaghat Town. It was the headquarters of Morangi Khua Guhai during the Ahom era.
