= Kaziranga National Park =

National park in the state of Assam, India

- IUCN category II (national park)
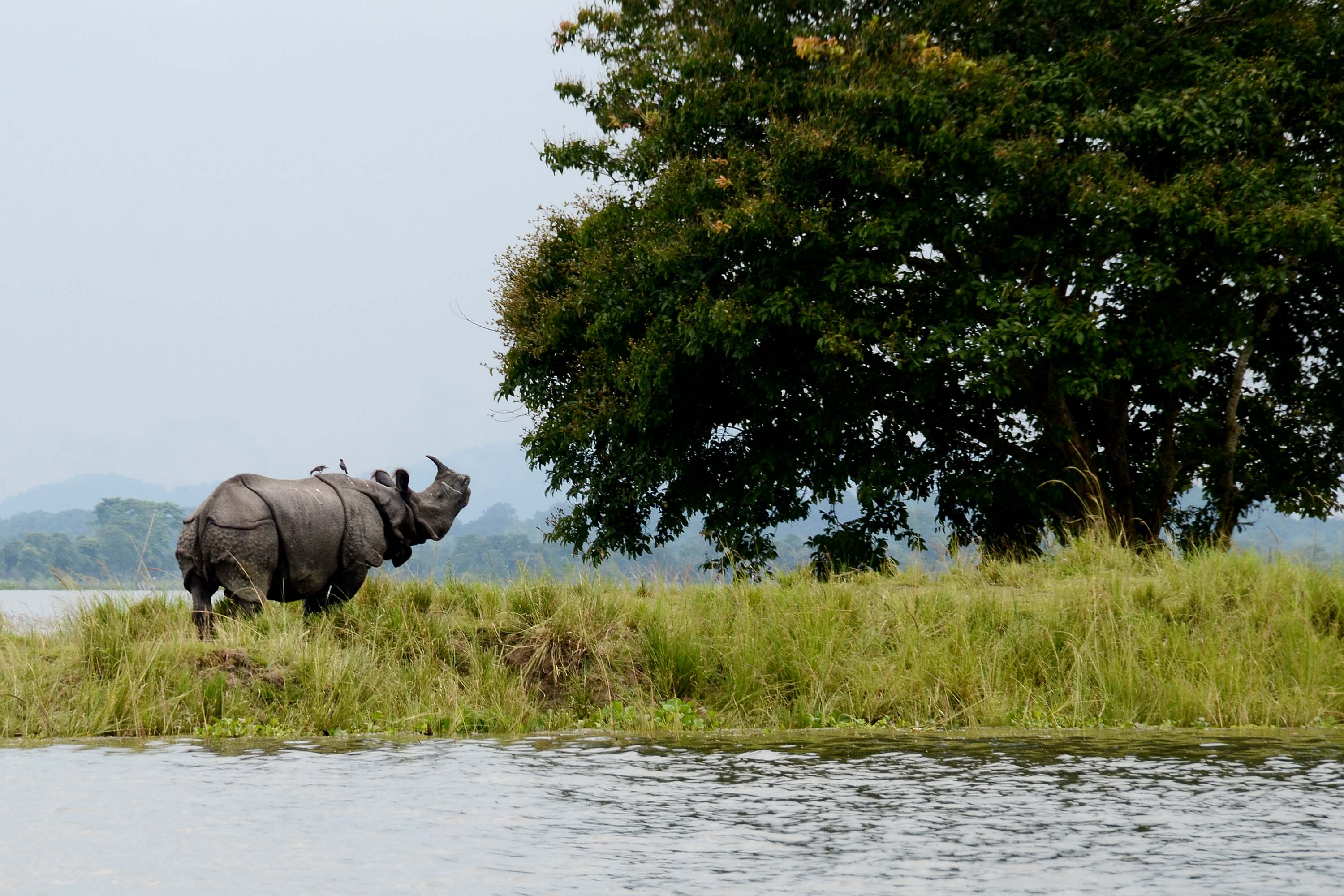
- Indian rhinoceros in Kaziranga National Park

- Location within Assam Location within India
- Interactive map of Kaziranga National Park
- Location: Golaghat and Nagaon districts, Assam, India
- Nearest city: Golaghat
- Coordinates: 26°40′N 93°21′E
- Area: 1,090 km^{2} (420 sq mi)
- Established: 1 June 1905; 121 years ago 11 February 1974; 52 years ago (as national park)
- Governing body: Government of Assam; Government of India
- Website: https://kaziranga.nptr.in/

UNESCO World Heritage Site
- Type: Natural
- Criteria: ix, x
- Designated: 1985 (9th session)
- Reference no.: 337
- Region: Asia

Kaziranga National Park is a national park and World Heritage Site in the Golaghat, Sonitpur, Biswanath and Nagaon districts of the Indian state of Assam. Located on the edge of the Brahmaputra River, it encompasses dense tropical moist broadleaf forests interspersed with tall elephant grass and marshland surrounding numerous beels. This habitat hosts populations of the Indian rhinoceros, Asian elephant, wild water buffalo, swamp deer, tiger and fishing cat. It is recognized as an Important Bird Area and was declared a Tiger Reserve in 2006.

Kaziranga National Park has been the theme of several books, songs, and documentaries. It celebrated its centennial in 2005 after its establishment in 1905 as a reserve forest.

== Etymology ==
Although the etymology of the name Kaziranga is not certain, there exist a number of possible explanations derived from local legends and records. According to one legend, a girl named Rawnga, from a nearby village, and a youth named Kazi, from Karbi Anglong, fell in love. This match was not acceptable to their families, and the couple disappeared into the forest, never to be seen again, and the forest was named after them.

Testimony to the long history of the name can be found in some records, which state that once, while the Ahom king Pratap Singha was passing by the region during the seventeenth century, he was particularly impressed by the taste of fish, and on asking was told it came from Kaziranga. Kaziranga also could mean the "Land of red goats (Deer)", as the word Kazi in the Karbi language means "goat", and Rangai means "red".

== History ==
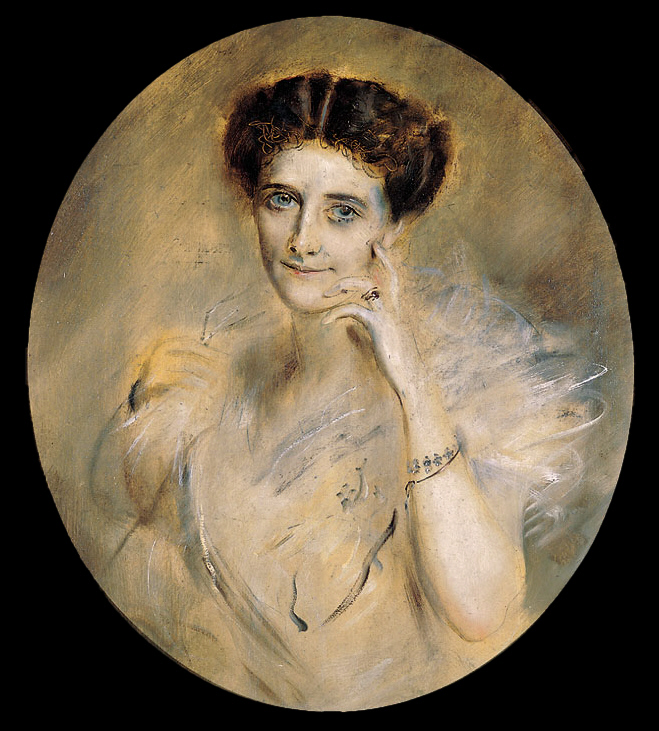
Mary Curzon, Baroness Curzon of Kedleston and her husband are credited with starting the movement to protect this area.

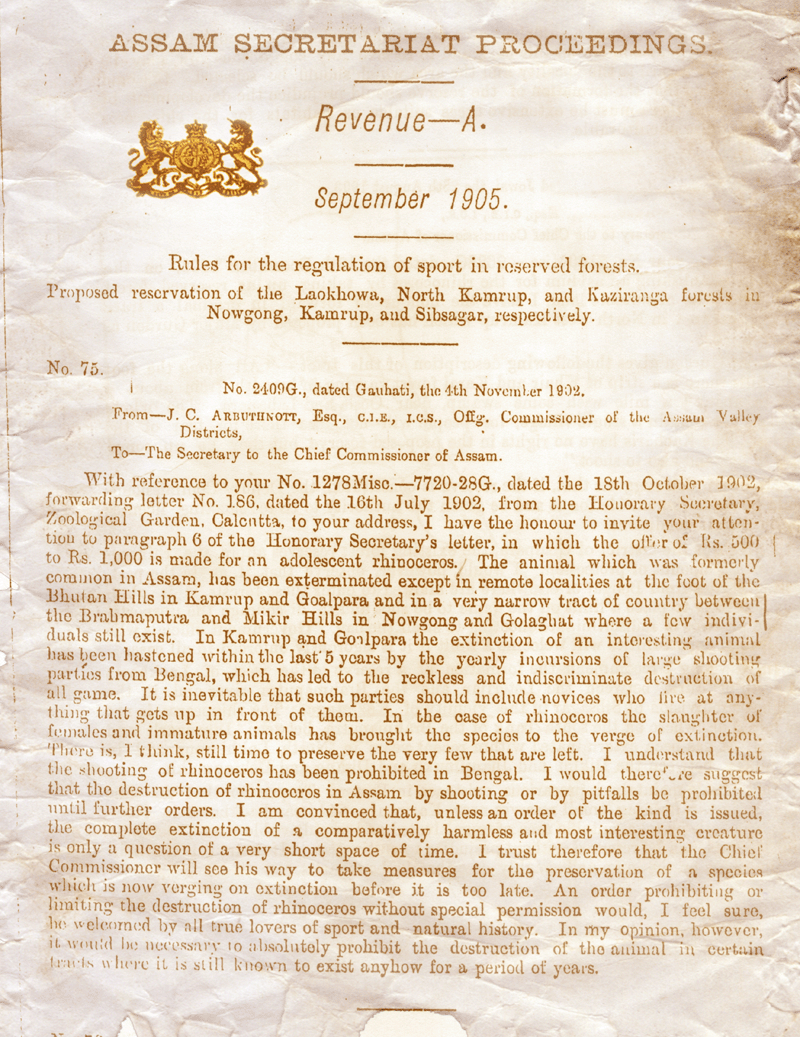
The proposal for the establishment of the Kaziranga Reserve Forest dated September 1905

The history of Kaziranga as a protected area can be traced back to 1904, when Mary Curzon, Baroness Curzon of Kedleston visited the area. After failing to see an Indian rhinoceros, for which the area was renowned, she persuaded her husband to take urgent measures to protect the dwindling species, which he did by initiating planning for its protection. On 1 June 1905, the Kaziranga Proposed Reserve Forest was created with an area of 232 km^{2} (90 sq mi).

Kaziranga Game Sanctuary was renamed Kaziranga Wildlife Sanctuary in 1950 to rid the name of hunting connotations.

Kaziranga National Park has experienced several natural and human-made calamities including major floods caused by the overflow of the Brahmaputra, leading to significant losses of wildlife. In 2024, six dead rhinos along with hundreds of deer were tallied as drowned by the rising water.

A separatist movement in Assam led by the United Liberation Front of Asom has crippled the economy of the region. However, Kaziranga National Park has remained unaffected by the movement; indeed, instances of rebels from the United Liberation Front of Assam protecting the wildlife and killing poachers have been reported since the 1980s.

== Geography ==
Map of Kaziranga National Park. River courses and lake areas vary annually. River courses are not drawn completely outside park boundaries

Kaziranga is located between latitudes 26°30' N and 26°45' N, and longitudes 93°08' E to 93°36' E within three districts in the Indian state of Assam—the Kaliabor subdivision of Nagaon district, Bokajan subdivision of Karbi Anglong and the Bokakhat subdivision of Golaghat district.

The park is approximately 40 km (25 mi) in length from east to west, and 13 km (8.1 mi) in breadth from north to south. Kaziranga covers an area of 378 km^{2} (146 sq mi), with approximately 51.14 km^{2} (19.75 sq mi) lost to erosion in recent years. A total addition of 429 km^{2} (166 sq mi) along the present boundary of the park has been made and designated with separate national park status to provide extended habitat for increasing the population of wildlife or, as a corridor for safe movement of animals to Karbi Anglong Hills. The park area is circumscribed by the Brahmaputra River, which forms the northern and eastern boundaries, and the Mora Diphlu, which forms the southern boundary. Other notable rivers within the park are the Diphlu and Mora Dhansiri.

The landscape consists of exposed sandbars, riverine flood-formed lakes known as, beels, and elevated regions known as, chapories, which provide retreats and shelter for animals during floods. Many artificial chapories have been built with the help of the Indian Army to ensure the safety of the animals. Kaziranga is one of the largest tracts of protected land in the sub-Himalayan belt, and due to the presence of highly diverse and visible species, has been described as a "biodiversity hotspot".

=== Climate ===
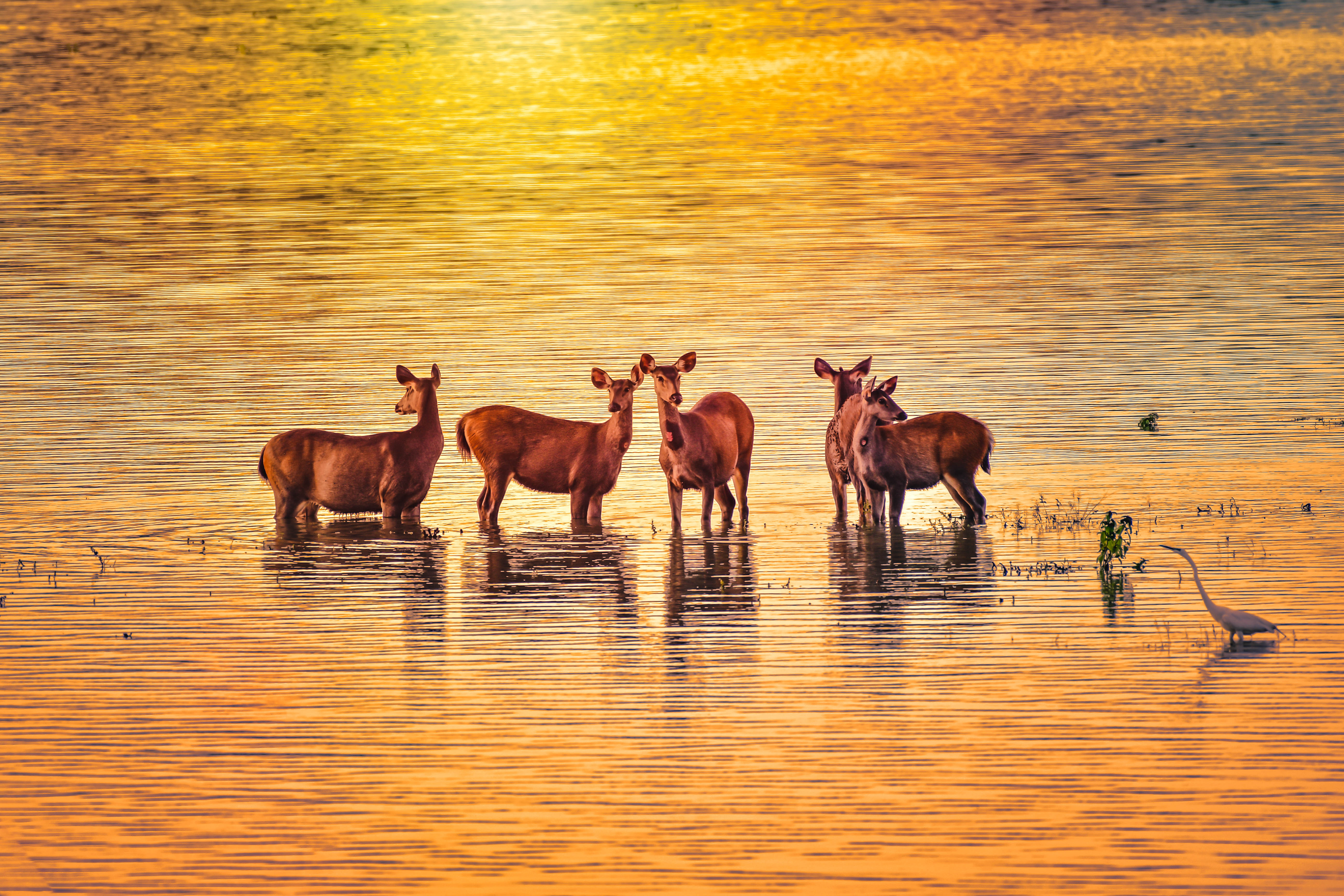
Sambar deer in Kaziranga National Park

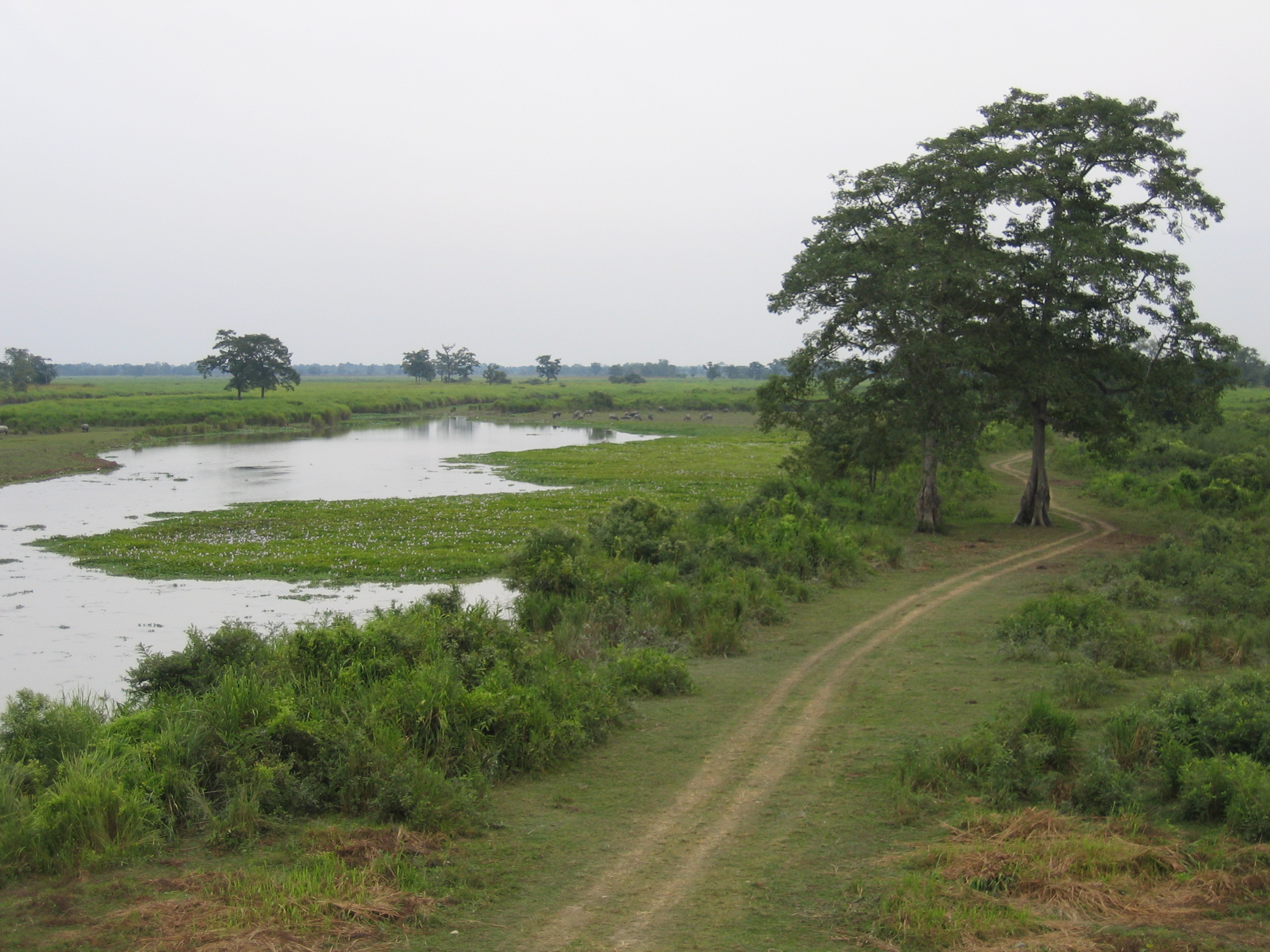
Flooded grasslands in Kaziranga with elephant and jeep trails nearby

During this season, beels and nullahs (water channels) dry up. The rainy monsoon season lasts from June to September, and is responsible for most of Kaziranga's annual rainfall of 2,220 mm (87 in). During the peak months of July and August, three-fourths of the western region of the park is submerged, due to the rising water level of the Brahmaputra. Each time a flood comes, 70%-80% percent of the national park is inundated for 5–10 days at a time. The flooding causes most animals to migrate to elevated and forested regions outside the southern border of the park, such as the Mikir Hills. 540 animals, including 13 rhinos and mostly hog deer perished in unprecedented floods of 2012. However, occasional dry spells create problems as well, such as food shortages and occasional forest fires.

Seasonal variations in the vegetation and habitat of the animal is notable in the park. During winter the shallow beels and nullahs (small water channel) dry up and the growth of short grasses cover up their beds. The grasses also grow around the perennial beels. With the end of the monsoon season, herbivorous animals, especially the rhinoceros, rush into these areas for grazing. In the other parts of the park, the tall coarse grasses dry up by the month of December and January and are then control-burnt by the park staff. After such burning, some animals begin to concentrate in the burnt patches and relish the ash and the partially burnt stems of the reeds. With few winter showers fresh grass blades shoot up in the burnt patches attracting larger number of animals to these areas. With the onset of the summer season, the grasses in the burnt patches grow up quickly and the tender shoots turn into coarse blades, which no longer attract the animals. The temperature also rises, and the animals prefer to remain near the water sources, especially around the numerous perennial beels and water streams inside the park. During the monsoon, the shallow beels and the nullahs start to get filled up, first by the monsoon showers and later by the floodwaters. The animals gradually start moving towards higher grounds, which are situated around the forests. When the flood water covers most of the areas, the animals migrate to the nearby Karbi Anglong Hills and other adjoining areas.

== Flora ==
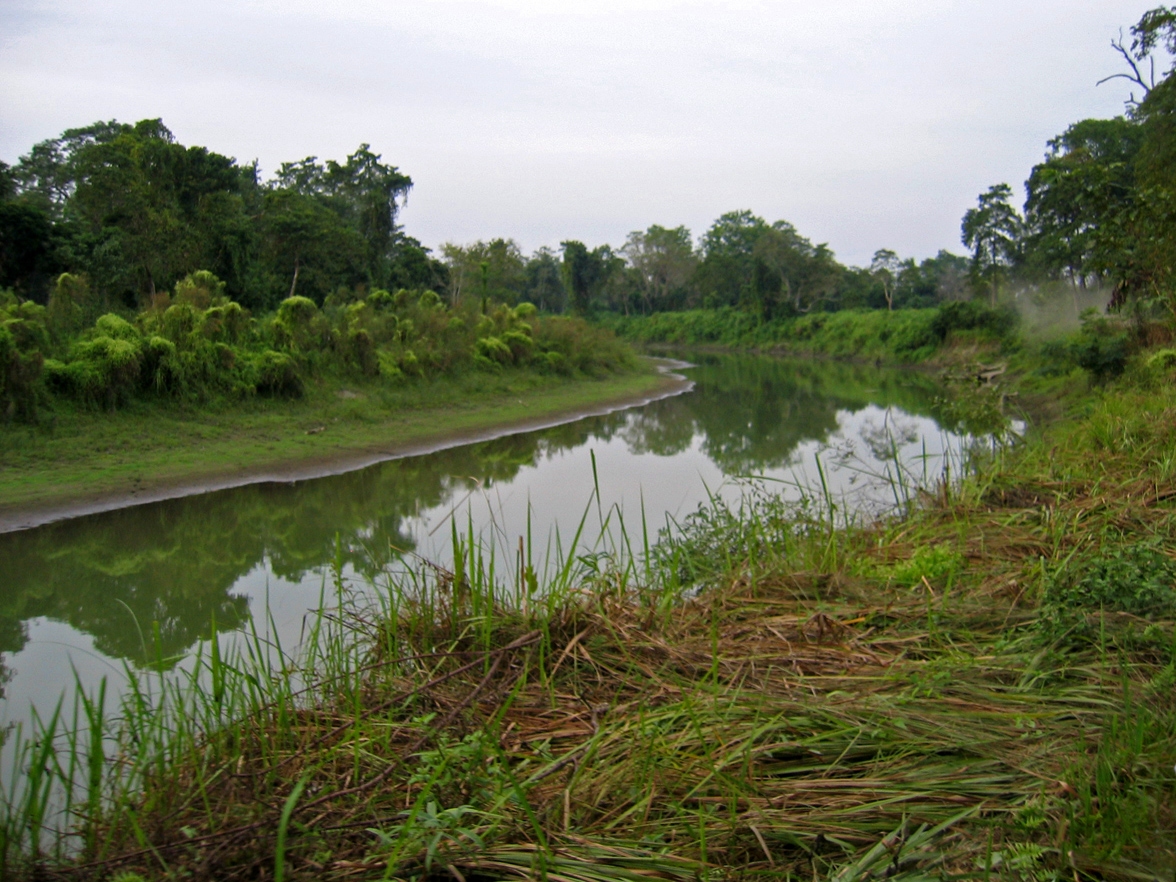
Grasslands and deciduous forests of Kaziranga

Four main types of vegetation exist in this park. These are alluvial inundated grasslands, alluvial savanna woodlands, tropical moist mixed deciduous forests, and tropical semi-evergreen forests. Based on Landsat data for 1986, percent coverage by vegetation is: tall grasses 41%, short grasses 11%, open jungle 29%, swamps 4%, rivers and water bodies 8%, and sand 6%.

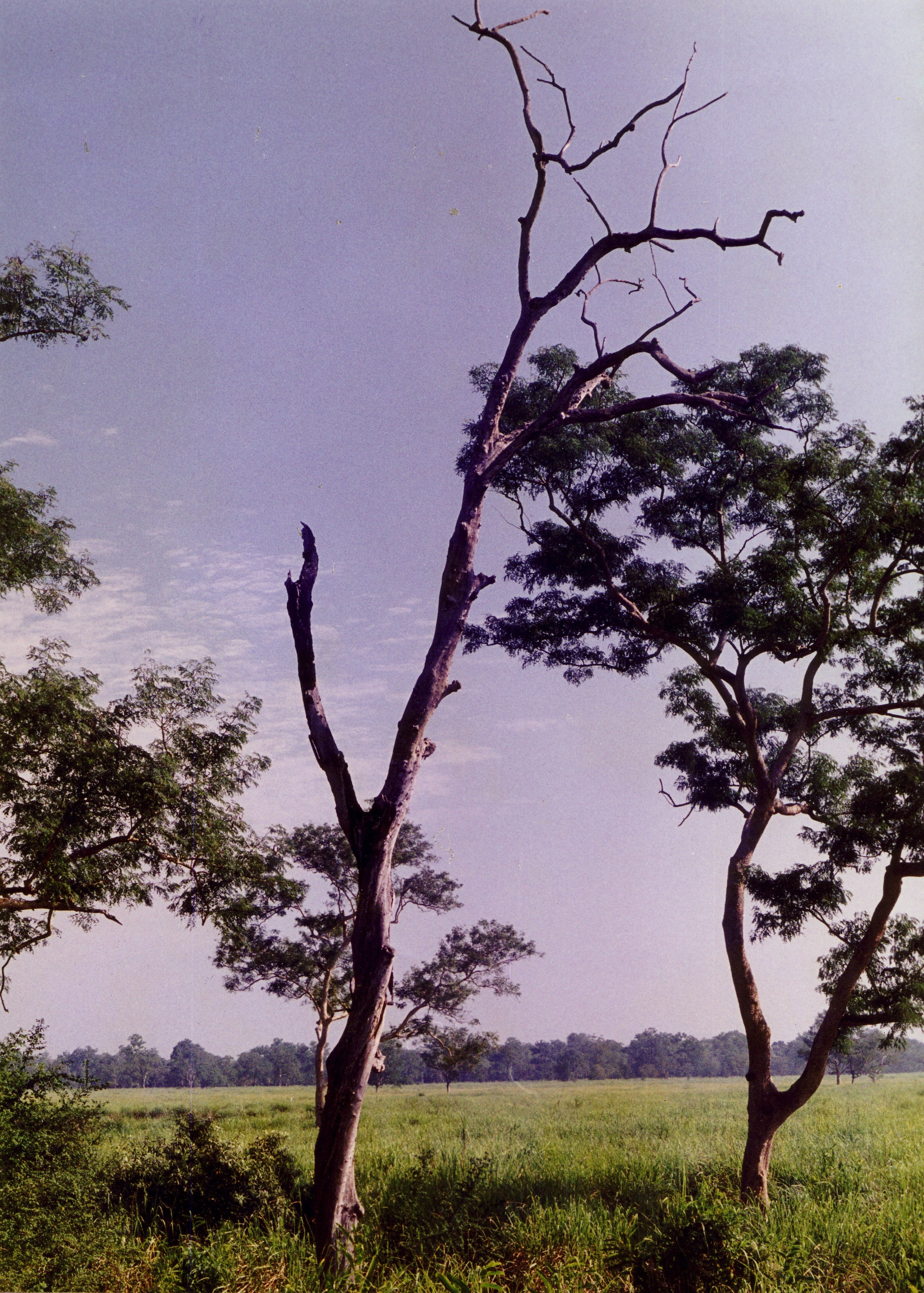
View of a leafless tree viewed from a watchtower in Kaziranga National Park with the backdrop of the grasslands and the forest in the distance

Thick evergreen forests, near the Kanchanjhuri, Panbari, and Tamulipathar blocks, contain trees such as Aphanamixis polystachya, Talauma hodgsonii, Dillenia indica, Garcinia tinctoria, Ficus rumphii, Cinnamomum bejolghota, and species of Syzygium. Tropical semi-evergreen forests are present near Baguri, Bimali, and Haldibari. Common trees and shrubs are Albizia procera, Duabanga grandiflora, Lagerstroemia speciosa, Crateva unilocularis, Sterculia urens, Grewia serrulata, Mallotus philippensis, Bridelia retusa, Aphania rubra, Leea indica, and Leea umbraculifera.

There are many different aquatic floras in the lakes and ponds, and along the river shores. The invasive water hyacinth is very common, often choking the water bodies, but it is cleared during destructive floods. Another invasive species, Mimosa invisa, which is toxic to herbivores, was cleared by Kaziranga staff with help from the Wildlife Trust of India in 2005.

== Fauna ==
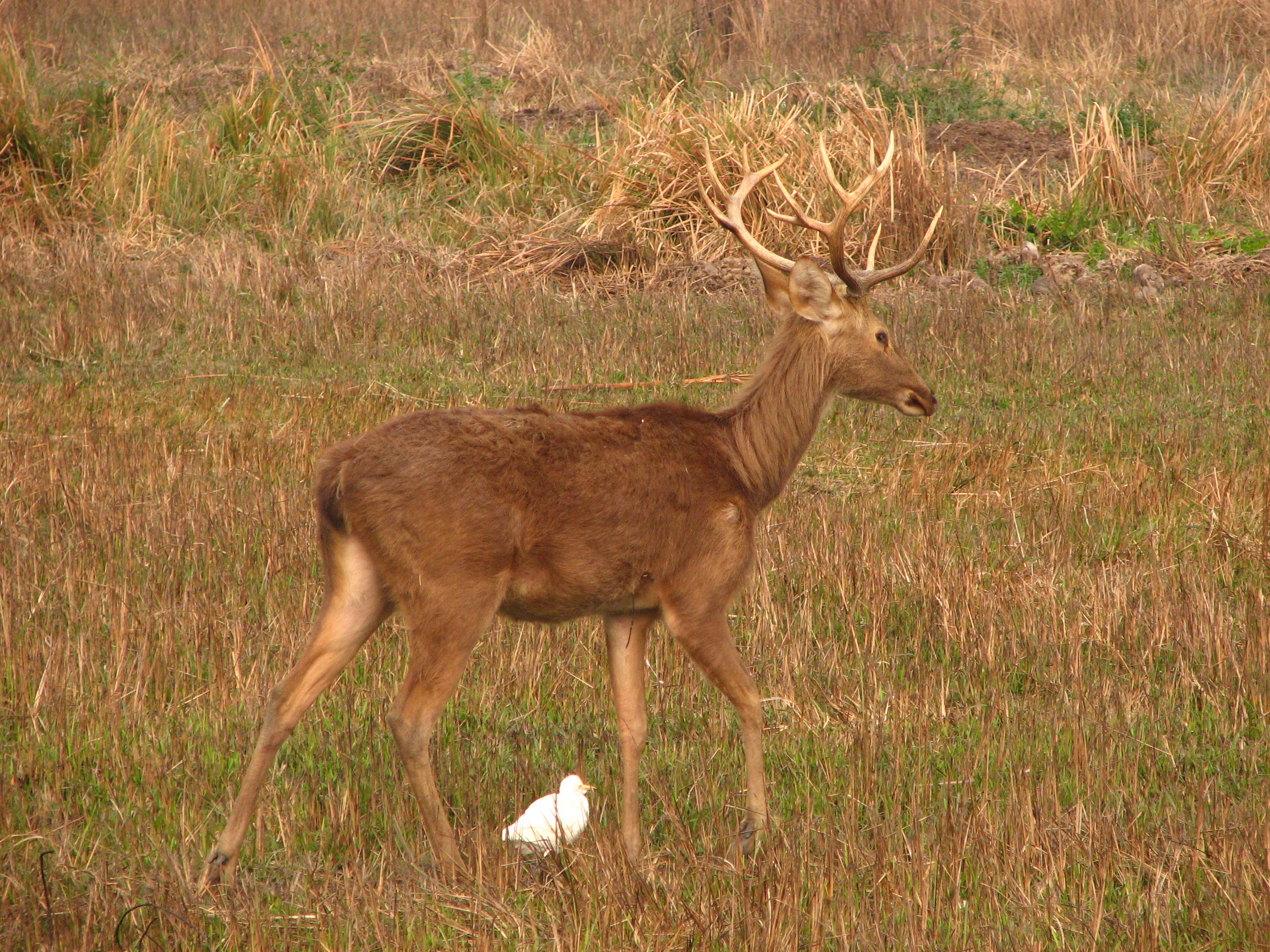
Swamp deer stag

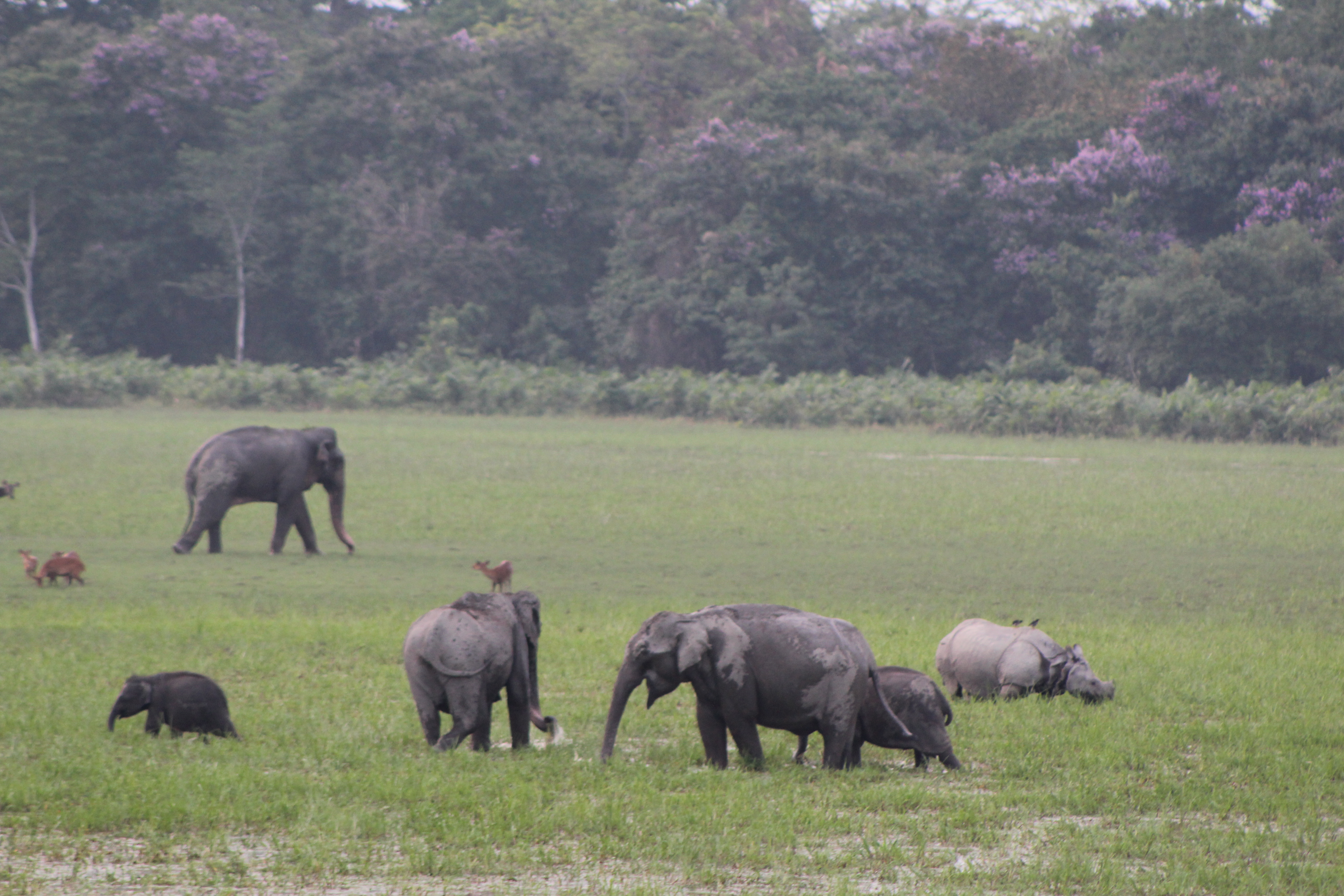
Indian rhinoceroses and Indian elephant grazing in Kaziranga National Park

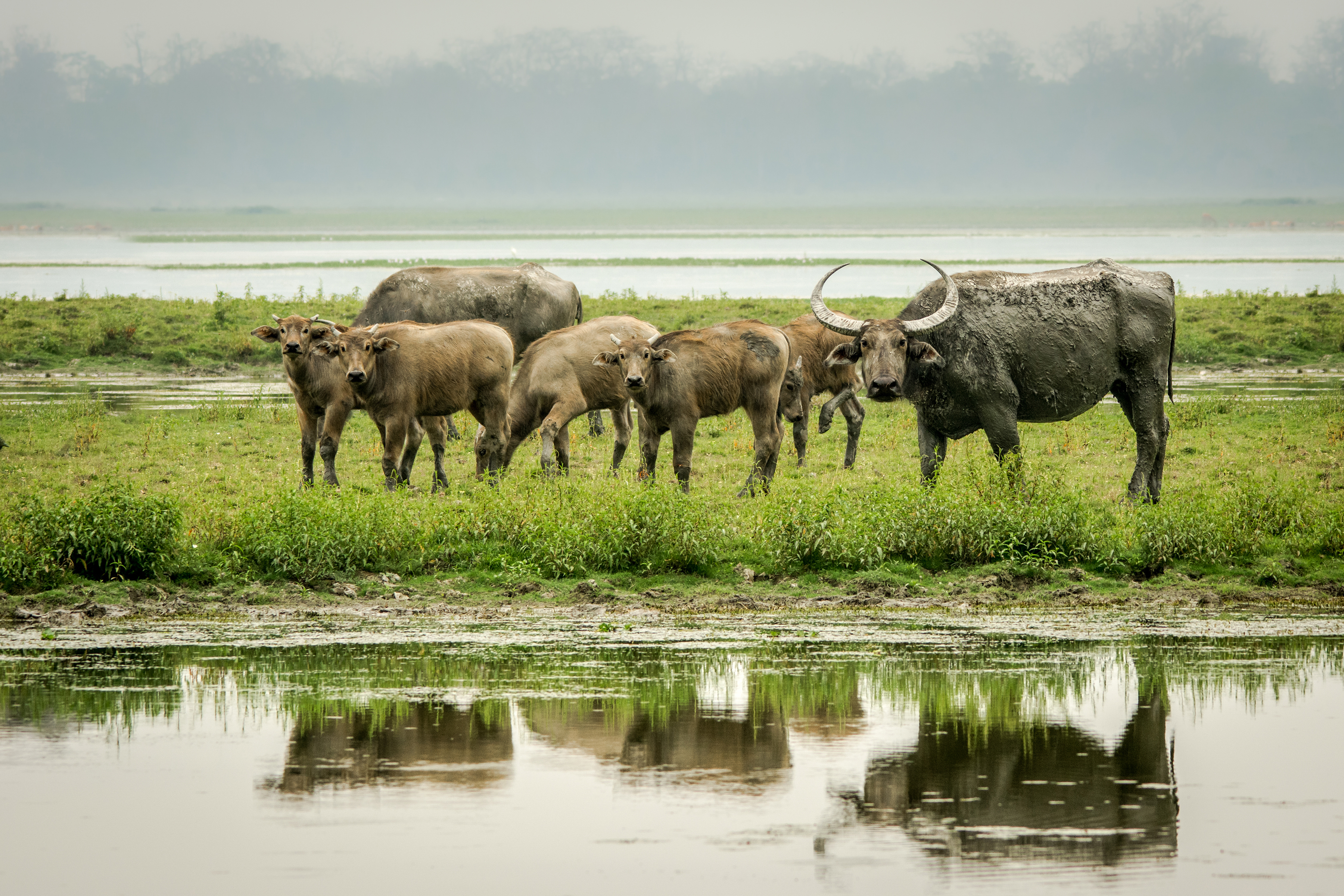
Wild water buffalo herd

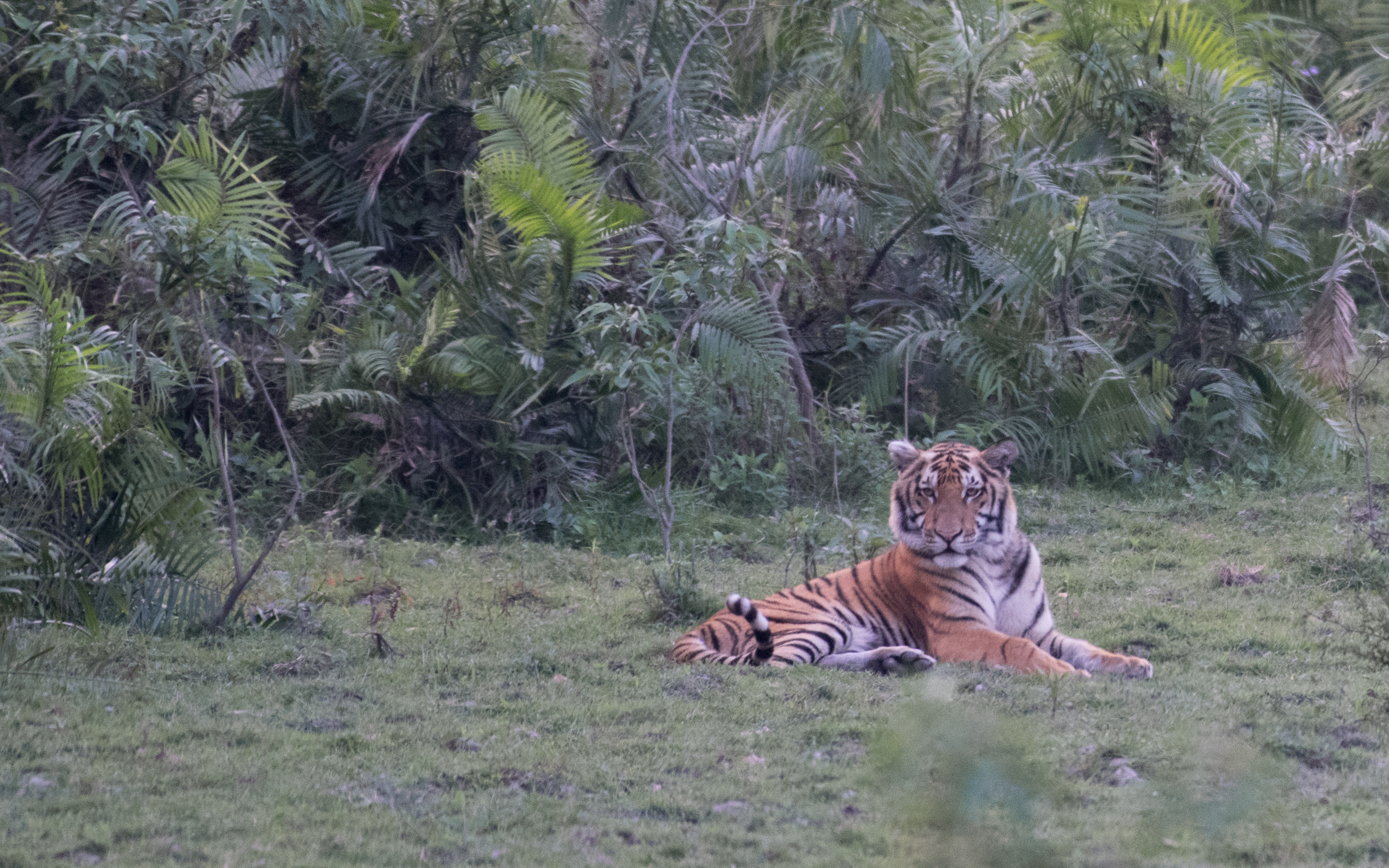
Bengal tiger

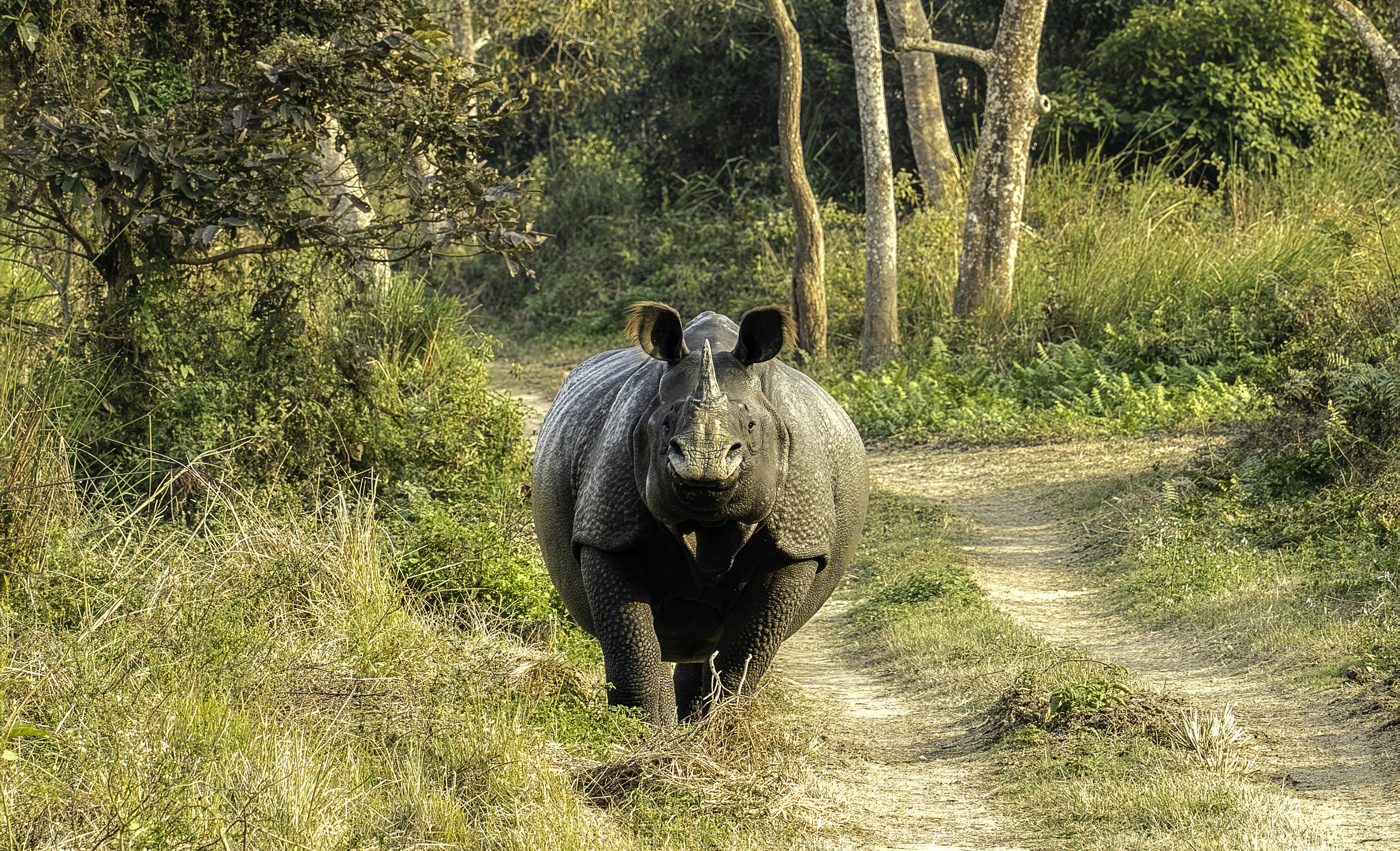
Indian rhinoceros (Rhinoceros unicornis)

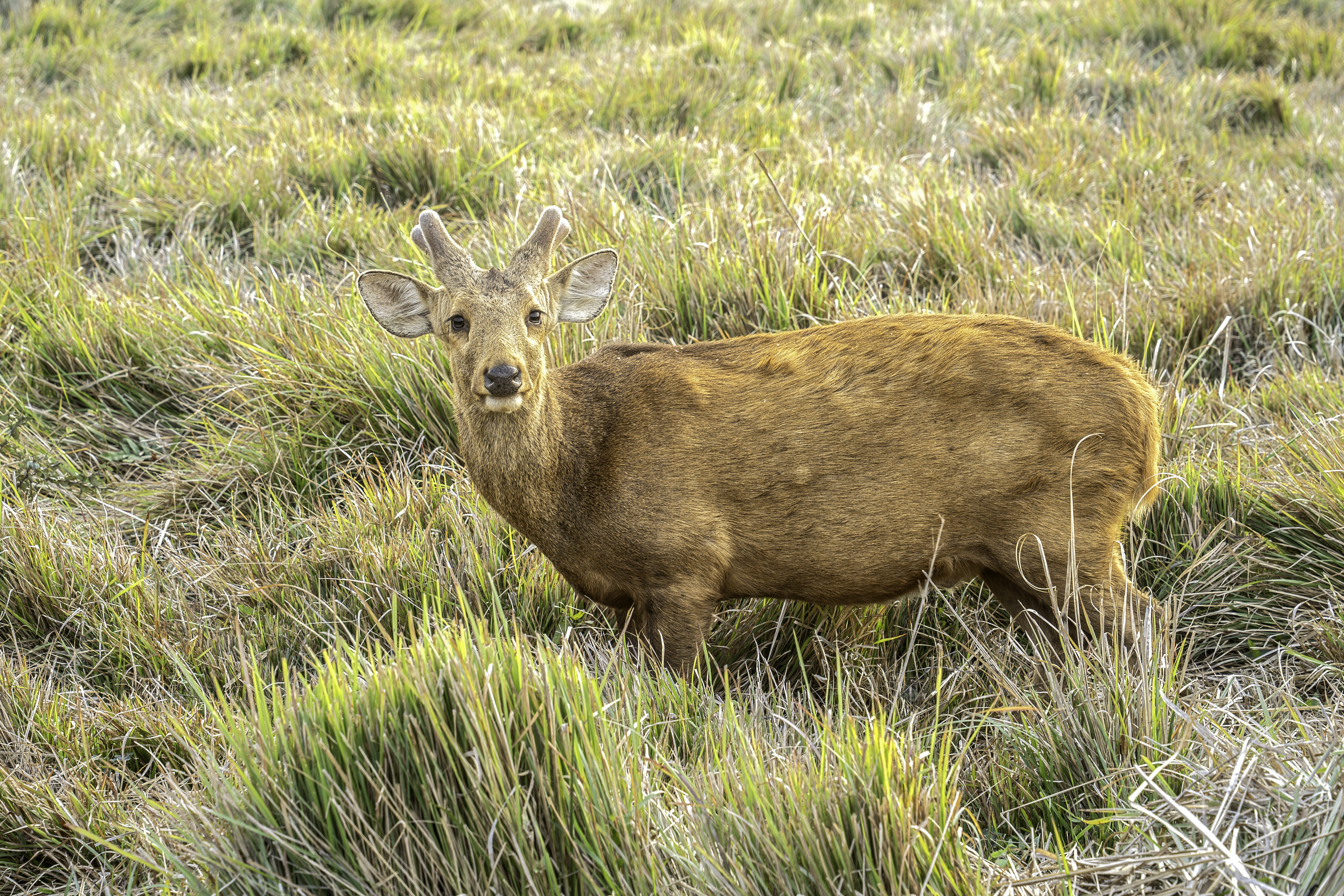
A hog deer (Axis porcinus)

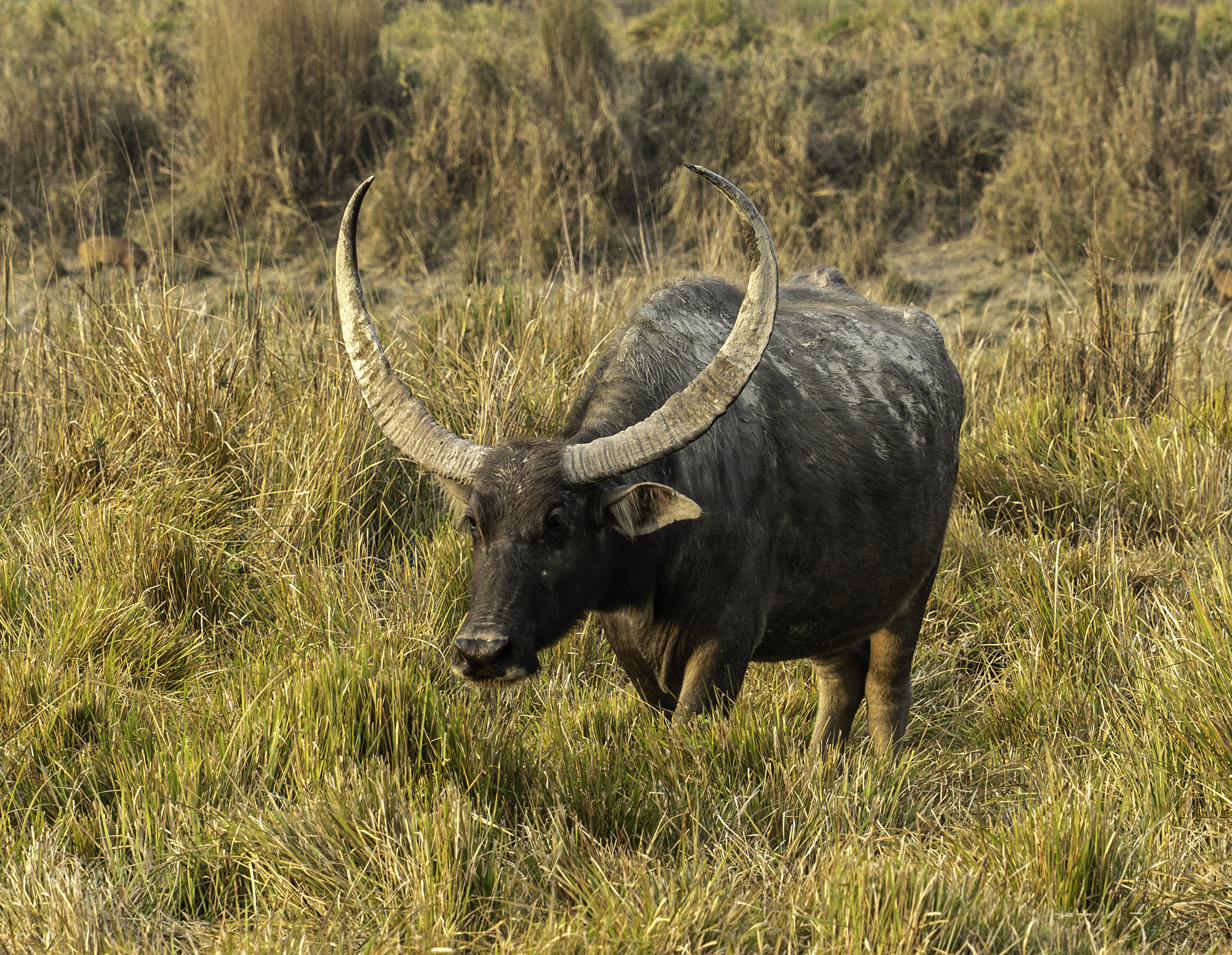
A wild water buffalo (Bubalus arnee)

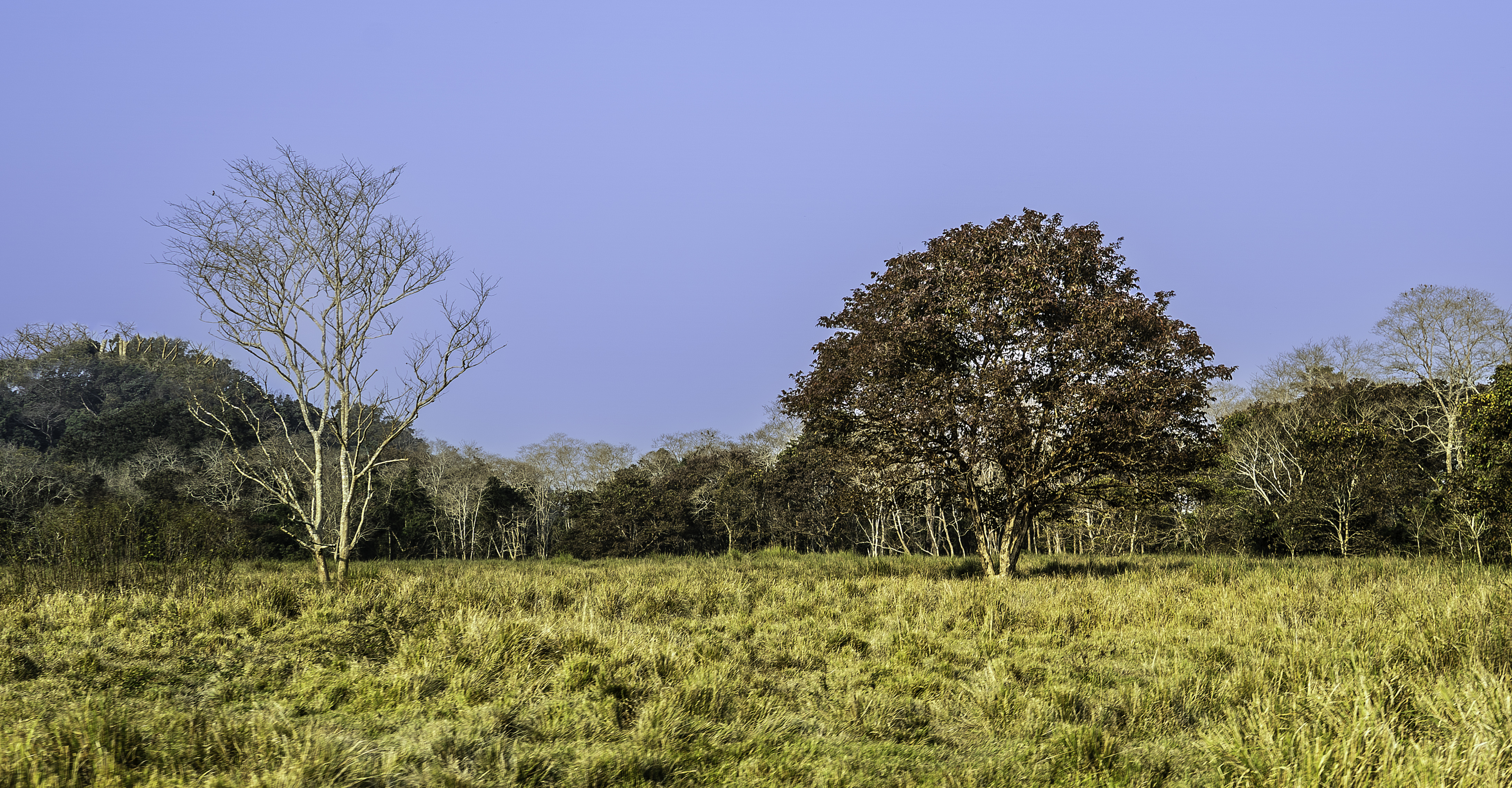
Nature at Kaziranga

Kaziranga contains significant breeding populations of 35 mammalian species, The park has the distinction of being home to the world's largest population of the Indian rhinoceros (2,401), wild water buffalo (1,666) and eastern swamp deer (468). Significant populations of large herbivores include Indian elephants (1,940), sambar (58). Small herbivores include the Indian muntjac, Indian boar and Indian hog deer. Kaziranga has the largest population of the Wild water buffalo anywhere accounting for about 57% of the world population. The Indian rhinoceros, royal Bengal tiger, Asian elephant, wild water buffalo and swamp deer are collectively known as 'Big Five' of Kaziranga.

Kaziranga is one of the few wild breeding areas outside Africa for multiple species of large cats, such as Bengal tigers and Indian leopard. Kaziranga was declared a Tiger Reserve in 2007 . Other felids include the jungle cat, fishing cat and leopard cat. It is also the only place in India and the world, where a Golden tiger was spotted in the wild.

Small mammals include the rare hispid hare, Indian gray mongoose, small Indian mongooses, large Indian civet, small Indian civets, Bengal fox, golden jackal, sloth bear, Chinese pangolin, Indian pangolins, hog badger, Chinese ferret-badger, and particoloured flying squirrel. Nine of the 14 primate species found in India occur in the park. Prominent among them are the Assamese macaque, capped and golden langur, as well as the only ape found in India, the hoolock gibbon. The binturong and the Asian small-clawed otter were recorded in the park in the year 2024.

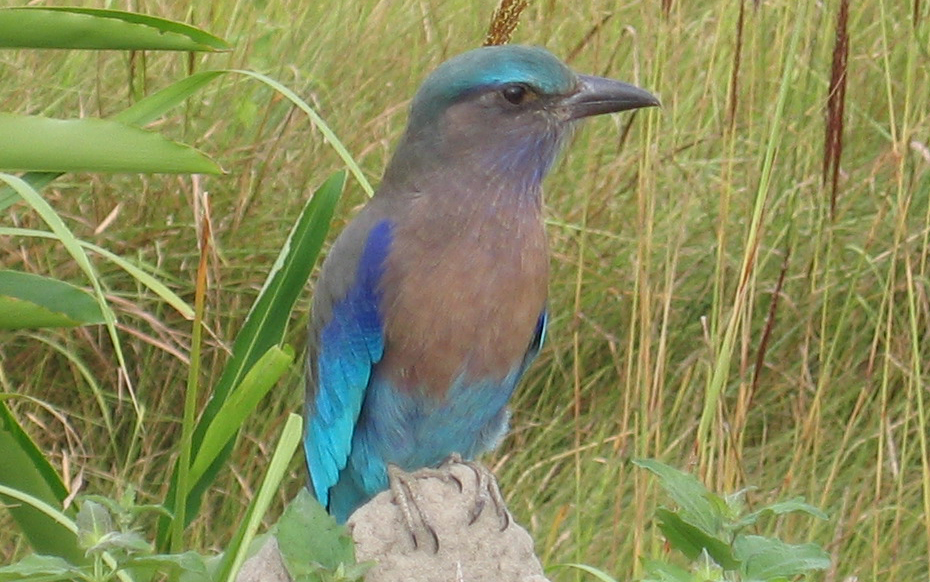
An Indian roller at Kaziranga

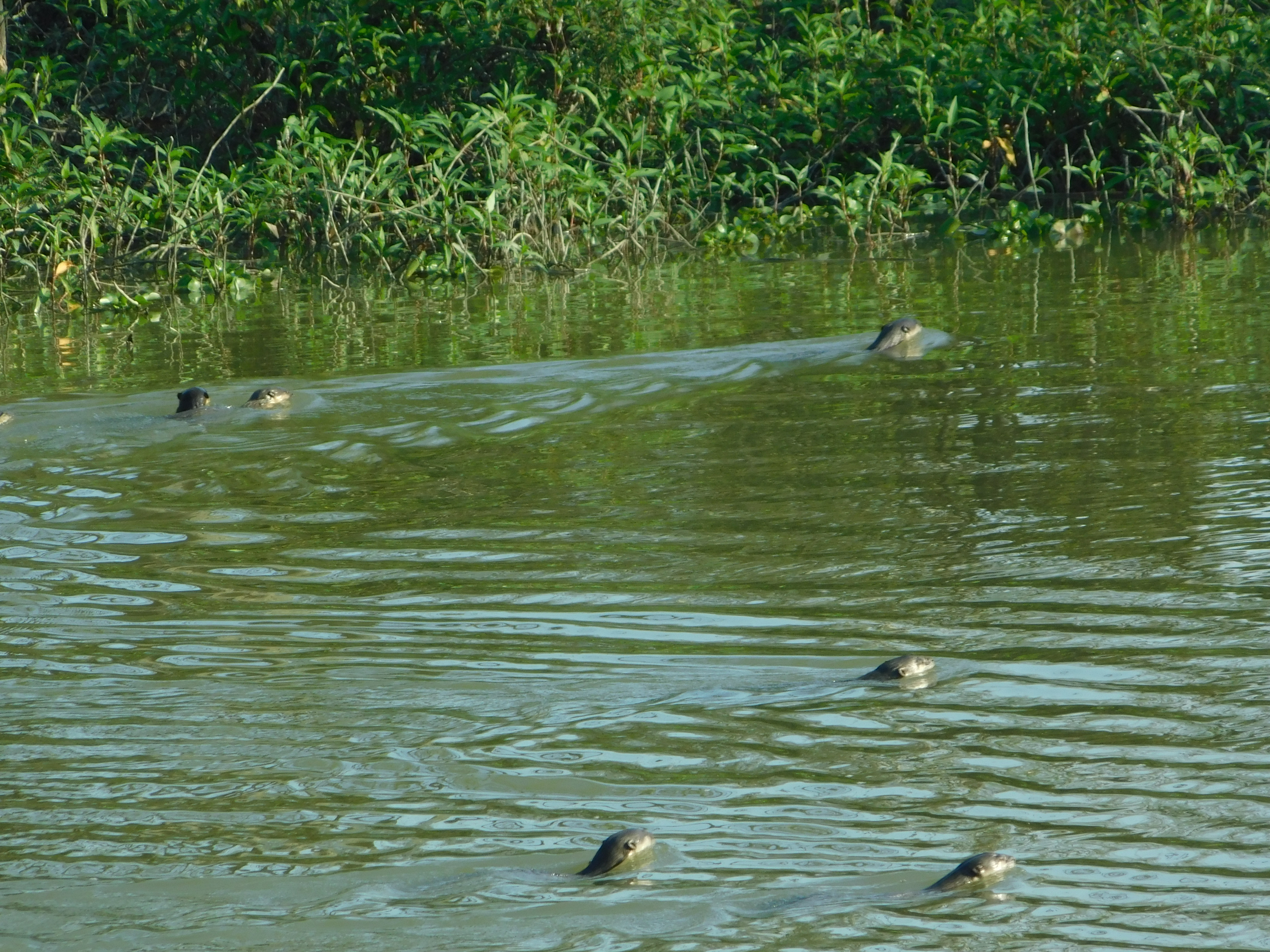
Otters in Kaziranga National Park

Kaziranga has been identified by Birdlife International as an Important Bird Area. It is home to a variety of migratory birds, water birds, predators, scavengers, and game birds. Birds such as the lesser white-fronted goose, ferruginous duck, Baer's pochard duck and lesser adjutant, greater adjutant, black-necked stork, and Asian openbill stork migrate from Central Asia to the park during winter. Riverine birds include the Blyth's kingfisher, white-bellied heron, Dalmatian pelican, spot-billed pelican, Nordmann's greenshank, and black-bellied tern. Birds of prey include the rare eastern imperial, greater spotted eagle, white-tailed eagle, Pallas's fish eagle, grey-headed fish eagle and the lesser kestrel.

Kaziranga was once home to seven species of vultures, but the vulture population reached near extinction, supposedly by feeding on animal carcasses containing the drug Diclofenac. Only the Indian vulture, slender-billed vulture, and white-rumped vulture have survived. Game birds include the swamp francolin, Bengal florican, and pale-capped pigeon.

Other families of birds inhabiting Kaziranga include the great pied hornbill and wreathed hornbill, Old World babblers such as Jerdon's and marsh babblers, weaver birds such as the common baya weaver, threatened Finn's weavers, and bristled grassbird. Other threatened species include the black-breasted parrotbill

Two of the largest snakes in the world, the reticulated python and Indian rock python, as well as the longest venomous snake in the world, the king cobra, inhabit the park. Other snakes found here include the Indian cobra, monocled cobra, Russell's viper, and the common krait. Monitor lizard species found in the park include the Bengal monitor and the Asian water monitor. Other reptiles include fifteen species of turtle, such as the endemic Assam roofed turtle and one species of tortoise, the brown tortoise. 42 species of fish are found in the area, including the Tetraodon.

== Governance ==
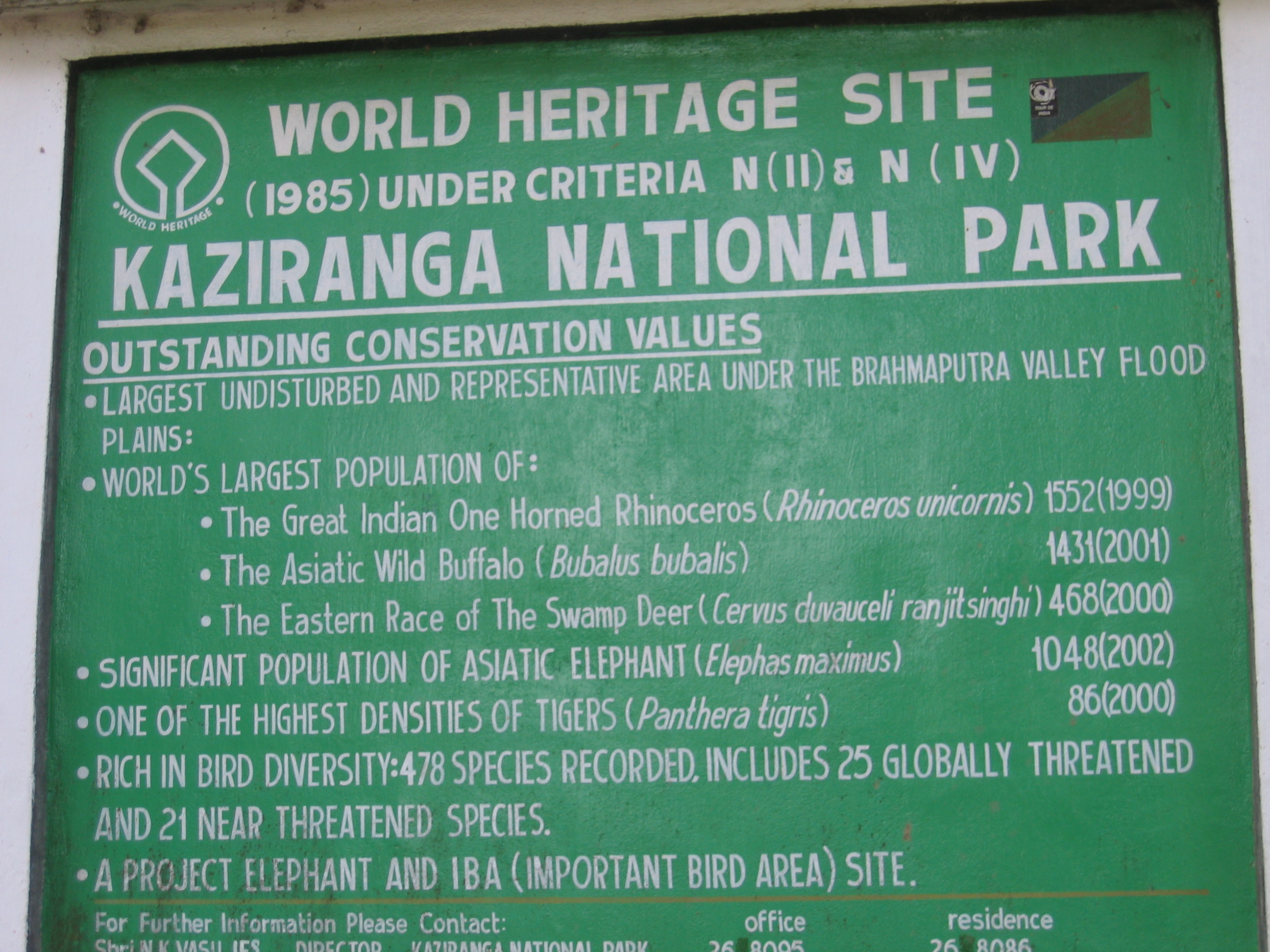
A board proclaiming the biological heritage of the park

The Wildlife wing of the forest department of the Government of Assam, headquartered at Bokakhat, is responsible for the administration and management of Kaziranga. The administrative head of the park is the director, who is a Chief Conservator of Forests-level officer. A divisional Forest Officer is the administrative chief executive of the park. He is assisted by two officers with the rank of Assistant Conservator of Forests. The park area is divided into five ranges, overseen by Range Forest Officers. The five ranges are the Burapahar (HQ: Ghorakati), Western (HQ: Baguri), Central (HQ: Kohora), Eastern (HQ: Agaratoli) and Northern (HQ: Biswanath). Each range is further sub-divided into beats, headed by a forester, and sub-beats, headed by a forest guard.

The park receives financial aid from the State Government as well as the Ministry of Environment, Forests & Climate Change of Government of India under various Plan and Non-Plan Budgets. Additional funding is received under the Project Elephant from the Central Government. Most of this funding is used in paying wages and salaries of the staff and in anti-poaching measures, only a little sum is left behind for the development of the park. In spite of the funding from the government the park faces shortage of funds. In 1997–1998, a grant of US$ 100,000 was received under the Technical Co-operation for Security Reinforcement scheme from the World Heritage Fund.

Local people are employed from the park in the form of labour and anti-poaching activities, construction of bridges and culverts. Approximately 100 to 200 people are hired per range for removal of mimosa, which is harmful for the herbivores. As of 2007, the park authorities have also hired security guards to protect tourist jeeps inside the park. The park has developed a network of intelligence throughout the villages surrounding the park. There are key informants in every village, which reports about the movement of poachers and are monetarily compensated for information they provide to the park authorities.

=== Conservation management ===
Kaziranga National Park has been granted maximum protection under the Indian law for wildlife conservation. Various laws, which range in dates from the Assam Forest Regulation of 1891 and the Biodiversity Conservation Act of 2002 have been enacted for protection of wildlife in the park. Poaching activities, particularly of the rhinoceroses for its horn, has been a major concern for the authorities. Between 1980 and 2005, 567 rhinoceroses were hunted by poachers. Following a decreasing trend for the past few years, 18 Indian rhinoceroses were killed by poachers in 2007. Reports have suggested that there are links between these poaching activities and funding of terrorist organizations.

Preventive measures such as construction of anti-poaching camps and maintenance of existing ones, patrolling, intelligence gathering, and control over the use of firearms around the park have reduced the number of casualties. Since 2013, the park used cameras on drones which are monitored by security guards to protect the rhino from armed poachers.

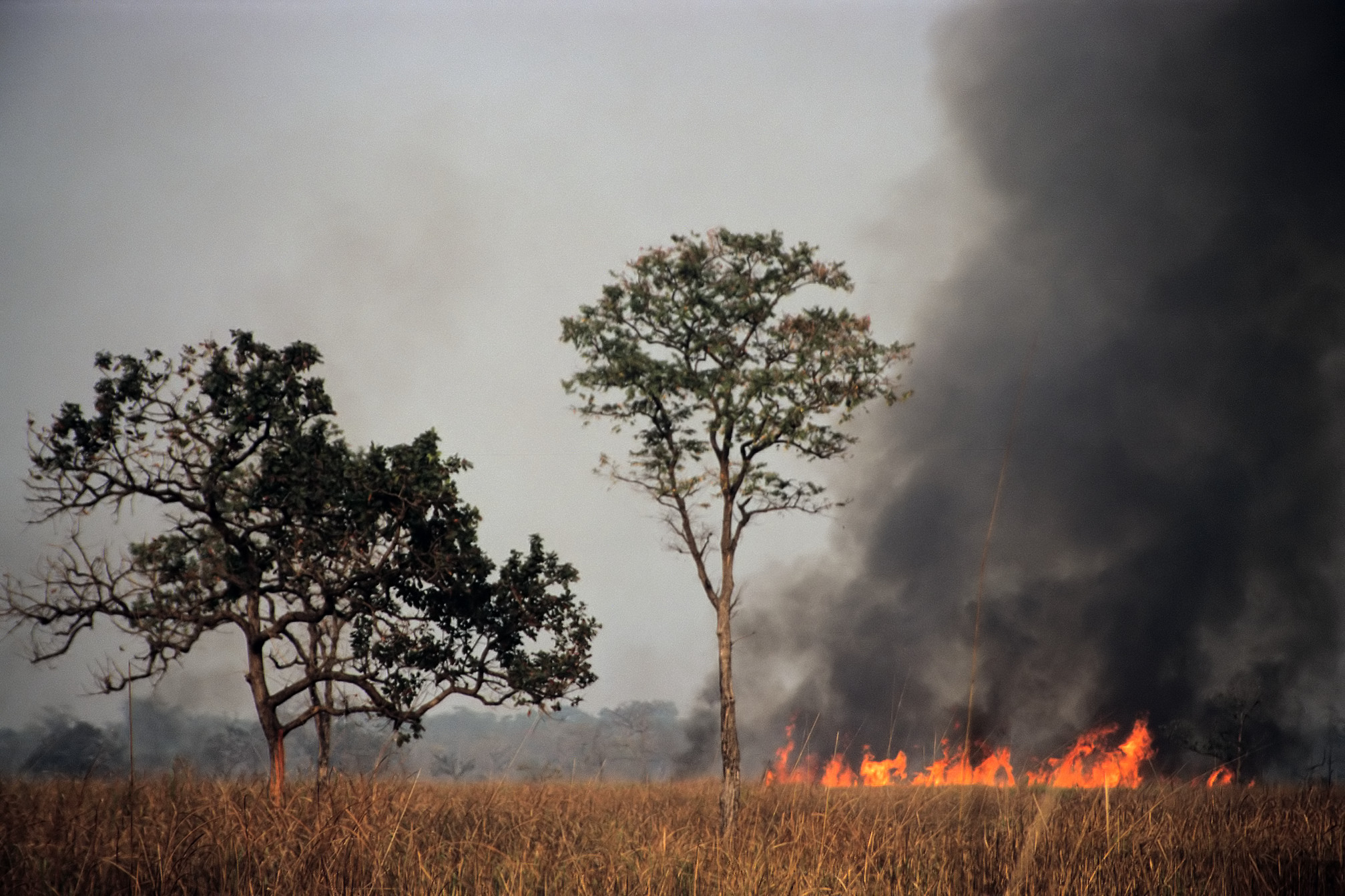
Controlled burning of grass in Kaziranga

Perennial flooding and heavy rains have resulted in the death of wild animals and damage to the conservation infrastructures. Several corridors have been set up for the safe passage of animals across National Highway–37 which skirts around the southern boundary of the park.

Water pollution due to run-off from pesticides from tea gardens, and run-off from a petroleum refinery at Numaligarh, pose a hazard to the ecology of the region. Grassland management techniques, such as controlled burning, are effected annually to avoid forest fires.

View source data.

== Ecotourism ==
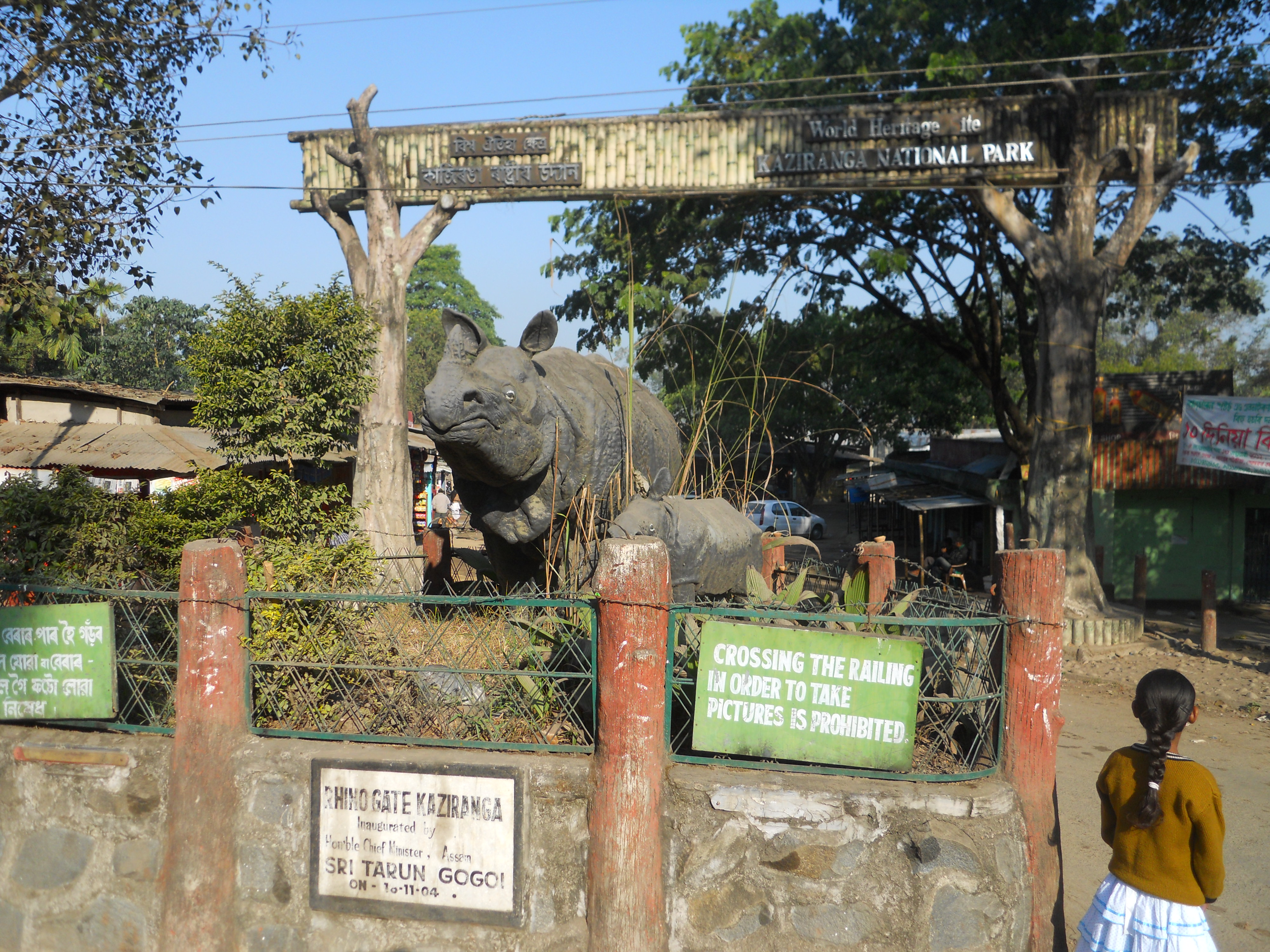
Entrance gate of Kaziranga National Park

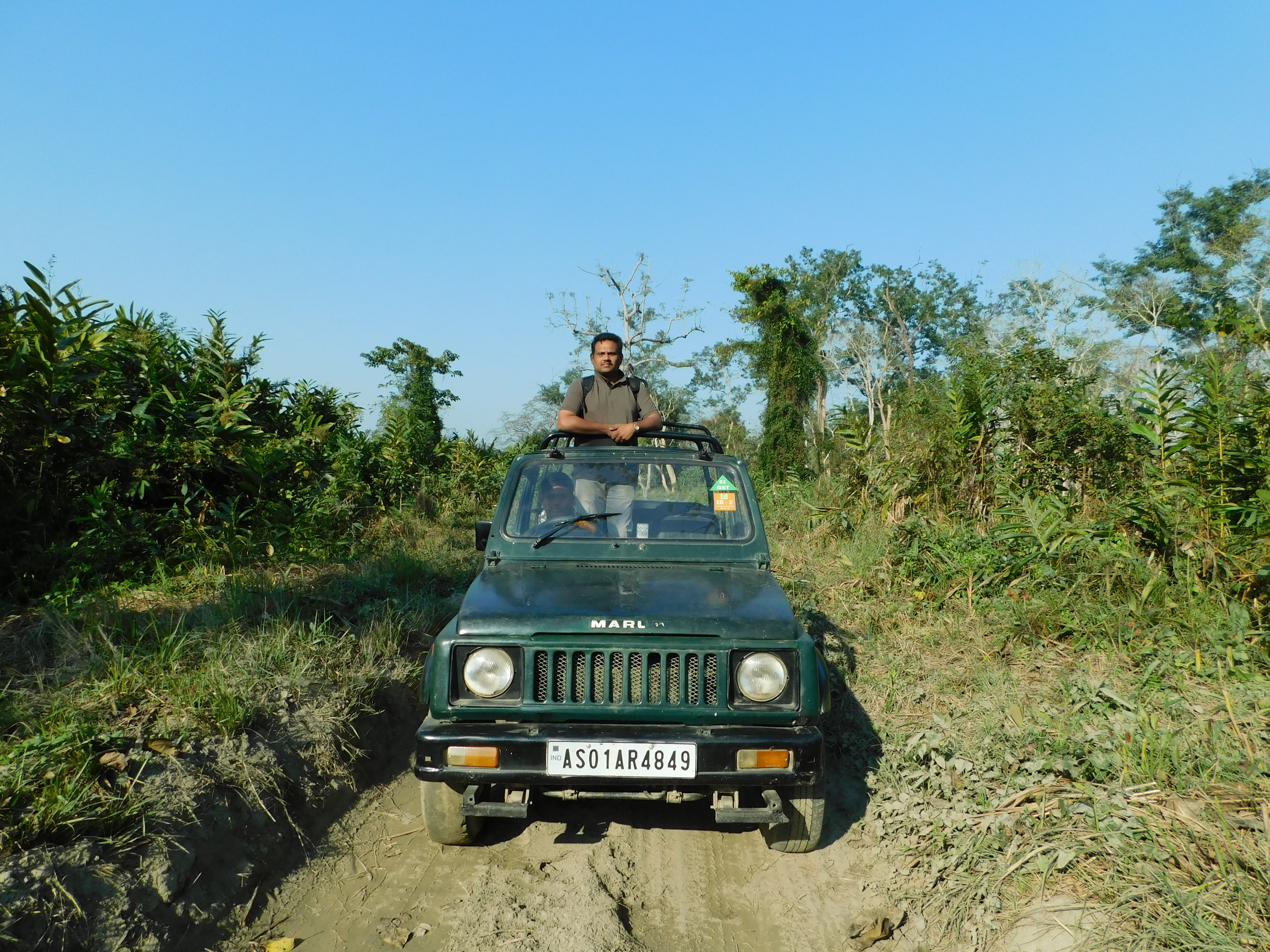
Visitors are allowed in open vehicles in Kaziranga National Park

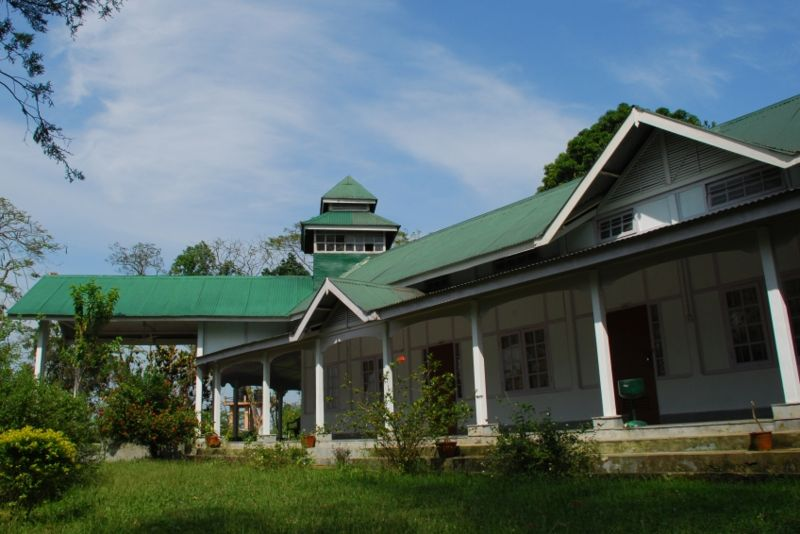
Bonoshree Tourist Lodge in Kaziranga, maintained by the Government of Assam

Observing the wildlife, including birding, is the main visitor activity in and around the park. Guided tours by elephant or Jeep are available. Hiking is prohibited in the park to avoid potential human-animal conflicts. Observation towers are situated at Sohola, Mihimukh, Kathpara, Foliamari, and Harmoti for wildlife viewing. The snow-covered Lower Himalayan peaks frame the park's landscape of trees and grass interspersed with numerous ponds. An interpretation centre is at the Bagori range of Kaziranga to help visitors learn more about the park. Increase in tourist inflow has led to the economic empowerment of the people living at the fringes of the park, by means of tourism related activities, encouraging a recognition of the value of its protection. A survey of tourists notes that 80 percent found rhino sightings most enjoyable and that foreign tourists were more likely to support park protection and employment opportunities financially, while local tourists favored support for veterinary services. Recently set up Kaziranga National Orchid and Biodiversity Park established at Durgapur village is a latest attraction to the tourists. It houses more than 500 species of orchids, 132 varieties of sour fruits and leafy vegetables, 12 species of cane, 46 species of bamboo and a large varieties of local fishes.

Tourism benefits the people living in the fringe of the park and helps in empowering the local people. As of 2007, about 35 hotels or lodges of various kinds located just outside the park, four of which run by the government. They employ about 300 people. Some families also offer home stay facilities just outside the park so that the tourists may get a taste of the local life and host can drive and guide visitors into the park. There are also 26 shops selling souvenirs and locally handmade woven cloth that are owned and/or managed by local community members. The Ministry of Tourism, Government of India and the United Nations Development Programme (UNDP) jointly support rural tourism in village of Durgapur, which falls in the periphery of the Kohora range of Kaziranga along with other initiatives at 31 sites across India.

== Controversy ==
In 2017, Kaziranga came under severe criticism after a BBC News documentary revealed a hardliner strategy to conservation, reporting the killing of 20 people a year in the name of rhino conservation. As a consequence of this reporting, BBC News was banned from filming in protected areas in India for 5 years. While several news reports claimed that BBC had apologized for the documentary, the BBC stood by its report, with its director general, Tony Hall, writing in a letter to Survival International that "the letter 'in no way constitutes an apology for our journalism.'" As a response to the report, researchers in India have provided more nuanced understanding of the matter, calling out BBC for the carelessness of its journalism, but also pointing to the problems of conservation in Kaziranga and questioning whether shoot-at-sight has been a useful conservation strategy at all.

== Economic valuation ==
Kaziranga Tiger Reserve estimated its annual flow benefits to be 9.8 billion rupees (0.95 lakh / hectare). Important ecosystem services included habitat and refugia for wildlife (5.73 billion), gene-pool protection (3.49 billion), recreation value (21 million), biological control (150 million) and sequestration of carbon (17 million).

== In popular culture ==
Kaziranga has been the theme of, or has been mentioned in, several books, songs, and documentaries. The park first gained international prominence after Robin Banerjee, a physician-turned-photographer and filmmaker, produced a documentary titled Kaziranga, which was aired on television in Berlin in 1961 and became a runaway success.

Kaziranga Trail, a children's storybook by Arup Dutta about rhinoceros poaching in the national park, won the Shankar's Award. The Assamese singer Bhupen Hazarika refers to Kaziranga in one of his songs. The BBC conservationist and travel writer, Mark Shand, authored a book and the corresponding BBC documentary Queen of the Elephants, based on the life of the first female mahout in recent times—Parbati Barua of Kaziranga. The book went on to win the 1996 Thomas Cook Travel Book Award and the Prix Litteraire d'Amis, providing publicity simultaneously to the profession of mahouts as well as to Kaziranga.

== See also ==
- Biodiversity of Assam
- Climate of Kaziranga National Park
- Jaws of Death, a documentary
- Kaziranga Elephant Festival
- List of national parks of India
- Manas National Park
- Rhino poaching in Assam
- Tourism in North East India

== Further information ==
- Barthakur, Ranjit; Sahgal, Bittu (2005). The Kaziranga Inheritance. Mumbai: Sanctuary Asia.
- Sandesh, Kadur; Thengummoottil, George (2014). Kaziranga National Park. ASSAM: UNESCO.
- Choudhury, Anwaruddin (2000). The Birds of Assam. Guwahati: Gibbon Books and World Wide Fund for Nature.
- Choudhury, Anwaruddin (2003). Birds of Kaziranga National Park: A checklist. Guwahati: Gibbon Books and The Rhino Foundation for Nature in NE India.
- Choudhury, Anwaruddin (2004). Kaziranga Wildlife in Assam. India: Rupa & Co.
- Choudhury, Anwaruddin (2010). The vanishing herds : the wild water buffalo. Guwahati, India: Gibbon Books, Rhino Foundation, CEPF & COA, Taiwan.
- Dutta, Arup Kumar (1991). Unicornis: The Great Indian One Horned Rhinoceros. New Delhi: Konark Publication.
- Gee, E.P. (1964). The Wild Life of India. London: Collins.
- Jaws of Death—a 2005 documentary by Gautam Saikia about Kaziranga animals being hit by vehicular traffic while crossing National Highway 37, winner of the Vatavaran Award.
- Oberai, C.P.; B.S. Bonal (2002). Kaziranga: The Rhino Land. New Delhi: B.R. Publishing.
- Shrivastava, Rahul; Heinen, Joel (2007). "A microsite analysis of resource use around Kaziranga National Park, India: Implications for conservation and development planning". The Journal of Environment & Development. 16 (2): 207–226. doi:10.1177/1070496507301064. S2CID 54535379.
- Shrivastava, Rahul; Heinen, Joel (2005). "Migration and Home Gardens in the Brahmaputra Valley, Assam, India". Journal of Ecological Anthropology. 9: 20–34. doi:10.5038/2162-4593.9.1.2.
