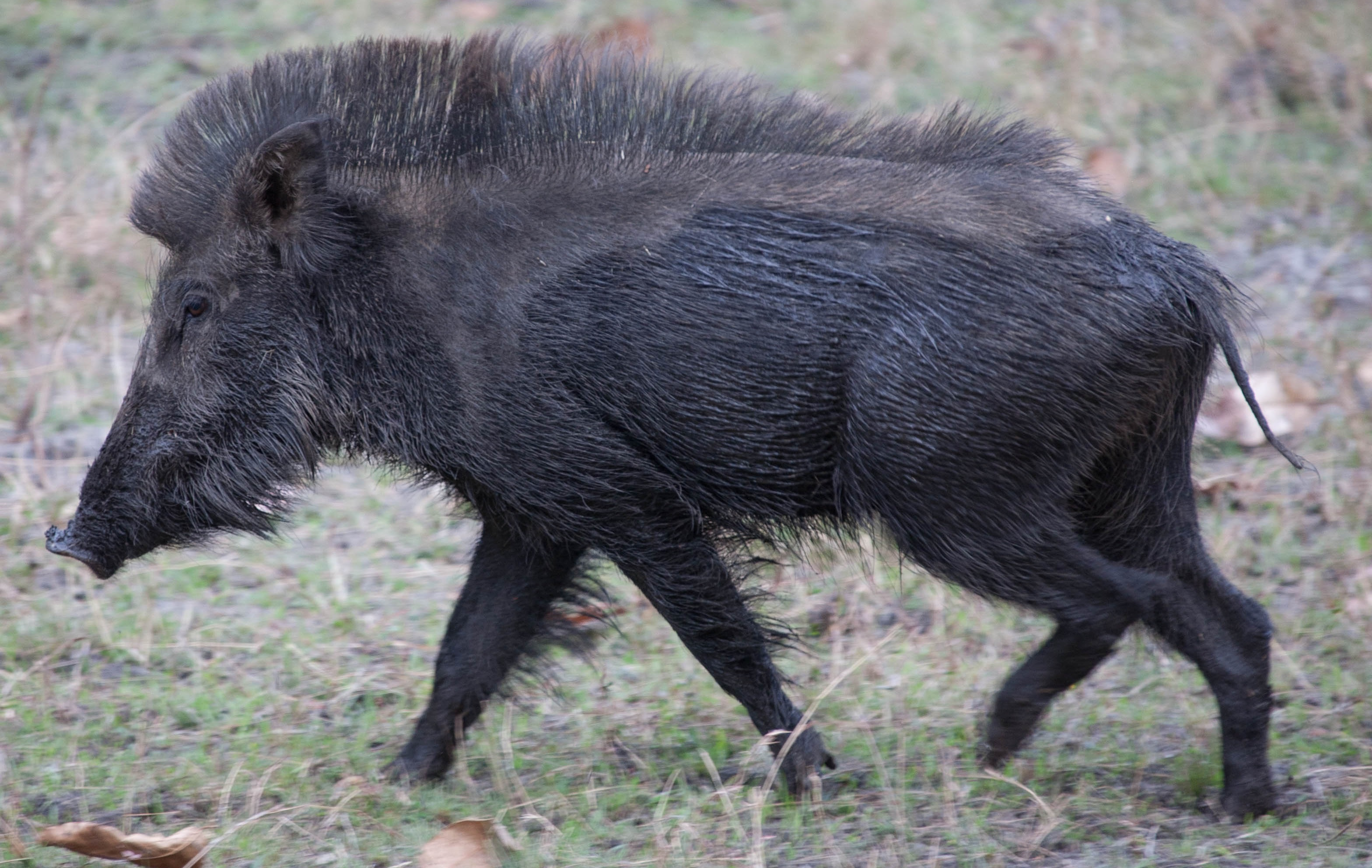
- Indian boar, Bandhavgarh National Park, India

Scientific classification
- Kingdom: Animalia
- Phylum: Chordata
- Class: Mammalia
- Order: Artiodactyla
- Family: Suidae
- Genus: Sus
- Species: S. scrofa
- Subspecies: S. s. cristatus

Trinomial name
- Sus scrofa cristatus Wagner, 1839

Synonyms
- Species synonymy: affinis (Gray, 1847); aipomus (Gray, 1868); aipomus (Hodgson, 1842); bengalensis (Blyth, 1860); indicus (Gray, 1843); isonotus (Gray, 1868); isonotus (Hodgson, 1842); jubatus (Miller, 1906); typicus (Lydekker, 1900); zeylonensis (Blyth, 1851)

= Indian boar =

Subspecies of wild boar

The Indian boar (Sus scrofa cristatus), also known as the Moupin pig, is a subspecies of wild boar native to India, Pakistan, Nepal, Myanmar, western Thailand, Bangladesh and Sri Lanka.

== Description ==
The Indian boar differs from the Central European Boar by its large mane which runs in a crest along its back from its head to lower body, larger, more sharply featured and straighter skull, its smaller, sharper ears and overall lighter build. It is slightly taller and more sparsely haired than the European form, though its back bristles are much more developed. The tail is also more tufted, and the cheeks hairier. Adults measure from 84 to 91 cm (33 to 36 in) in shoulder height (with one specimen in West Bengal having reached 97 cm (38 in)) and 152 cm (5 ft) in body length. Weight ranges from 91 to 136 kg (200 to 300 lb).

== In culture ==
The animal has interacted with humans in the Indian Subcontinent since the Upper Paleolithic, with the oldest depiction being a cave painting in Bhimbetaka rock shelters, and it occasionally appears in Hindu mythology. A story present in the Brahmanas says that Indra killed an evil boar, who has stolen the treasure of the asuras, then giving its carcass to Vishnu, who offers it as a sacrifice to the gods and goddesses and they eat it. In a story in the Charaka Samhita, a boar named Ermusha is an avatara of Brahma and he raises the earth and sky from the primeval waters of the universe during creation and creates the universe. In the Ramayana, Mahabharata and the Puranas, another boar, Varaha is an avatar of Vishnu that kills Hiranyaksha and saves Bhumi.

== Gallery ==
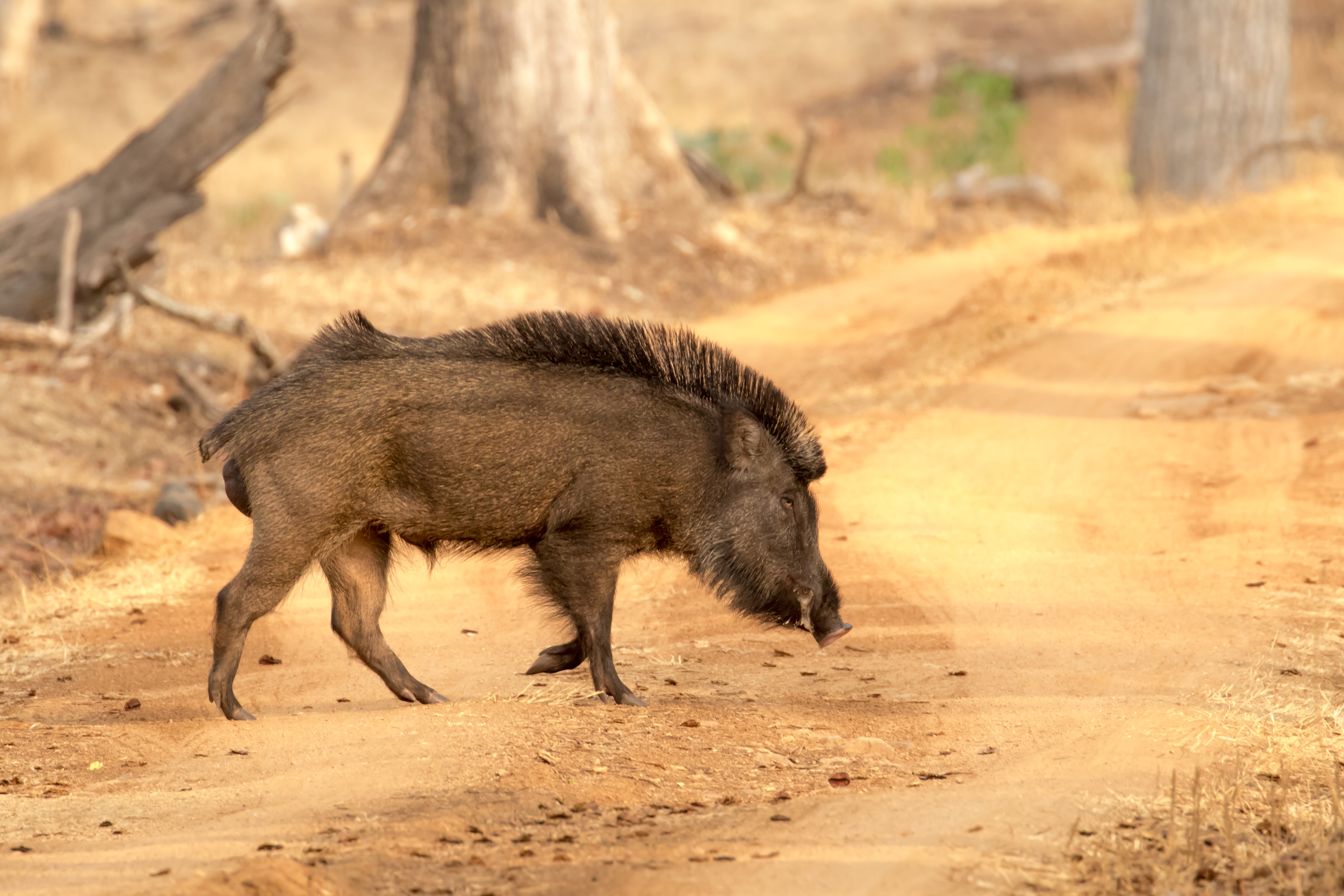
In Nagarhole National Park

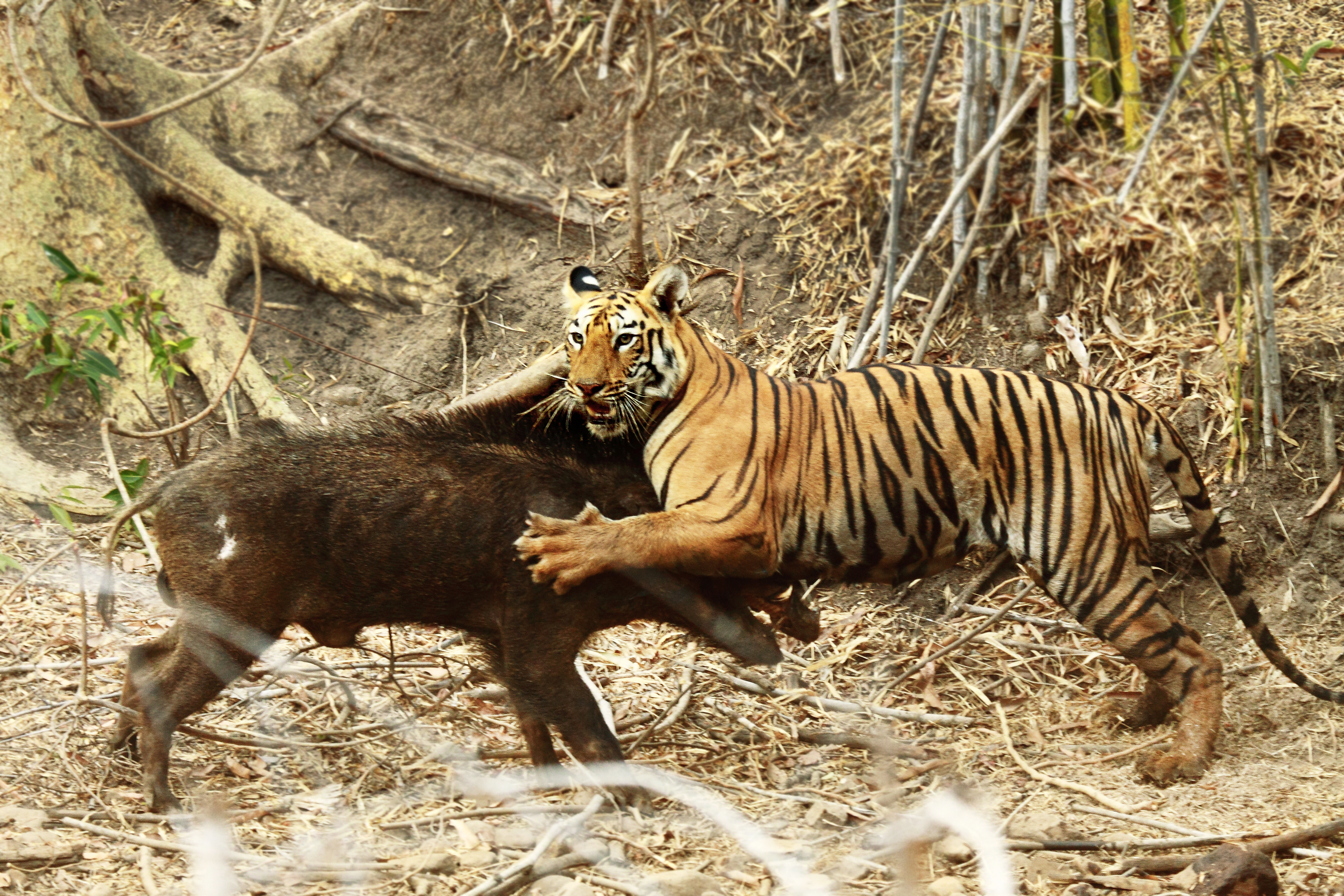
Hunted by a Bengal tiger at Tadoba Andhari Tiger Reserve

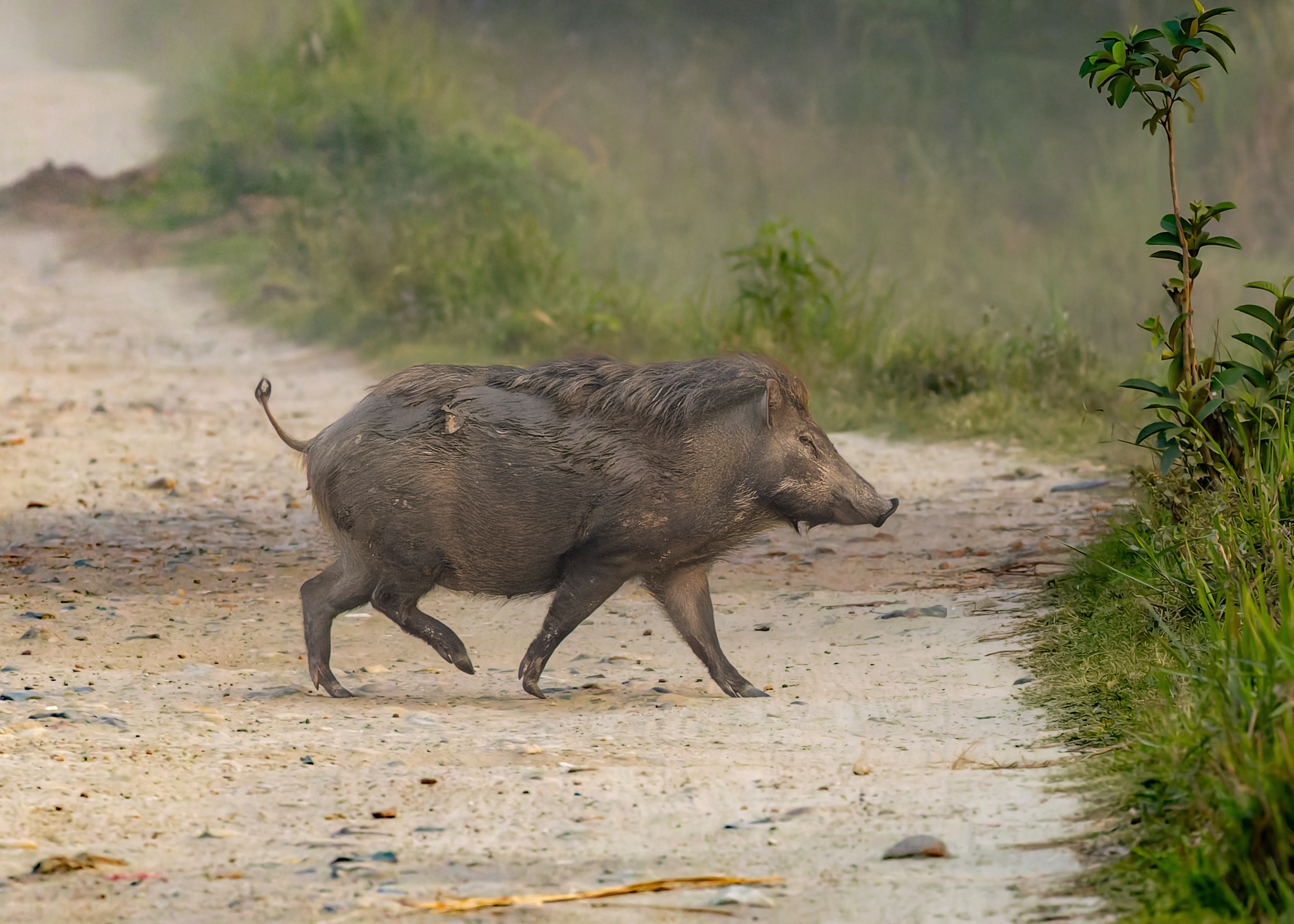
In Kaziranga National Park

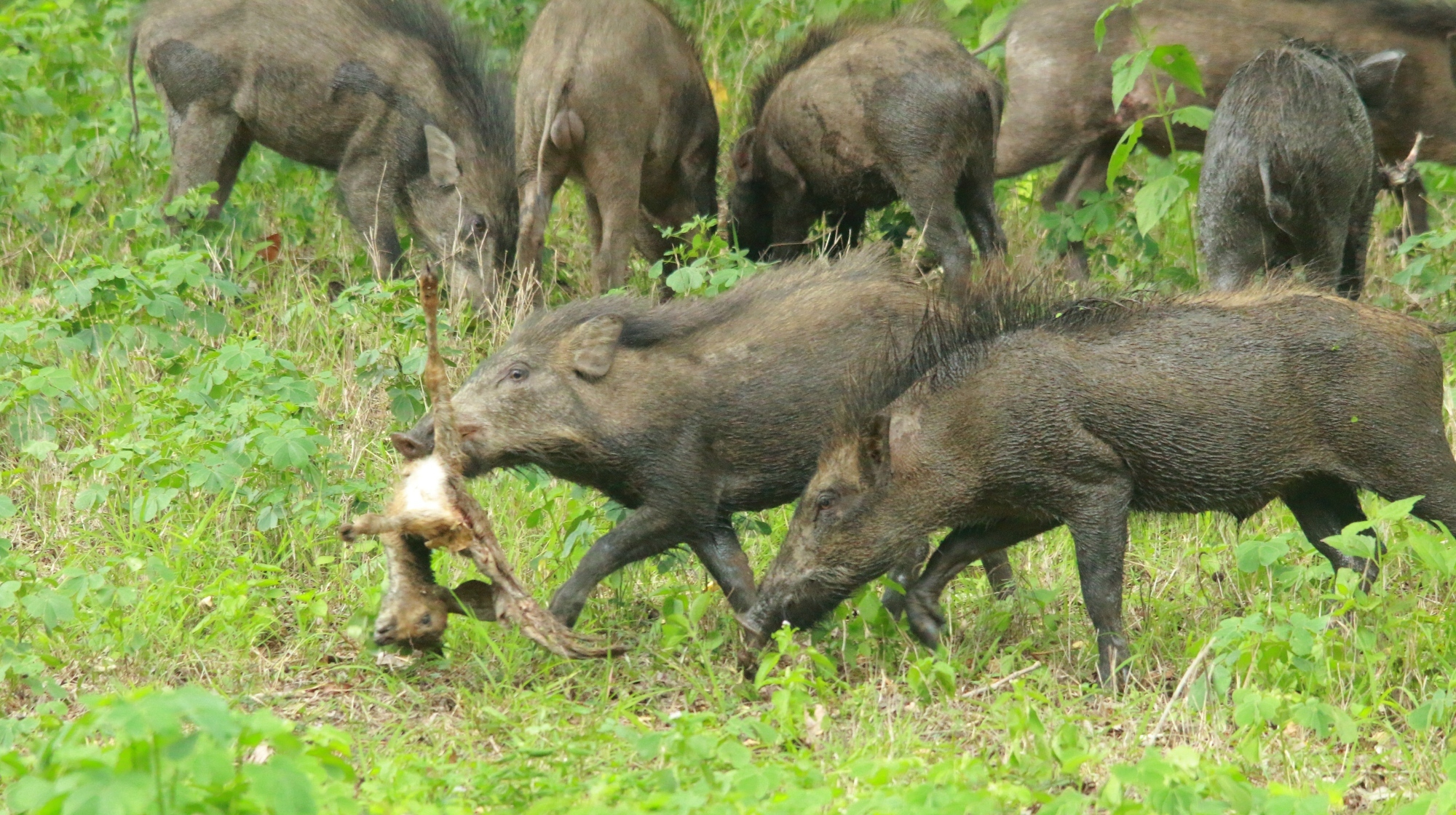
With a deer fawn

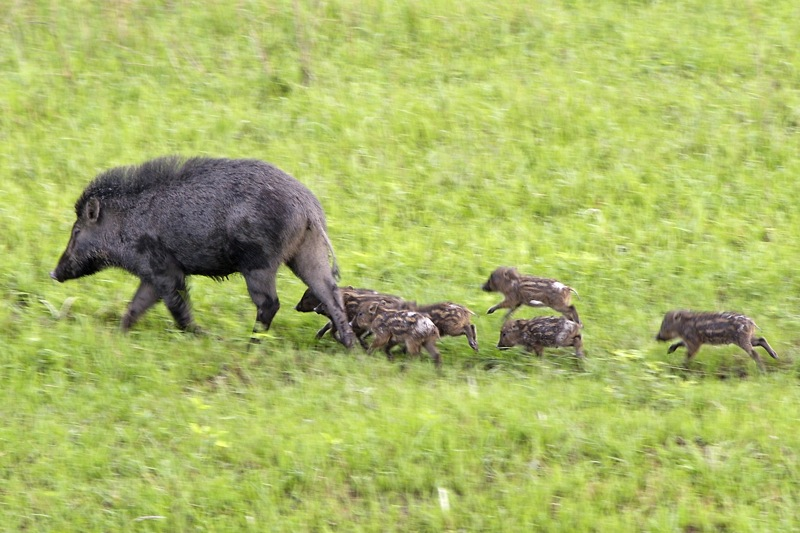
Wild boar with piglets in Kaziranga National Park, Assam

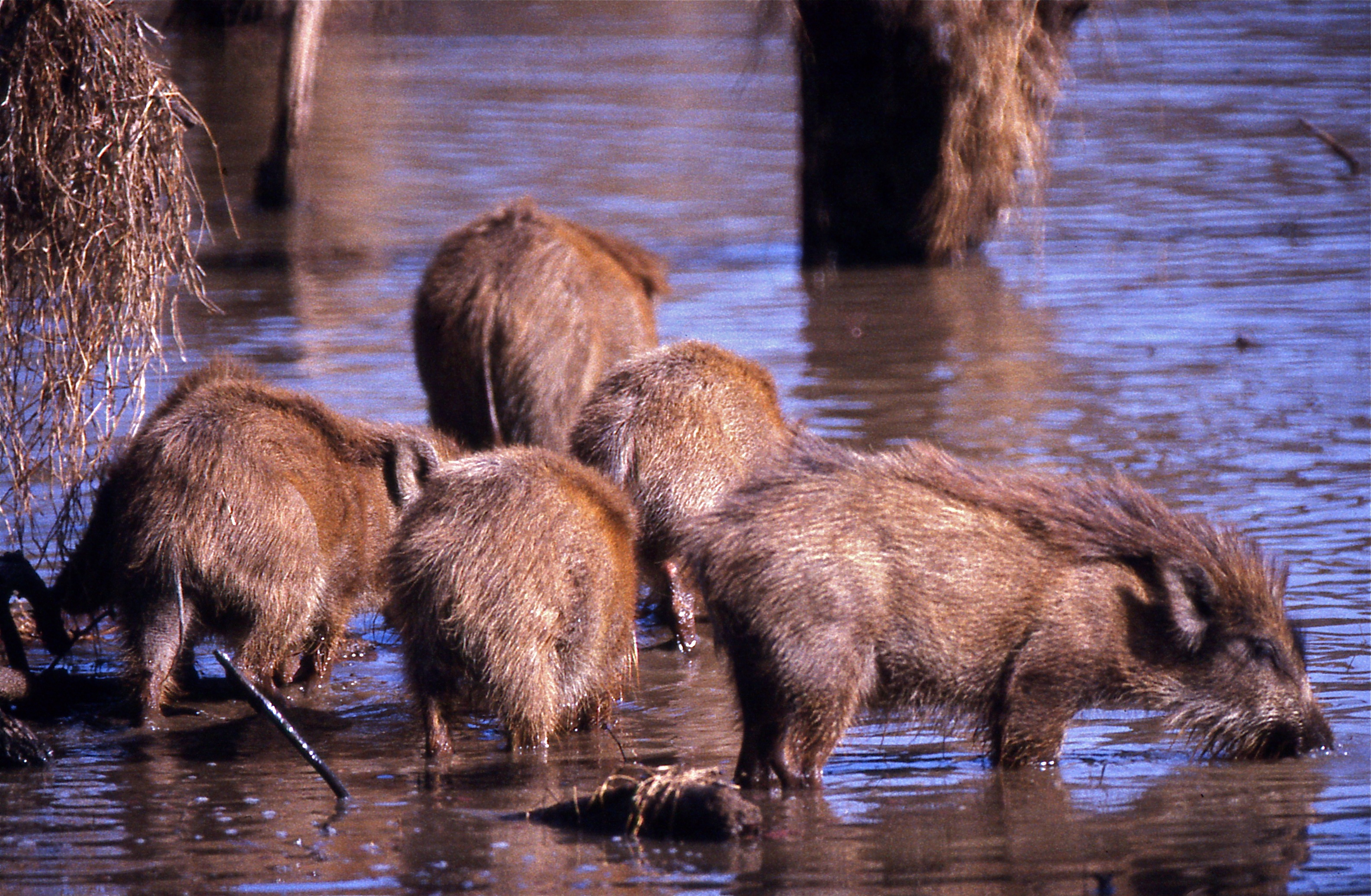
In water, Ranthambore National Park, Rajasthan, India

== See also ==
- Wild boar
