= Jaws of Death (film) =

- Directed by: Gautam Saikia
- Release date: 2005
- Country: India

Jaws of Death is a 2005 documentary by Gautam Saikia about animals at Kaziranga National Park being hit by vehicular traffic while crossing National Highway 37 in Assam state, India. The film is a winner of the Vatavaran Award.
