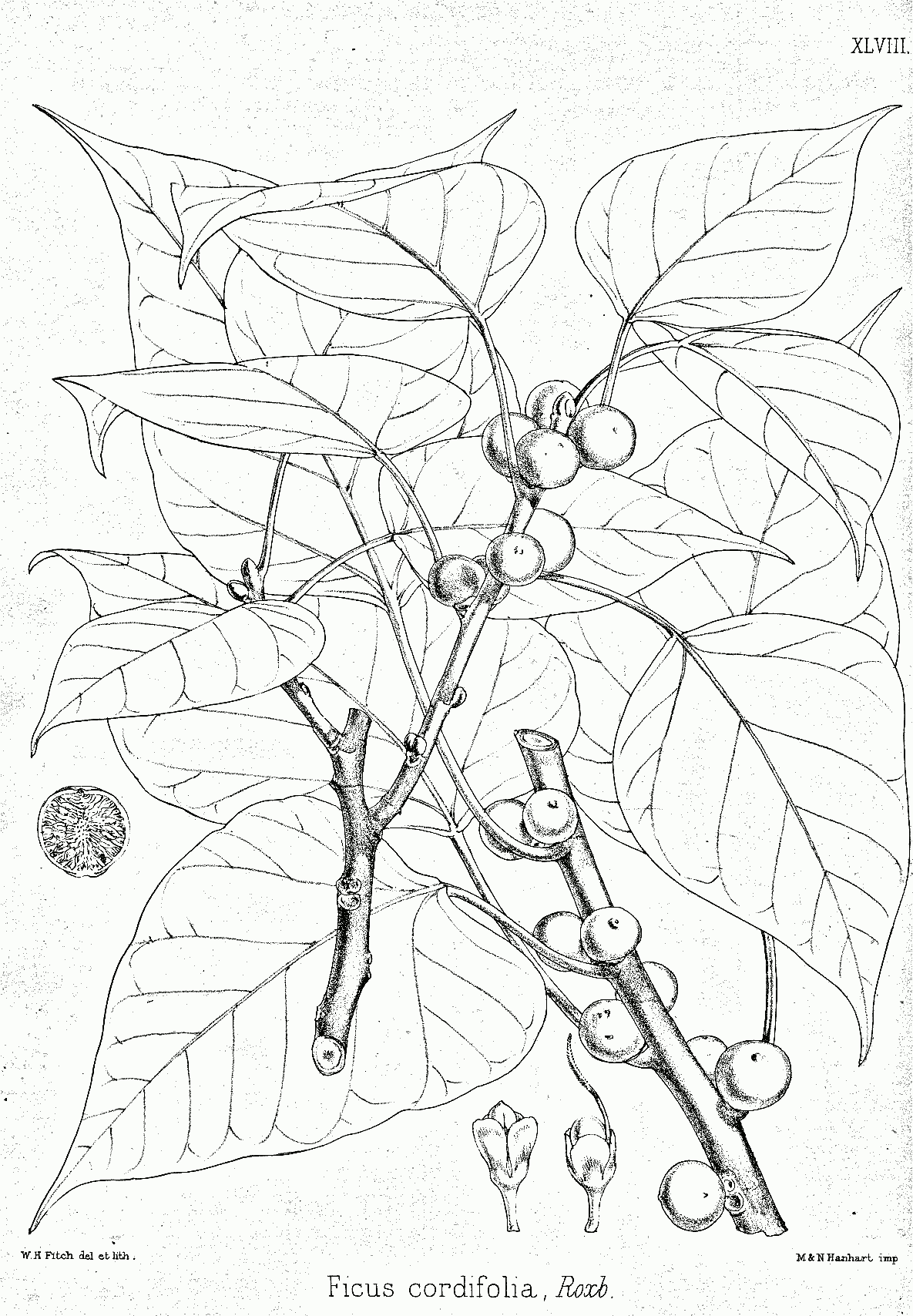

Conservation status
- Least Concern (IUCN 3.1)

Scientific classification
- Kingdom: Plantae
- Clade: Tracheophytes
- Clade: Angiosperms
- Clade: Eudicots
- Clade: Rosids
- Order: Rosales
- Family: Moraceae
- Genus: Ficus
- Subgenus: F. subg. Urostigma
- Species: F. rumphii

Binomial name
- Ficus rumphii Blume

Synonyms
- Ficus affinior Griff.; Ficus conciliorum Oken; Ficus cordifolia Roxb., nom. illeg. homonym. post.; Ficus coriacea Aiton; Ficus damit Gagnep.; Ficus populiformis Schott ex Miq.; Ficus populnea Kunth & C.D.Bouché, nom. illeg. homonym. post.; Urostigma cordifolium (Roxb.) Miq.; Urostigma rumphii (Bl.) Miq.

= Ficus rumphii =

Species of fig

Ficus rumphii is a banyan fig species in the family Moraceae. The species can be found in India, Nepal, Bangladesh, southern China (Yunnan), Indo-China, and Peninsular Malaysia, Java, the Lesser Sunda Islands, Sulawesi, and Maluku in Malesia. In Vietnam it may be called lâm vồ or đa mít.

The species was described by Carl Ludwig Blume in 1825. No subspecies are listed in the Catalogue of Life.

== Gallery ==
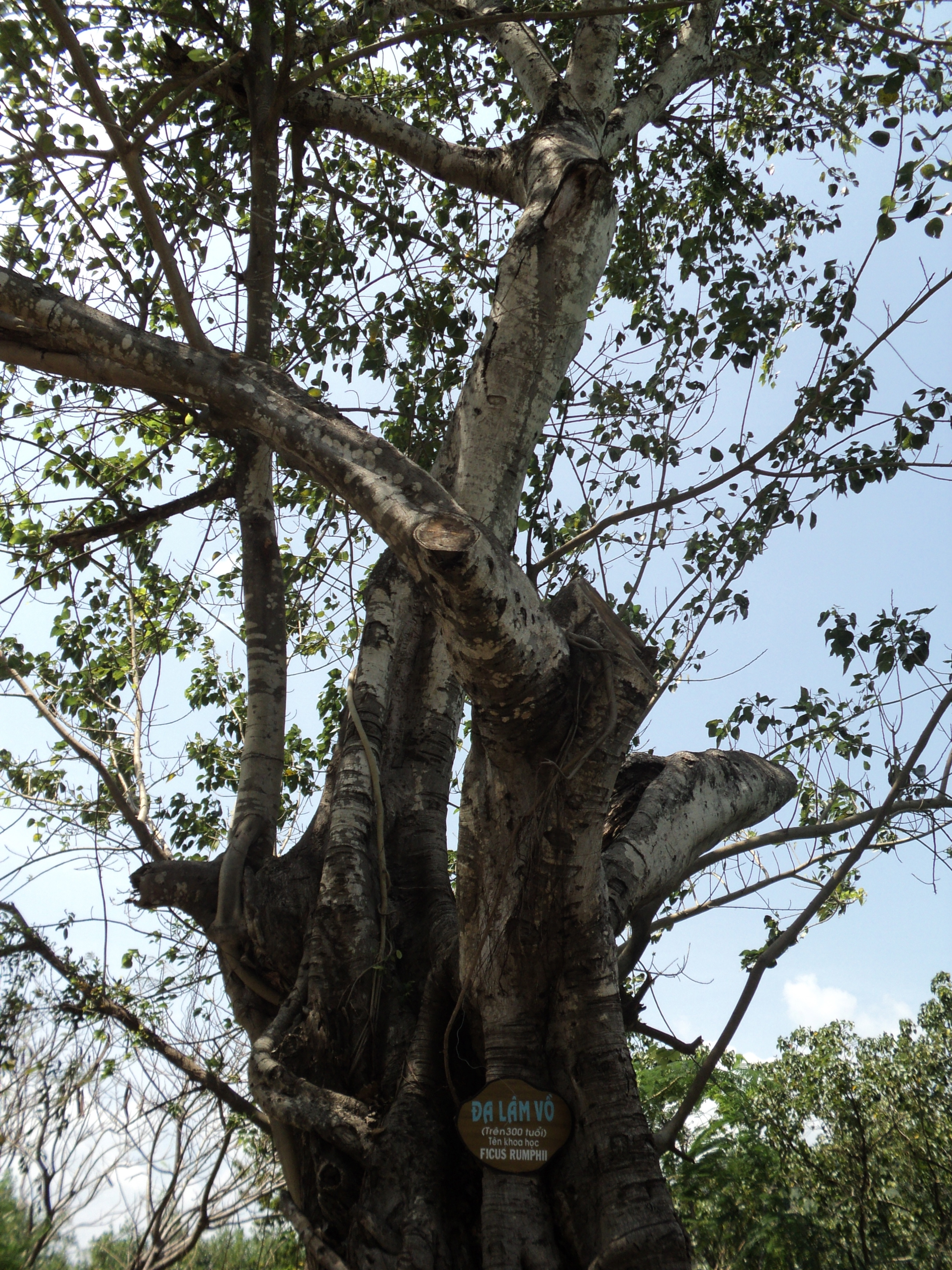

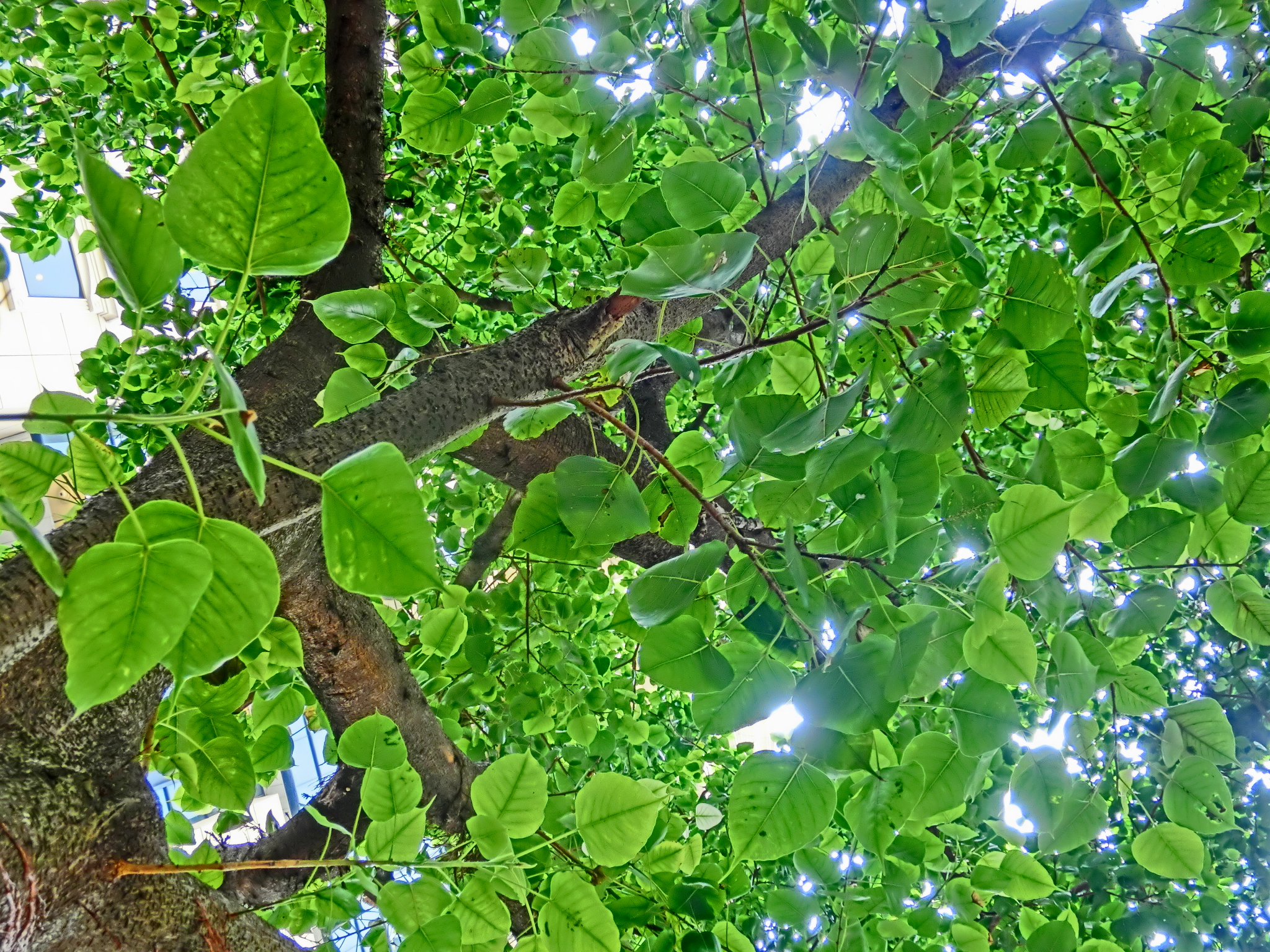

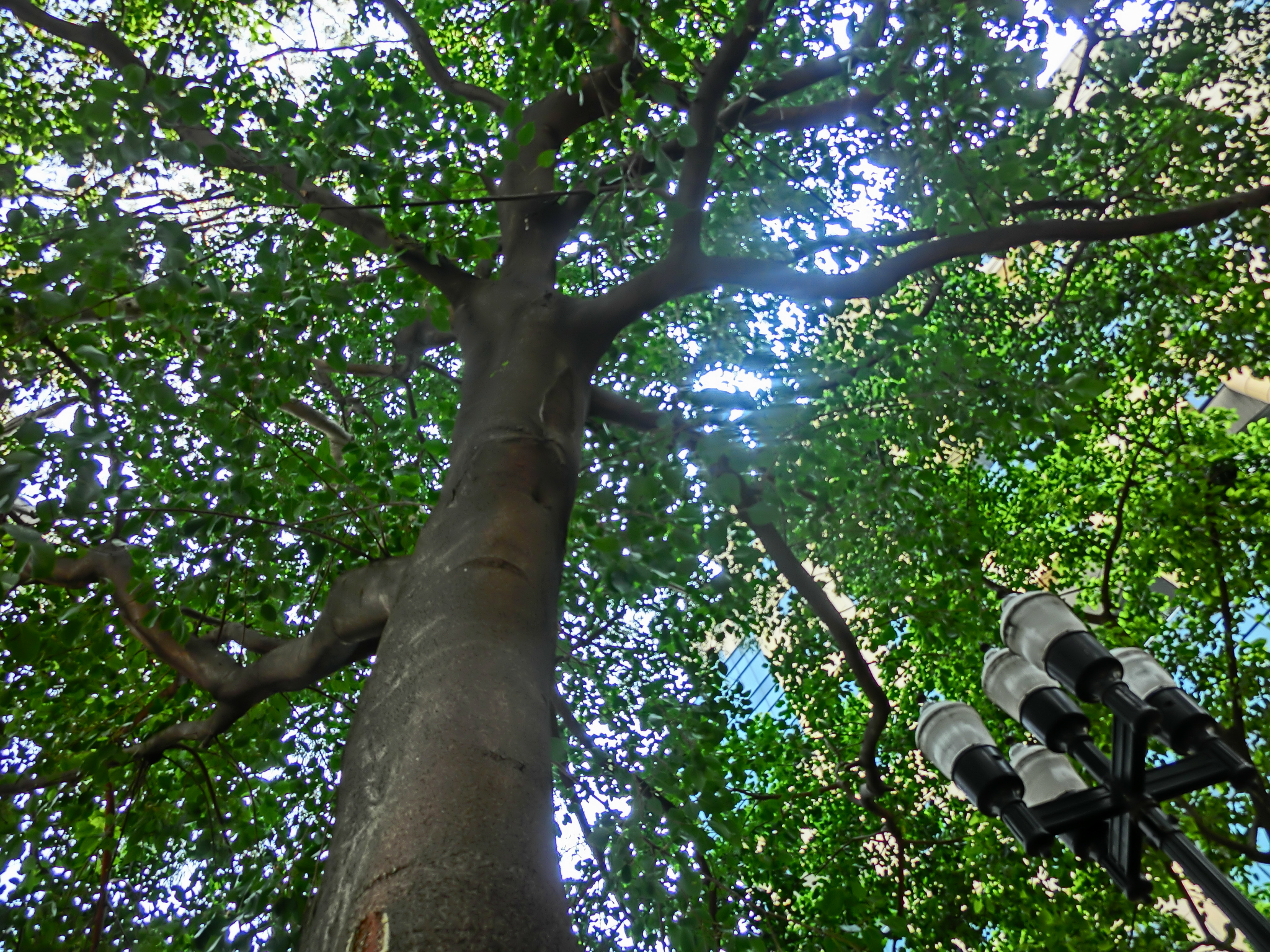

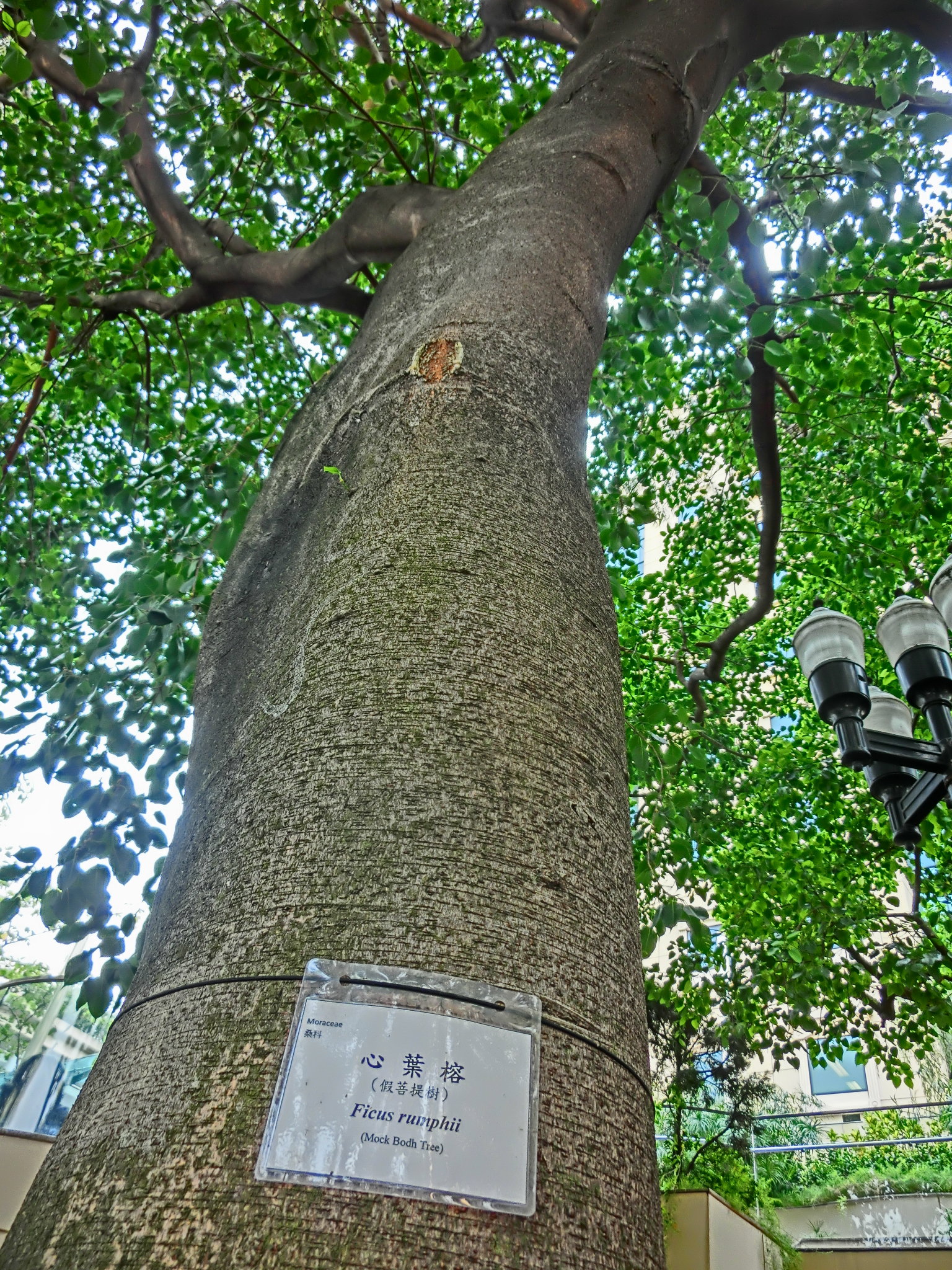
