= Dergaon =

- Town
- Location in Assam, India Dergaon (India)
- Coordinates: 26.7°N 93.97°E
- Country: India
- State: Assam
- District: Golaghat

Government
  - Body: Dergaon Municipal Board
- Elevation: 82 m (269 ft)

Population (2011)
  - Total: 20,097
  - Rank: 29 th (Assam)

Languages
  - Official: Assamese
- Time zone: UTC+5:30 (IST)
- Vehicle registration: AS 05 (Golaghat)

Dergaon (IPA: ˈdɜːˌgɑ̃ʊ) is a town and a municipality in the Golaghat district of Assam, India. It is 282 km from Guwahati.

Bhaxar Oja Hemchandra Barua, the compiler of Hemkosh (the earliest Assamese-English dictionary) was from Dergaon.

== History ==
Dergaon also known as Devargaon which implies the village of god Shiva. This area was captured from the Kacharis during the reign of Suhungmung. It has the famous Negheriting Shiva Doul constructed by Swargadeo Rajeswar Singha in 1765.

Ahoms kings had established here a royal station (Rajabahor), a Pilkhana (centre of elephant training) and a dockyard called Negeri Noasali.

== Geography ==
Dergaon is located at 26.7°N 93.97°E. It has an average elevation of 82 metres (269 feet).

== Demographics ==
As of 2001 India census, Dergaon had a population of 13,364. Males constitute 56% of the population and females 44%. Dergaon has an average literacy rate of 85%, higher than the national average of 59.5%: male literacy is 88% and, female literacy is 81%. In Dergaon, 10% of the population is under 6 years of age.

== Politics ==
Dergaon is a part of Kaziranga (Lok Sabha constituency). Kamakhya Prasad Tasa of Bharatiya Janata Party is the incumbent MP since the year 2024.

Dergaon (Vidhan Sabha constituency) is a constituency in the 126 member Assam Legislative Assembly. The current MLA is Mridul Kumar Dutta of the Bharatiya Janata Party (BJP), succeeding Bhabendra Nath Bharali of the Asom Gana Parishad (AGP).

== Transport ==
Dergaon is very well connected by roadways to all the places of Assam. The National Highway 37 passes through Dergaon. Barua Bamun Gaon (BBGN) railway station is the nearest station to Dergaon, located about 5 km away. The nearest airport is Jorhat Airport which is at Jorhat town.

== Education ==
Dergaon Kamal Dowerah College (DKD College) (website), Police Training College (website) and Dergaon Higher Secondary School are some of the oldest educational institutions in Dergaon. Started in 1908, Dergaon Higher Secondary School has recently observed its 100's anniversary. Besides these, the Girls' H.S. School, Indrani Devi High School and Shishu Bharati High School. Don Bosco High School, established in 1995, English medium school of the town, had the first result of HSLC in 2007. Shankardev Shishu Niketan, Dergaon, pioneer in Assamese medium for private sector schools, apart from this Shankardev Sishu Niketan Kakodonga, located in Majukuchi gaon and established in the year 2001. There are a number of private junior colleges and schools in Dergaon, among these Radiant College, Udayan Academy, Alpine English School, Maria Nivas School are some of the well known private institutions in the town.

== Notable people ==
- Hemchandra Barua, Assamese writer, social reformer
- Syed Abdul Malik, Assamese author, poet
- Nilmani Phookan Jr, Assamese poet and academic.
- Anil Barua, former editor in-chief of Dainik Asam from 1995 to 2002.
