= Hemchandra Barua (disambiguation) =

Hemchandra may refer to:

- Hemchandra Barua (1836–1897), writer, lexicographer and social reformer
- Hem Barua (Tyagbir) or Hemchandra Barua (1893–1945), writer, freedom fighter, social worker
- Hem Barua (1915–1977), Parliamentarian, Socialist leader, writer, poet, historian and Educationist

== See also ==
- Hemchandra Goswami (1872–1928), writer, poet, historian, Principal of and a linguist from Assam
