= Bokakhat =

- Town
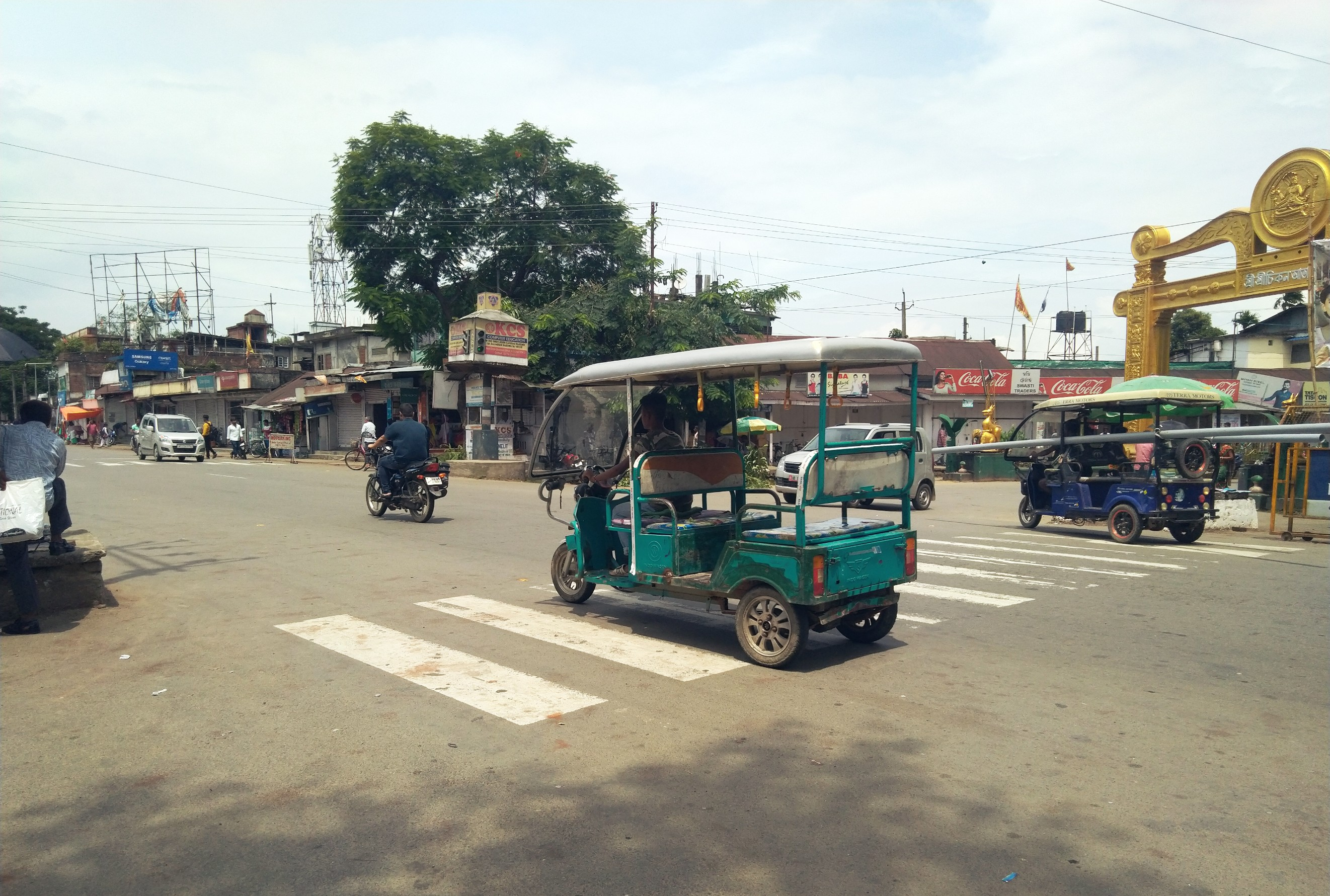
- Bokakhat town

- Location in Assam Location in India
- Coordinates: 26.63°N 93.6°E
- Country: India
- State: Assam
- District: Golaghat district

Government
  - Body: Bokakhat Municipality Board
- Elevation: 76 m (249 ft)

Population (2001)
  - Total: 8,844

Languages
  - Official: Assamese
- Time zone: UTC+5:30 (IST)
- PIN: 785612
- Telephone code: 03776
- ISO 3166 code: IN-AS
- Vehicle registration: AS 05
- Website: www.bokakhat.gov.in

Bokakhat (/ˌboʊkəˈkɑːt/ BOH-kə-KAHT) is a town in Assam and a Municipality Board in Golaghat district in the state of Assam, India. It is about 23 km away from the world heritage site Kaziranga National Park. Bokakhat town is situated almost in the middle of Assam. It is the headquarters of Bokakhat subdivision. The town is base to many nearby tourist places and is well connected to other cities and towns by road. The Kaipho Langso waterfall, an important picnic spot surrounded with magnificent views, lies in Karbi Anglong 13 km away from Bokakhat. Other nearby attractions include the ruins of the ancient Numaligarh and the Deoparbat, the tea gardens of Hatikhuli, Methoni, Diffloo Behora and Borsapori and also the coffee and rubber plantations. The nearest airports are at Jorhat and Guwahati. The nearest railway stations are Badulipar and Furkating.

== Demographics ==
As of 2011 India census, Bokakhat had a population of 2 Lakhs. Males constitute 54% of the population and females 46%. Bokakhat has an average literacy rate of 78%, higher than the national average of 59.5%; with male literacy of 83% and female literacy of 73%. 11% of the population is under 6 years of age.

== Attractions ==
The main attractions of the area are natural spots, wildlife, temples, historical sites, archaeological remains, monasteries (satras), industries, various festivals, tea gardens, hills, handicrafts, hand loom products, roadside hotels and tourist lodges. Almost all the requirements of modern tourism can be fulfilled by Kaziranga National Park, Kaziranga National Orchid & Bio-Diversity Park, NRL and the Butterfly Garden, boating and sight-seeing of the park by boat, Karbi Anglong, golf court, Oriole Park, Kaipho Langso Waterfalls, Chikan Ata than, Deo Pahar, Kuruabahi Satra, etc.

== History ==
Bokakhat was formerly known as Namdoiang, as it was located far downstream of the river Doiang.

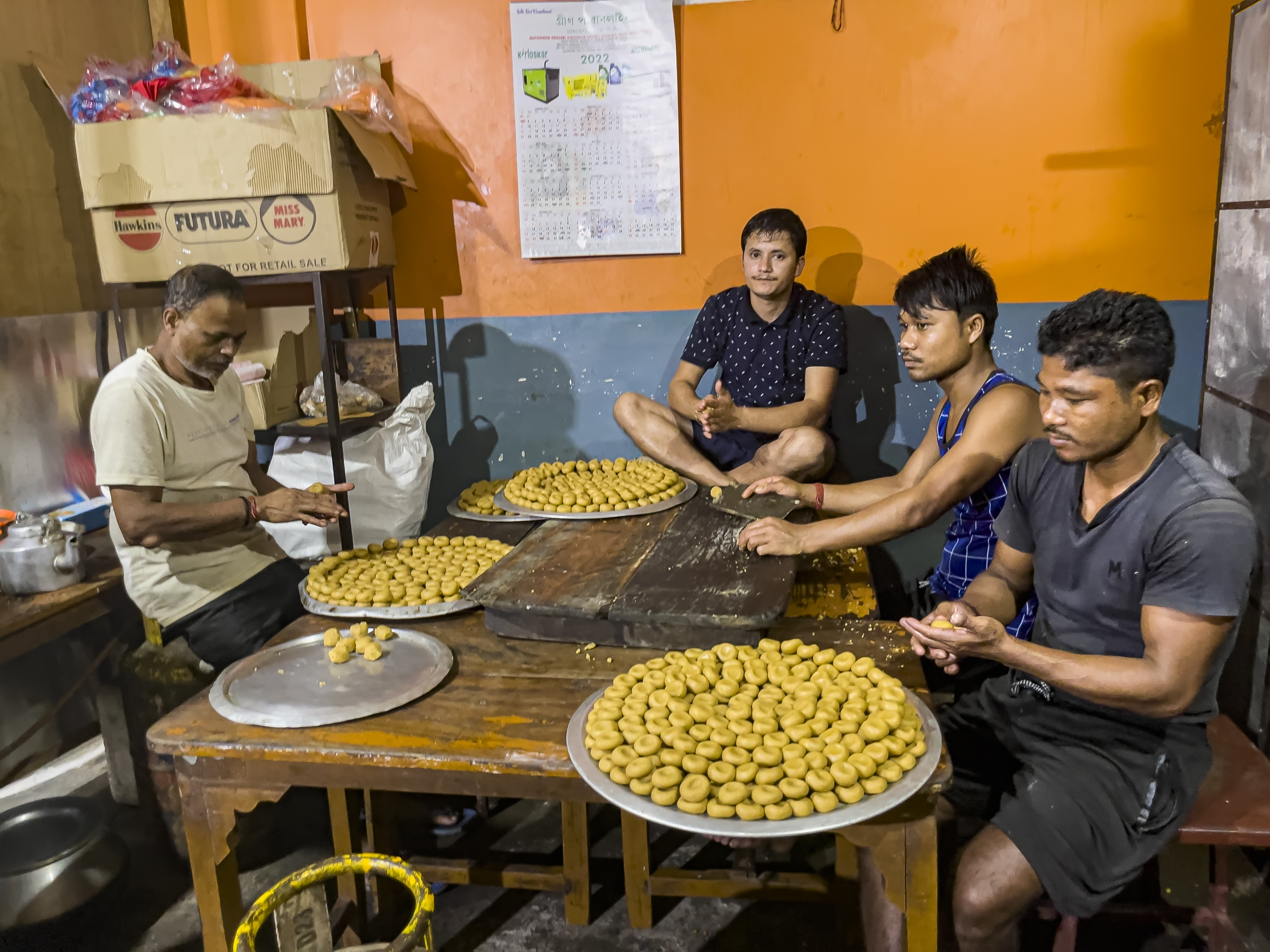
Bokakhat is famous for its Peda/Pera Sweet. In picture: Workers making Peda/Pera at Bokakhat

== Education ==
Bokakhat area is full of Govt. and Private L.P, M.E and also High Schools with good faculties. Other higher study institutes like J.D.S.G College (Arts & Commerce), C.N.B College (Science) etc. and some private colleges are also located at the town.

== Transport ==
Bokakhat is well connected by roadways. The National Highway 715 passes through Bokakhat.

== Politics ==
Bokakhat is part of Kaliabor (Lok Sabha constituency) and Bokakhat is a Rajya sabha constituency.

== Bokakhat News ==
Bokakhat News

== Festivals ==
Being a cosmopolitan town, people of Bokakhat celebrates many Indian festivals from different religions throughout the year. Since, the majority of the population is Assamese, the Bihu is the prime festival of the town. Apart from that, the people celebrates other festivals like Durga Puja, Diwali, Sankardev and Madhavdev tithis, Eid, Christmas, Horinam Sankirtan very well. Assamese is the largest community in Bokakhat with other communities like Bengali, Bihari, Marwari, Sikh, Jain, Nepali, Etc.

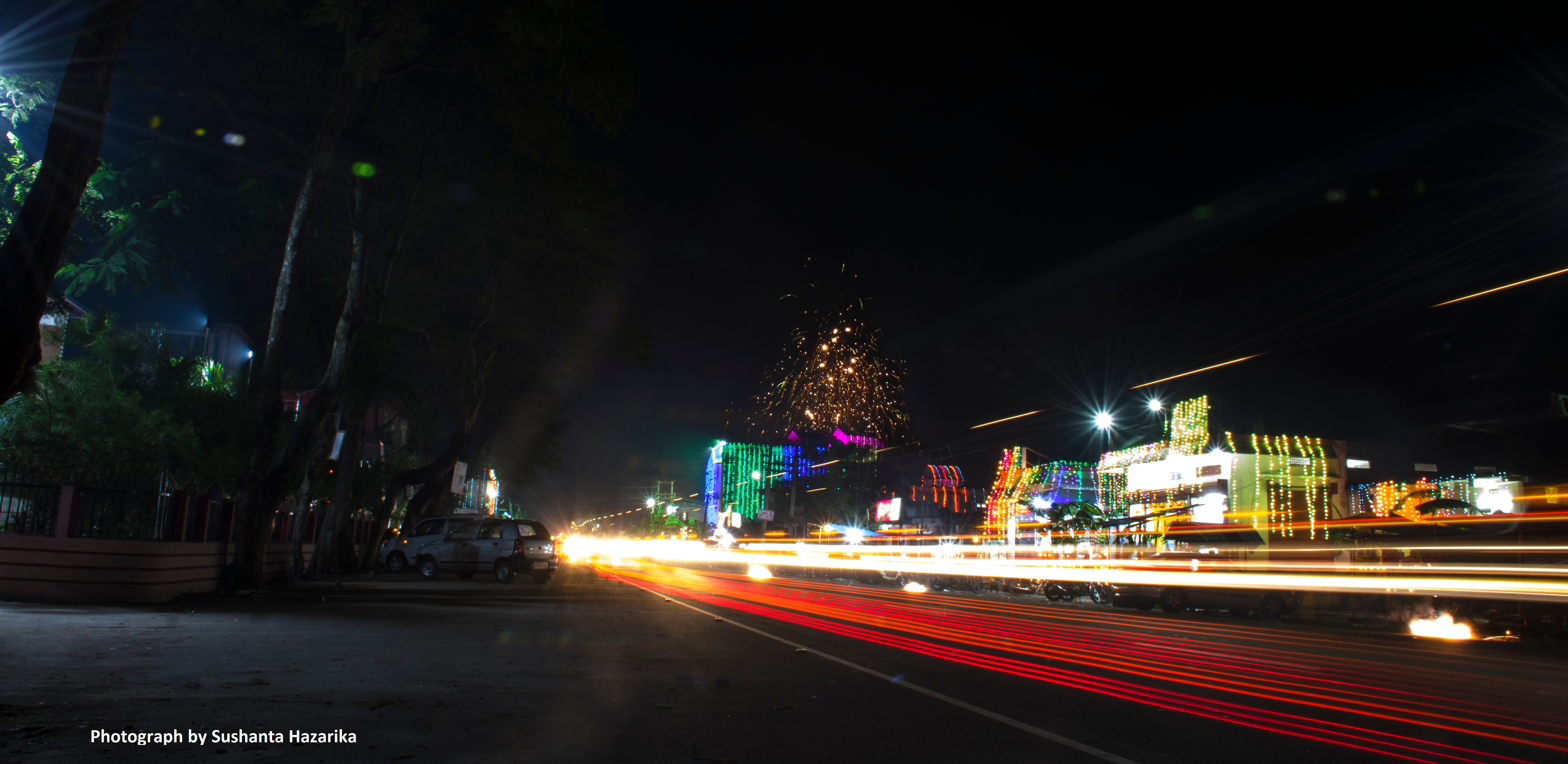
Diwali-night-at-Bokakhat
