= Kaiborta Gaon =

Village in Golaghat district, Assam, India

- Village
- Map of Assam Kaiborta Gaon (India)
- Coordinates: 26.69338°N 93.90826°E
- Country: India
- State: Assam
- District: Golaghat
- Gram Panchayat: Rongamati Koibarta

Area
  - Total: 369.46 ha (913.0 acres)
- Elevation: 100 m (330 ft)

Population (2011)
  - Total: 6,327
  - Density: 1,712/km^{2} (4,435/sq mi)

Languages
  - Official: Assamese
- Time zone: UTC+5:30 (IST)
- Postal code: 785614
- STD Code: 03774
- Vehicle registration: AS-05
- Census code: 294307

Kaiborta Gaon is a census village in Golaghat district, Assam, India. As per the 2011 Census of India, Kaiborta Gaon has a total population of 6,327 people, including 3,227 males and 3,100 females with a literacy rate of 55.56%.
