= Bonkuwal =

Bonkuwal, also referred to as Bonqual, is a village in Golaghat district of Assam, India. According to the 2011 Census of India, it has a population of 2,758.
