= Archana =

Archana may refer to:

- Archana (Hinduism), a type of puja (prayer ritual)
- Archana (moth), a genus of moth
- Archana (film), Indian Malayalam film in 1967

== People with the given name ==
- Archana (actress) (active from 1980), Indian actress and dancer
- Archana (Kannada actress) - Kannada actress
- Archana Borthakur (born 1983), Indian social worker and writer
- Archana Chandhoke (active from 2002), Tamil television anchor and film actress
- Archana Mahanta (born 1949), Indian folk singer
- Archana Nayak (born 1966), Indian politician
- Archana Puran Singh (born 1962), Indian television presenter, personality and film actress
- Archana Udupa (active from 1998), Indian Kannada singer
- Veda Sastry or Archana (active from 2004), Indian actress
- Archana Ravichandran (active from 2020), Indian television actress
- Archana Ravi, Indian model
