= Mridul Kumar Dutta =

Indian politician (born 1961)

Mridul Kumar Dutta (born 1961) is an Indian politician from Assam. He is a member of the Assam Legislative Assembly from the Dergaon Assembly constituency in Golaghat district representing the Bharatiya Janata Party.

== Early life ==
Dutta is from Dergaon, Golaghat district, Assam. He is the son of the late Budheswar Dutta. He is a retired professor. He completed his Doctor of Philosophy (PhD) at Dibrugarh University, Assam, in 2006. He declared assets worth Rs.1 crore in his affidavit to the Election Commission of India.

== Career ==
Dutta won the Dergaon Assembly constituency representing the Bharatiya Janata Party in the 2026 Assam Legislative Assembly election. He polled 90,049 votes and defeated his nearest rival, Sagorika Bora of the Indian National Congress, by a margin of 36,953 votes.
