= Sarupathar =

- Sub-Divisional Headquarter
- Location in Assam, India Sarupathar (India)
- Coordinates: 26.194053°N 93.866083°E
- Country: India
- State: Assam
- District: Golaghat

Government
  - Body: Sarupathar Municipal Corporation
  - SUB-DIVISIONAL OFFICER(Civil): Dr P Uday Praveen IAS

Area
  - Total: 3.5 km^{2} (1.4 sq mi)

Population (2011)
  - Total: 10,827
  - Density: 3,100/km^{2} (8,000/sq mi)

Languages
  - Official: Assamese
- Time zone: UTC+5:30 (IST)
- PIN: 785601
- Area code: 03774
- Vehicle registration: AS-05

Sarupathar is a town and the Sub-Divisional headquarter of Dhansiri Sub-Division in Golaghat district in the state of Assam, India.

== Etymology ==
In assamese, 'Xoru/Saru' means 'Small in Size', 'Pothaar/Pathar' means 'Paddy Fields'.

== Demographics ==
As of 2011 India census, Sarupathar had a population of 10,827. Males constitute 55% of the population and females 45%. Sarupathar has an average literacy rate of 60%, higher than the national average of 59.5%: male literacy is 84%, and female literacy is 77%. In Sarupathar, 11% of the population is under 6 years of age. A majority of Assamese and Bengali live here with major other communities like Gorkha, Marwari, Manipuri, Tea-Labourer Community, Muslim, Kochari and few others live here. The majority of Sarupathar's population are Hindu, but other religions like Islam, Buddhism, Christianity are also found here.

== Government & Politics ==
Sarupathar is part of Kaziranga Lok Sabha constituency. The current Member of Parliament representing Kaziranga is Kamakhya Prasad Tasa. The current Member of Legislative Assembly representing Sarupathar is Biswajit Phukan.

=== Local Administration ===
The Sarupathar Municipal Corporation is responsible for the maintaining town's civic infrastructure as well as carrying out associated administrative duties. The Town Committee is constituted by elected members from each wards. The entire town has been divided into four wards, and one member is elected from each ward. One ward is reserved for women. The term is for a five-year duration after which elections are held once again.

== Education ==
Under the 10+2 format, students attend primary and secondary schooling during the first ten years and then two years of higher secondary education, followed by three years at college for commerce or arts degrees.

=== Schools ===
There are three government high schools and several govt. Lower Primary (LP) and Middle English (ME) Schools in the heart of Sarupathar Town. The high schools are viz. P M Shri Sarupathar Higher Secondary School, Kalibari High School & Sarupathar Girls' High School. P M Shri Sarupathar Higher Secondary School is the oldest school of Sarupathar. Founded by Jogeshwar Chetia in 1956.

The private English medium schools are Bolosing Memorial School (BMS), Dayanand Vidya Niketan (DVN), Don Bosco High School, Daffodil English High School, Keshav Chandra Hazarika Memorial School (KCH) and Marvel Minds Academy. The only private assamese medium school in the town is Sankardev Sishu Niketan. Dayanand Vidya Niketan was founded by Mr. Shivaji Rai in the year 1990. Bolosing Memorial School was also founded by Mr. Shivaji Rai in the year 1993. Both DVN and BMS are among the schools in the town. Marvel Minds Academy, was established in the year 2016.

=== College ===
There are three colleges in Sarupathar Sarupathar College, Ideal Junior CollegeandSwahid Kushal Konwar Girls College The biggest and the oldest college is the Sarupathar College which was established in 1070. Sarupathar College, affiliated to Dibrugarh University, offers various courses in Commerce and Arts.It also has study centre of KKHSOU which offers various PG courses in distant modes.

== Notable people ==
- Kushal Konwar, Freedom Fighter
