= Archana Borthakur =

Indian woman social worker

- অৰ্চনা বৰঠাকুৰ
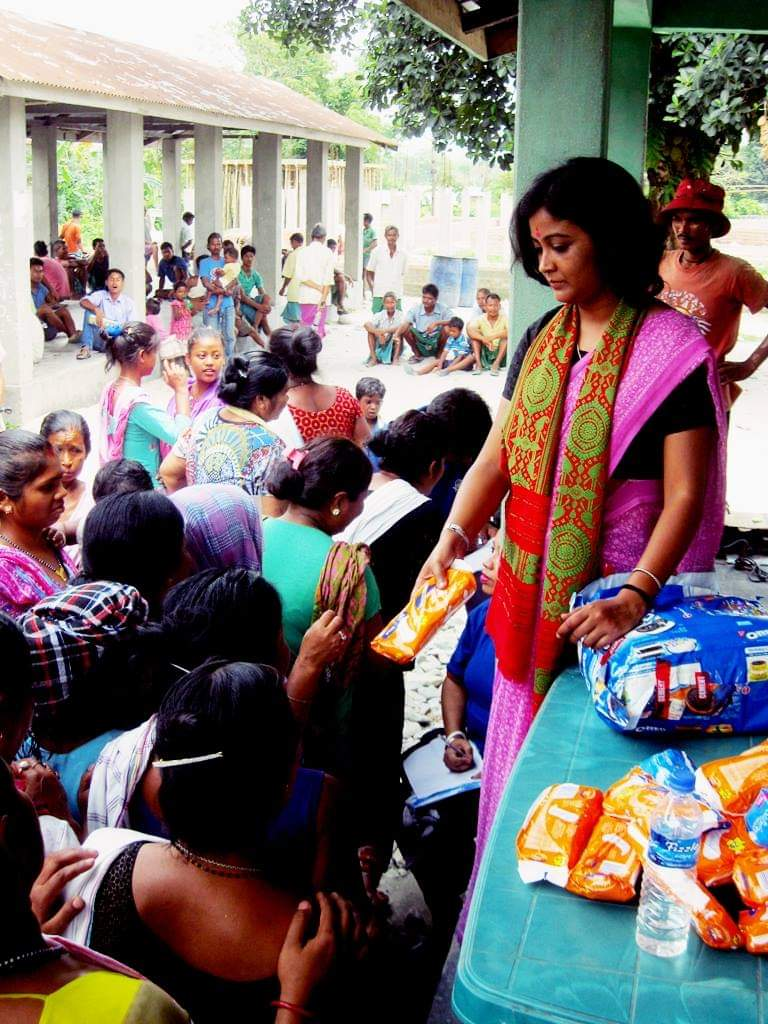
- Borthakur distributing sanitary pads in Chirang district of Assam
- Born: 23 October 1983 (age 42); Dergaon, Golaghat district, Assam, India
- Other name: Archie
- Occupations: Social worker; Writer

Archana Borthakur (Assamese: অৰ্চনা বৰঠাকুৰ) is an Indian social activist from Assam. Borthakur founded social welfare society Priyobondhu in pursuit of community development and social change. She is known for her social works like donation of unused clothes, foods, books and household tools to the underprivileged.

== Early life and education ==
Borthakur was born at Dergaon in Golaghat district of Assam. She did her matriculation from Dergaon Girls Higher Secondary School in 2000 and higher secondary from Kamal Deorah College in 2002. Borthakur completed her BA & MA in Assamese literature from Cotton College.

== Social work ==
Borthakur launched a programme titled 'Positive Lights' in 2016 to provide right treatment and care to HIV+ orphaned children. She has also arranged to decorate the care home of such children with lights and Rangoli and distributed food packets and educational materials along with other essential commodities collected from people.

In 2018, Borthakur initiated a programme for children under the name and style of ‘Breakfast for a child’.

Borthakur distributed school bags, pencil boxes, fluxes, tiffin boxes, erasers, wood pencils, colour pencils, picture books, exercise copies to below poverty level children in 2018. Khetri area on the outskirts of Guwahati was covered during this mission.

Borthakur is educating girls in rural Assam about menstruation and making menstrual hygiene accessible to the underprivileged girls.

Borthakur launched a survey project on child labour in 2020 with the help of Guwahati district administration. A survey was conducted on children from the age group of 9 to 14 years.

== Literary works ==
Borthakur is the author of three novels Poridhi, Aparajita and Cottonian ekhon rodor khiriki, Sunyatar Xipare Tathagata, Hothat Bhalpuwai Kole, Abishwashi Samoi Stabdha Jibon.
