= Sapjuri =

Sapjuri is a small village in Golaghat district situated five kilometres away from Bokakhat, Assam and the NH 37 running through its heart. It is surrounded by two huge ranges of tea gardens, one being Lotabari Tea Estate, under Tata Tea. The other being Methoni Tea Estate, which is also under the same company.

The name Sapjuri is derived from two different Assamese words 'Saap' and 'Juri' which means a small stream with many living snakes. However, the stream no longer exists nor do the snakes, unless the nearby Kaziranga forest range gets hit by flood.

Being a small village, it does has a government school where aspirant can pursue education till 10th standard named as 'Difloo Pathar High School'. If one is moving from Bokakhat to Sapjuri, one would see the Lord Shiva Temple at the border of this area along with Lambu Dhaba, which is very famous in the locality after which comes a bridge which exists because of the place's origin, it was provided for the extinct water stream filled with snakes. After the bridge, it is partly residential and partly shopping space after which starts the never ending range of tea gardens of Methoni Tea Estate towards the right and the high school towards the left. After that it is the village's panchayat office along with the Sapjuri general field for the sportsmen, this field is converted to a highly crowded market every Monday, known as Monday Sapjuri Market. Also, Sapjuri has a base camp for Indian Army a few hundred metres away from the market, after which the village reaches its other border and starts another area known as Borjuri.
