= Bokakhat subdivision =

- subdistrict
- Country: India
- State: Assam
- District: Golaghat

Languages
  - Official: Assamese
- Time zone: UTC+5:30 (IST)
- ISO 3166 code: IN-AS
- Vehicle registration: AS-
- Coastline: 0 kilometres (0 mi)

Bokakhat subdivision is a subdivision situated in the Golaghat district of Assam.
