= Dergaon Assembly constituency =

Constituency of the Assam legislative assembly in India

Dergaon
- Constituency No. 104 for the Assam Legislative Assembly

Constituency details
- Country: India
- Region: Northeast India
- State: Assam
- District: Golaghat
- Lok Sabha constituency: Kaziranga
- Established: 1957
- Reservation: None

Member of Legislative Assembly
- 16th Assam Legislative Assembly
- Incumbent Mridul Kumar Dutta
- Party: Bharatiya Janata Party
- Elected year: 2026

Dergaon Assembly constituency is one of the 126 assembly constituencies of Assam Legislative Assembly. Dergaon forms part of the Kaziranga Lok Sabha constituency.

== Details ==
Following are details on Dergaon Assembly constituency:

- Country: India
- State: Assam
- District: Jorhat district
- Lok Sabha Constituency: Kaziranga Lok Sabha constituency
- Area Includes: Kakodunga Dev. Block, Dergaon Municipality, Golaghat North Dev. Block(Part), Golaghat Central Dev. Block(Part), Golaghat East Dev. Block(Part), Jorhat Dev. Block(Part), Majuli Dev. Block (Part), North-West Dev. Block(Part)

== Members of Legislative Assembly ==
Election	Member	Party affiliation
1952	Debeswar Rajkhowa	Indian National Congress
1957	Ramnath Das Narendra Nath Sarma	Indian National Congress
1962	Ramnath Das	Indian National Congress
1965^	N.K. Hazaarika	Samyukta Socialist Party
1967	Narendra Nath Sarma	Samyukta Socialist Party
1972	Imalendra Baruah	Indian National Congress
1978	Ramesh Das	Janata Party
1983	Hemprakash Narayan	Indian National Congress
1985	Bhabendra Nath Bharali	Independent
1991	Hemprakash Narayan	Indian National Congress
1996	Sushila Hazarika	Asom Gana Parishad
2001	Hemprakash Narayan	Indian National Congress
2006	Sushila Hazarika	Asom Gana Parishad
2011	Aroti Hazarika Kachari	Indian National Congress
2016	Bhabendra Nath Bharali	Asom Gana Parishad
2021	Bhabendra Nath Bharali	Asom Gana Parishad
2026	Mridul Kumar Dutta	Bharatiya Janata Party

^ Indicates Bye-Elections

== Election results ==
=== 2026 ===
2026 Assam Legislative Assembly election: Dergaon
Party	Candidate	Votes	%	±%
BJP	Mridul Kumar Dutta	90049	60.59	
INDIA	Sagorika Bora	53096	35.72	
AAP	PULIN GOGOI	2902	1.95	
NOTA	NOTA	2583	1.74	
Margin of victory		36953		
Turnout		148630		
Rejected ballots				
Registered electors				
BJP gain from AGP		Swing		

=== 2016 ===
2016 Assam Legislative Assembly election: Dergaon
Party	Candidate	Votes	%	±%
AGP	Bhabendra Nath Bharali	63,079	52.29	
INC	Aroti Hazarika Kachari	46,807	38.80	
Independent	Rita Das	3,622	3.00	
Independent	Bhuban Chandra Saikia	3,225	2.67	
NCP	Ajit Hazarika	1,828	1.51	
NOTA	None of the above	2,050	1.69	
Majority		16,272	13.49	
Turnout		1,20,611	82.33	
Registered electors		1,46,486		
AGP gain from INC		Swing		

== See also ==
- Golaghat district
- Dergaon
- List of constituencies of Assam Legislative Assembly
