= Hemchandra Goswami =

Indian writer, poet, historian, teacher and linguist (1872–1928)

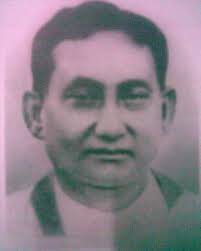
- Born: 8 January 1872; Golaghat district, Assam
- Died: 2 May 1928 (aged 56); Guwahati, Assam
- Education: Presidency college, Calcutta
- Occupations: Administrative officer, writer, poet, historian
- Writing career
- Language: Assamese

Hemchandra Goswami (1872–1928) was an Indian writer, poet, historian, teacher and a linguist from Assam in the early part of modern Assamese literature. He was the fourth president of the Asom Sahitya Sabha in 1920 held at Tezpur. He retired as Extra Assistant Commissioner in the British Assam.

== Literacy works ==
Goswami published the first Assamese dictionary, Hemkosh by Hemchandra Barua with the help of Colonel Gordon in 1900. Some of his other works include Asamiya sahityar chaneki, Phular Saki (The Bunch of Flowers, 1907), which contains the first sonnet in Assamese — 'Priyatamar Sithi' (A letter from the beloved), Kako aru hiya nibilao etc. 'Katha Gita' (Gita in Prose) of Bhattadev was edited by him in 1918 and Purani Asam Buranji . which contains the first sonnet in Assamese — 'Priyatamar Cithi' (A letter from the beloved)

== See also ==
- History of Assamese literature
- List of Assamese writers with their pen names
- List of Indian poets
- Assamese literature
- List of Assamese-language poets
