= Manoj Gogoi =

Indian wildlife conservationist and animal rescuer

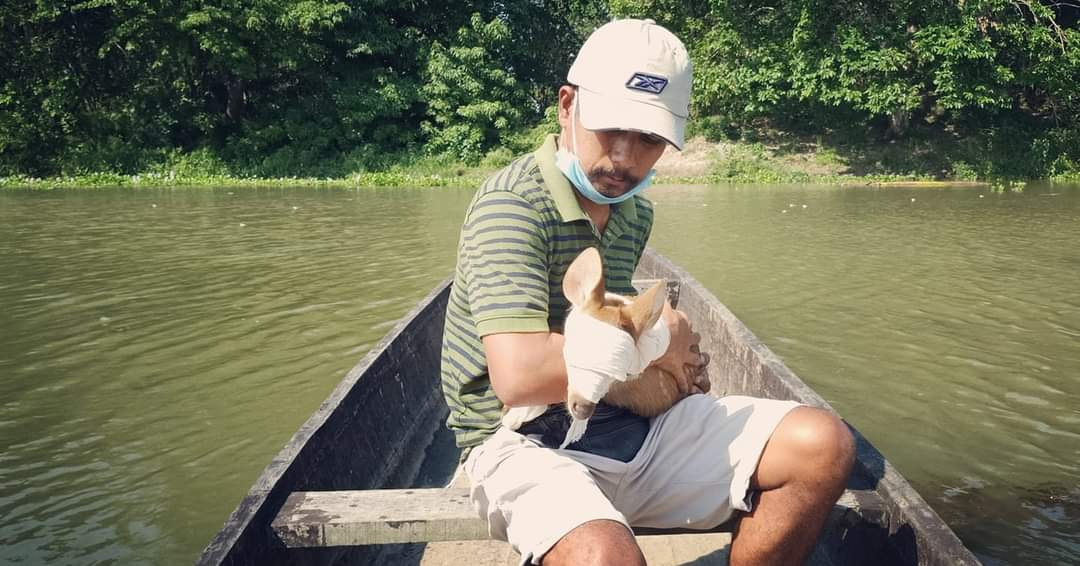
- Manoj Gogoi rescues an injured Indian hog deer at Kaziranga National Park
- Born: 4 January 1975 (age 51); Bochagaon, Kaziranga National Park, Golaghat district, Assam
- Occupations: Wildlife conservationist and Wildlife rehabilitationist
- Spouse: Kashmiri Saikia Gogoi
- Parent(s): Junaram Gogoi (Father); Rupa Gogoi (Mother)

Manoj Gogoi is an Indian wildlife conservationist and wildlife rehabilitationist from Assam. He has rescued over 5000 Animals in Kaziranga National Park, a national park in the Golaghat, Karbi Anglong and Nagaon districts of the state of Assam, India. He is widely known for saving desperate animals from the annual Assam floods.

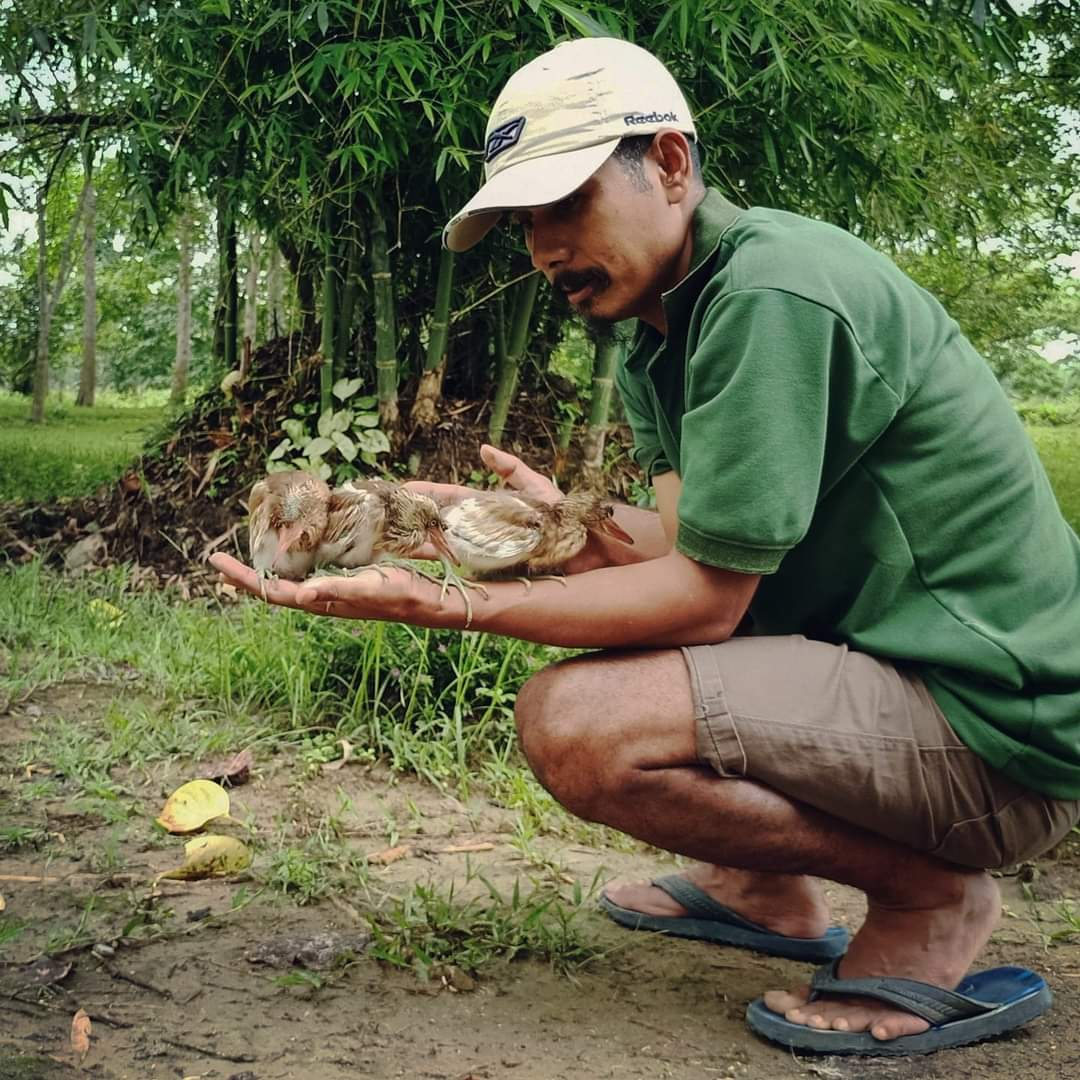
Gogoi with Indian Pond Heron

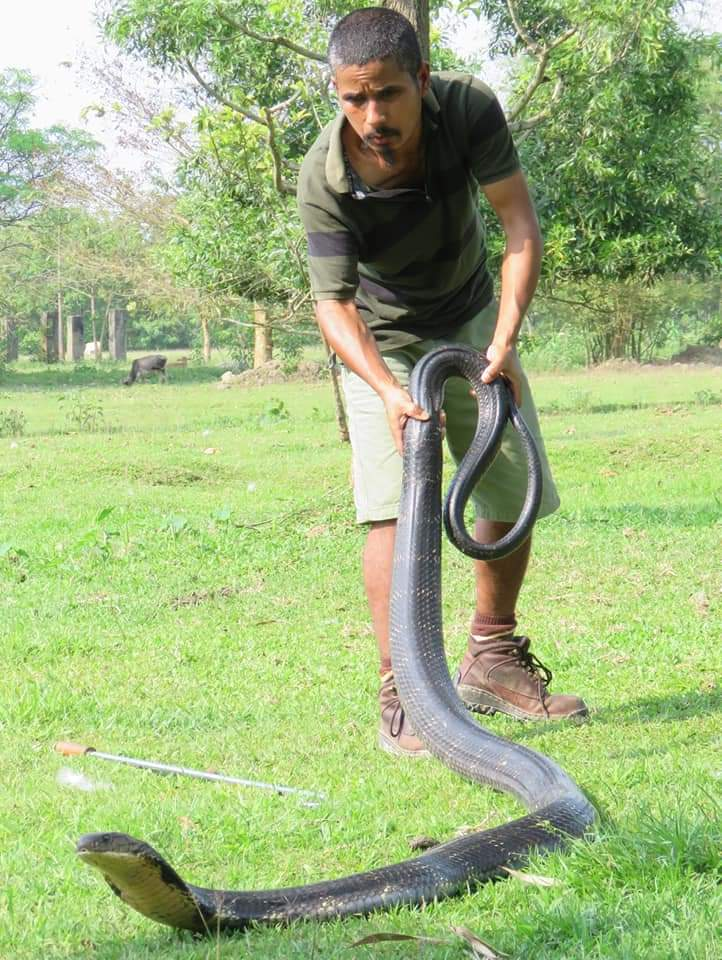
Gogoi with a King cobra

== Early life and education ==
Gogoi was born in Bochagaon village of Kaziranga to Junaram and Rupa Gogoi on 4 January 1975. He completed his high school leaving certificate examination from Kohora National Park High School in the year 1992. He dropped out of higher secondary school in order to pursue his passion. During initial days, he started working as a gypsy driver-cum-tourist guide ferrying tourists inside the Kaziranga National Park.

== Personal life ==
He is married to Kashmiri Saikia Gogoi. He tied the knot with Kashmiri in 2005.

== Wildlife conservation works ==
Gogoi is a keen bird watcher and a naturalist. He grew up in the lap of nature teeming with various birds, rhinoceros, leopards, and snakes, even venomous ones. After working as a gypsy driver-cum-tourist guide ferrying tourists till 2013, Gogoi decided to become a full-fledged environmentalist after a chance meeting with Kedar Gore, director of Corbett Foundation.

Gogoi was a part of a television documentary filmed by wildlife film maker Vijay Bedi, which was aired on Animal Planet and Discovery Channel. The Corbett Foundation awarded him with the title ‘Wildlife Warrior’ in 2014.

== Award ==
Gogoi receives India Star Passion Award 2019 for his social service (environment).
