= Sushila Hazarika =

Indian politician

Sushila Hazarika is a Bharatiya Janata Party politician from Assam, India. She was elected in Assam Legislative Assembly election in 1996 and 2006 from Dergaon constituency.
