= Negheriting Shiva Doul =

Hindu temple in India

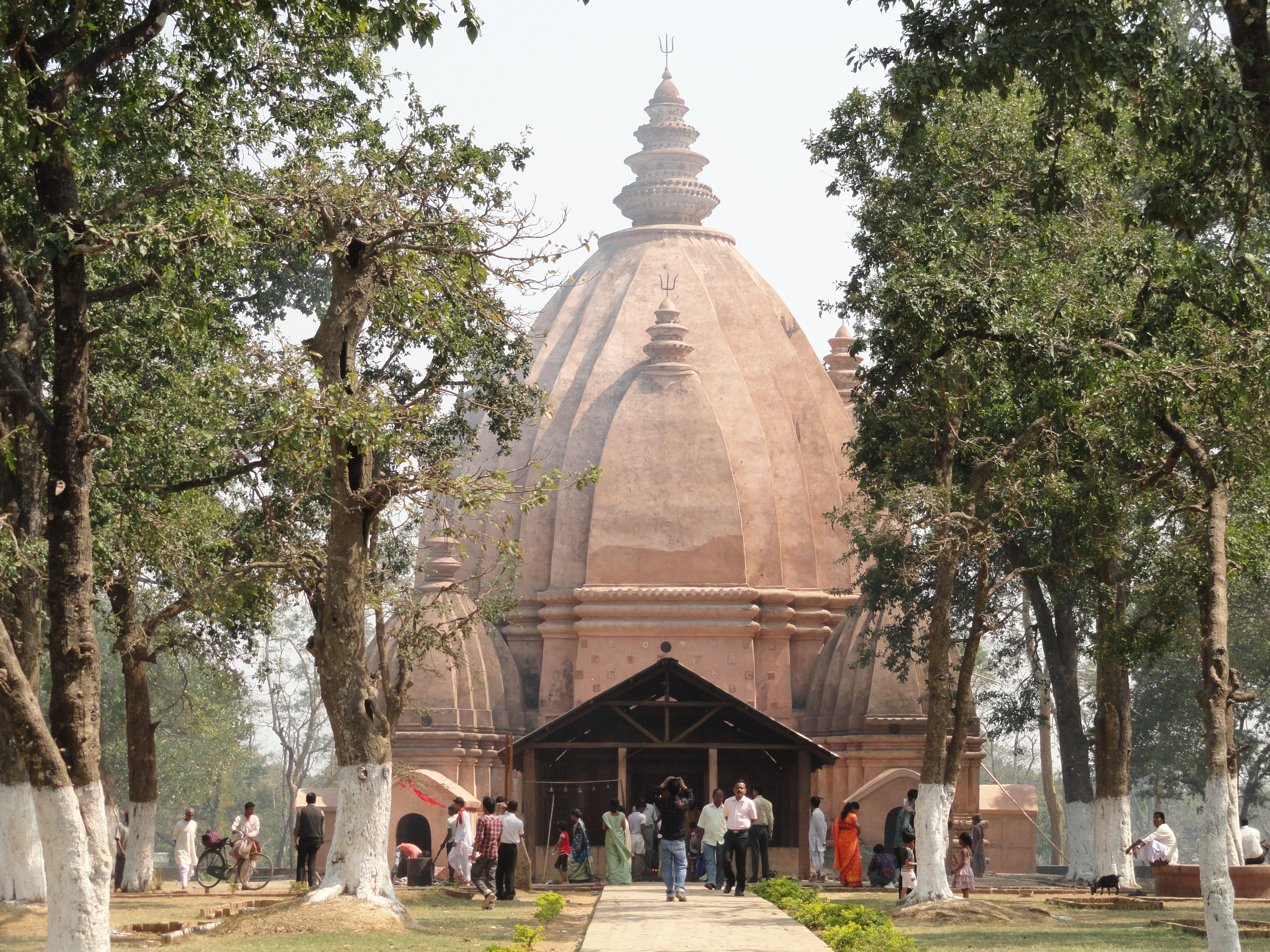

Religion
- Affiliation: Hinduism
- Deity: Shiva

Location
- Location: Dergaon
- State: Assam
- Country: India
- Interactive map of Negheriting Shiva Doul

Architecture
- Creator: Rajeswar Singha
- Established: 1765; 261 years ago

The Negheriting Shiva Doul is a Shiva temple at Dergaon in Assam, India. Situated on a hillock at about one and half km north from the National Highway 37 in the Golaghat district of Assam. This is a national protected monument. Later due to natural calamities it came into destruction. The older Negheriting temple is mentioned in Buranjis in relation to wars with the Kachari kingdom of early 16th century. The region around Dergaon, where the temple is located, was then part of the Kachari domain, before being annexed by the Ahoms during the reign of Suhungmung. In 1765, a brick temple was constructed by Ahom king Swargadeo Rajeswar Singha in place of the older stone temple. The famous architect assigned to the job was Ghanashyam Khonikar.

== History ==
It is believed that the stones used to construct the temple existed in the bank of river Dihing. Due to natural calamities the temple was destroyed and the remains were found in deep forest called Gajapanemara. However, as the Dihing river changed the course, the temple was again destroyed and merged into the river water. A devotee of lord Shiva found the ruined temple and the linga in the shallow water of river Dihing, now this place is known as Sheetal Negheri. Ahom king Rajeswar Singha (1751–1769) brought the linga from the river and reconstructed the present temple and established the Shivalinga in it.

== Architecture ==
The main temple is surrounded by four other temples namely the Vishnu, Ganesha, Surya and Durga temple. This is a Panchayatana temple consisting of the main shrine with the main tower surrounded by four subsidiary shrines at the four corners dedicated to Devi Durga, Ganesha, Surya and Vishnu, which is an example of Panchayatana cult under one foof. A Banalinga of three feet in diameter is established in the main temple. According to legend a Rishi named Urba wanted to establish a second Kashi right on this place for which he collected many Shiva lingas there.

== The name ==
The place where the temple is located was once the habitat of a peculiar bird locally known as Negheri. From this name the place has come to be known as Negheriting.

== Maintenance ==
A priest named Bhudhar Agamacharji was appointed by king Rajeswar Singha for proper maintenance of the temple and also for the rituals to be performed. The Agamacharji family still performs worship and other maintenance works regularly. Customs of performing songs and dances called Deonati were prominent there in the temple.

== The Monkeys ==
One of the attractions of the temple is the monkeys. The temple is the house of the rhesus monkeys where a sizeable population of this species is there.

== Photo gallery ==
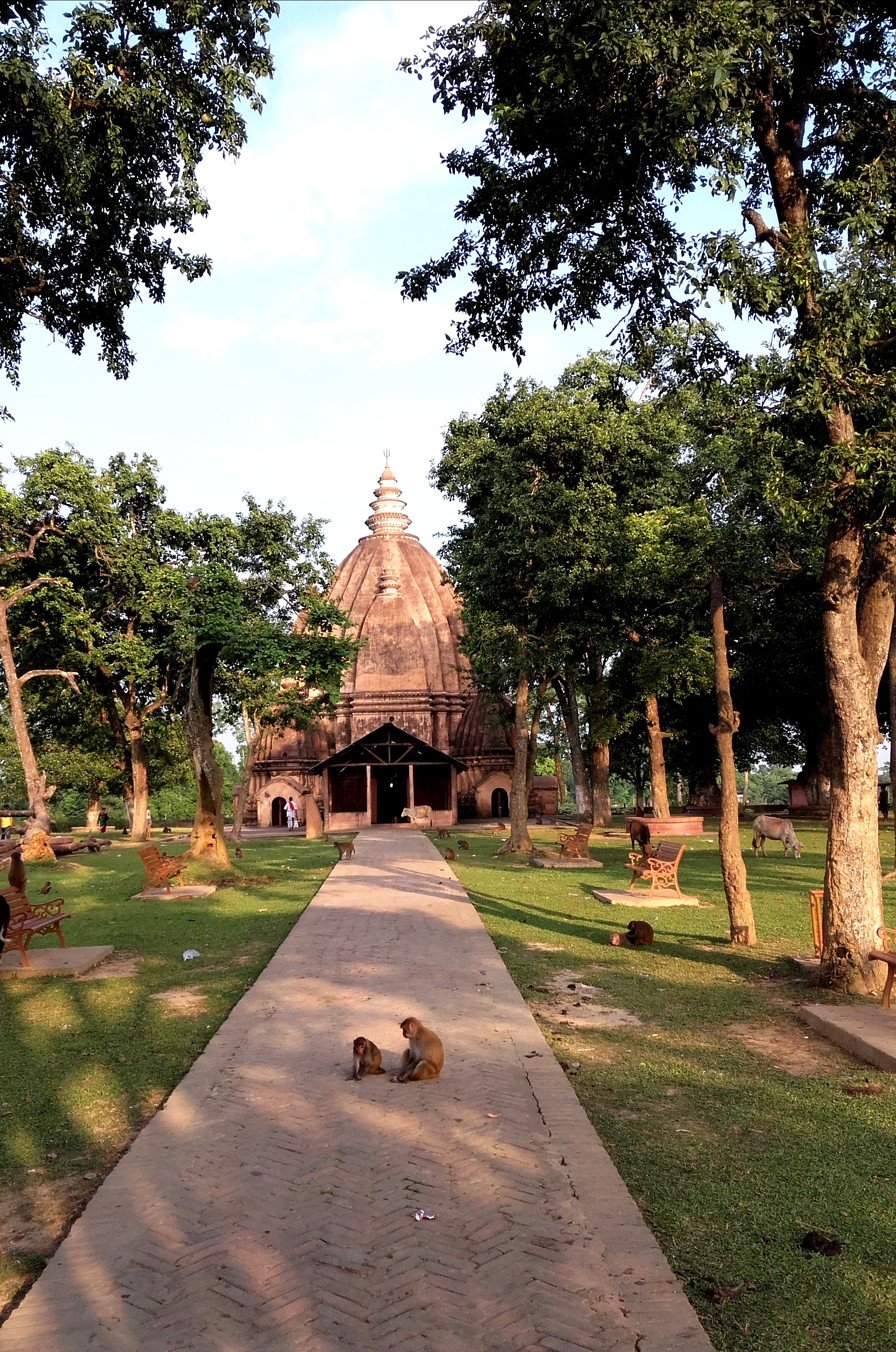
SRI SRI NEGHERITING SIVADOL

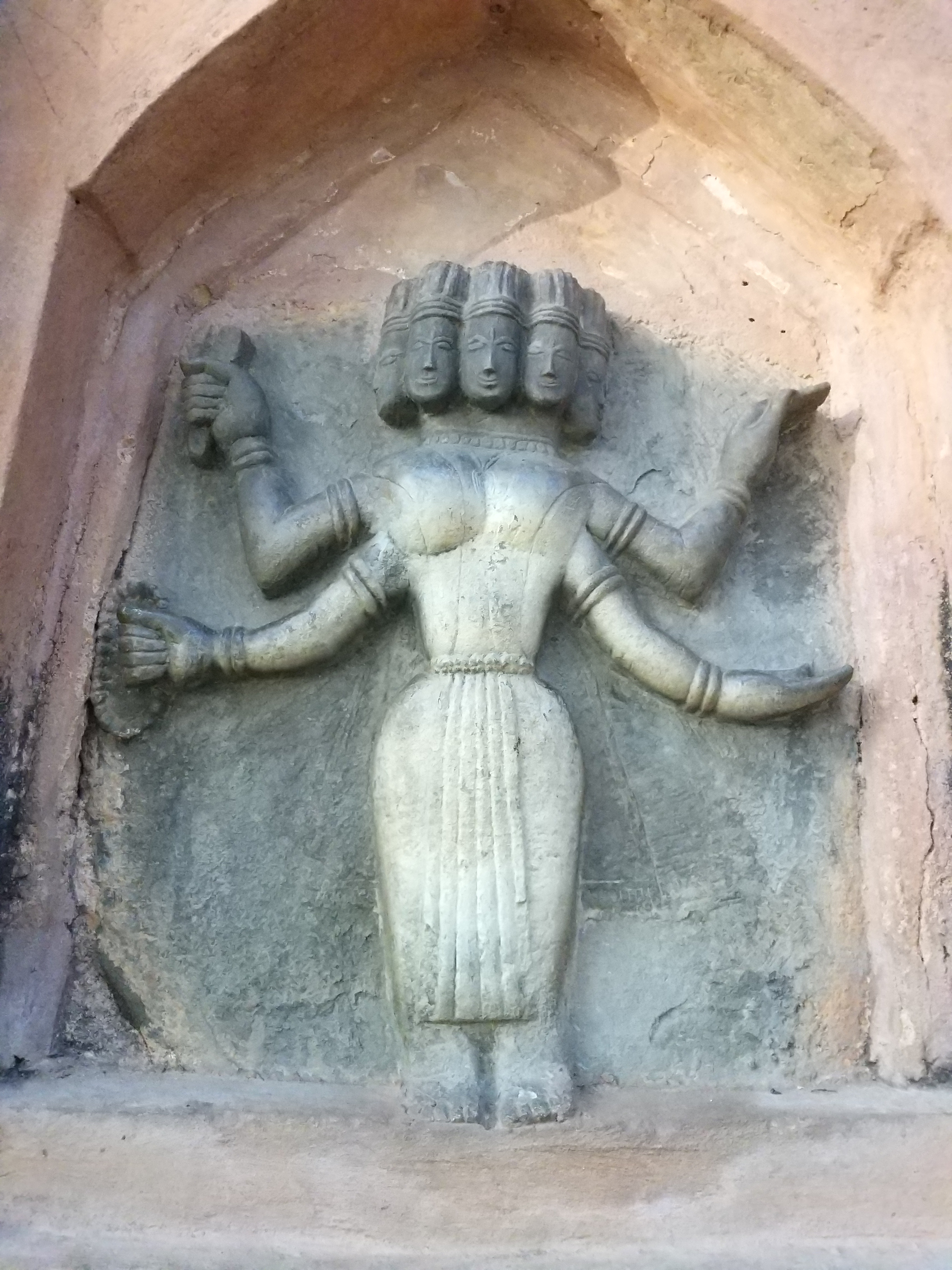
Negheriting Sivadol Sculpture

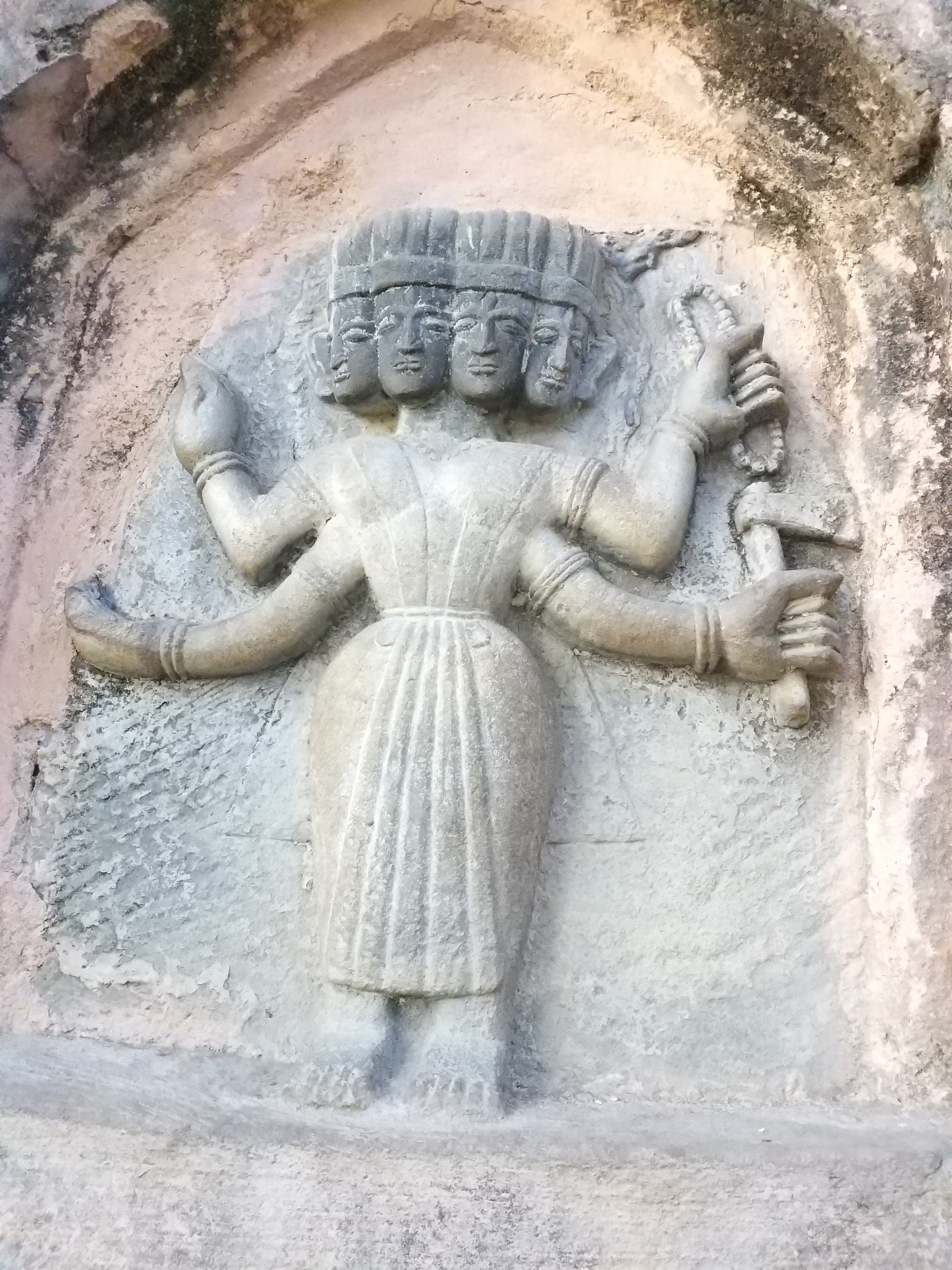
Negheriting Sivadol sculpture

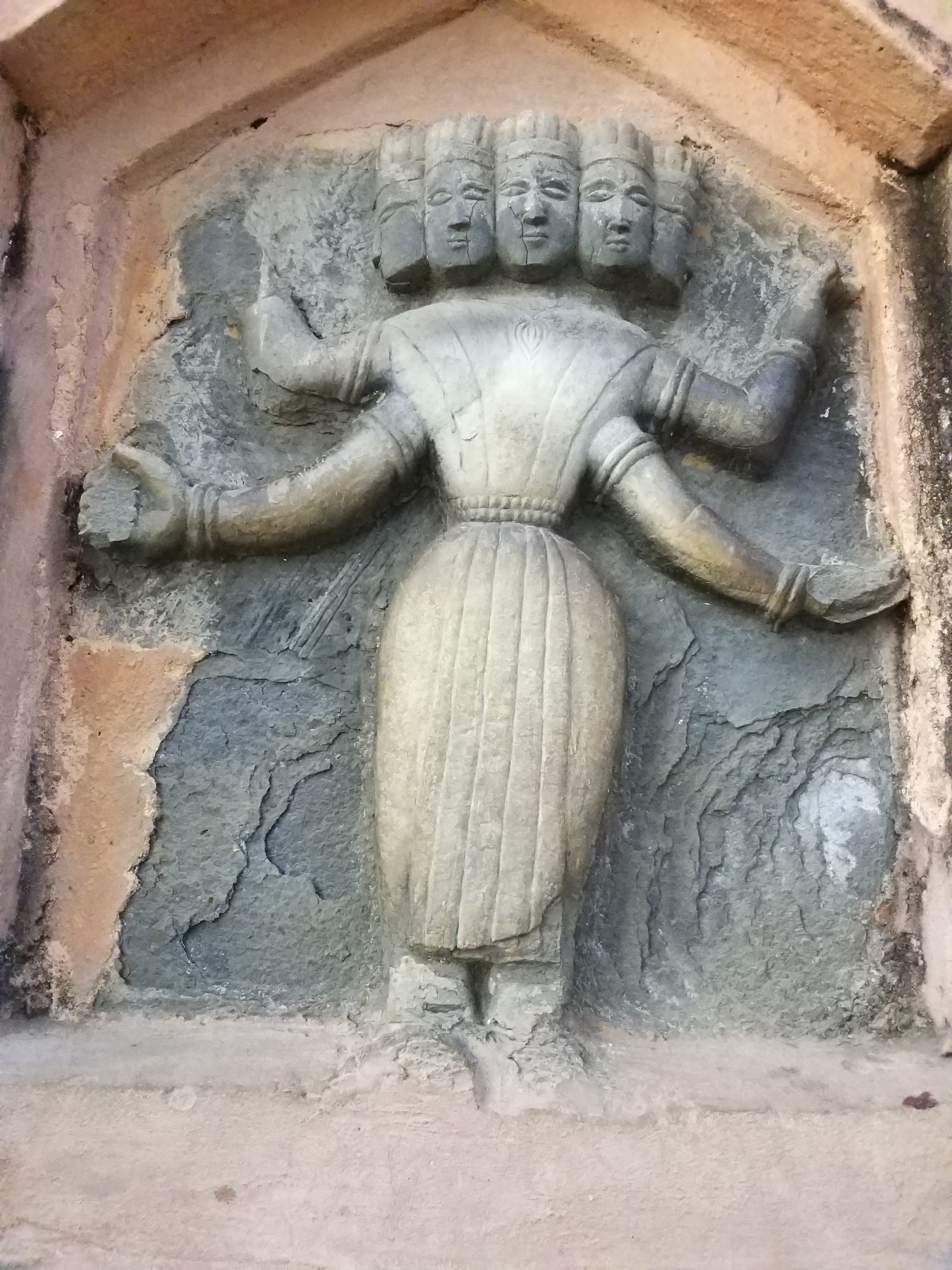
Negheriting Sivadol sculpture

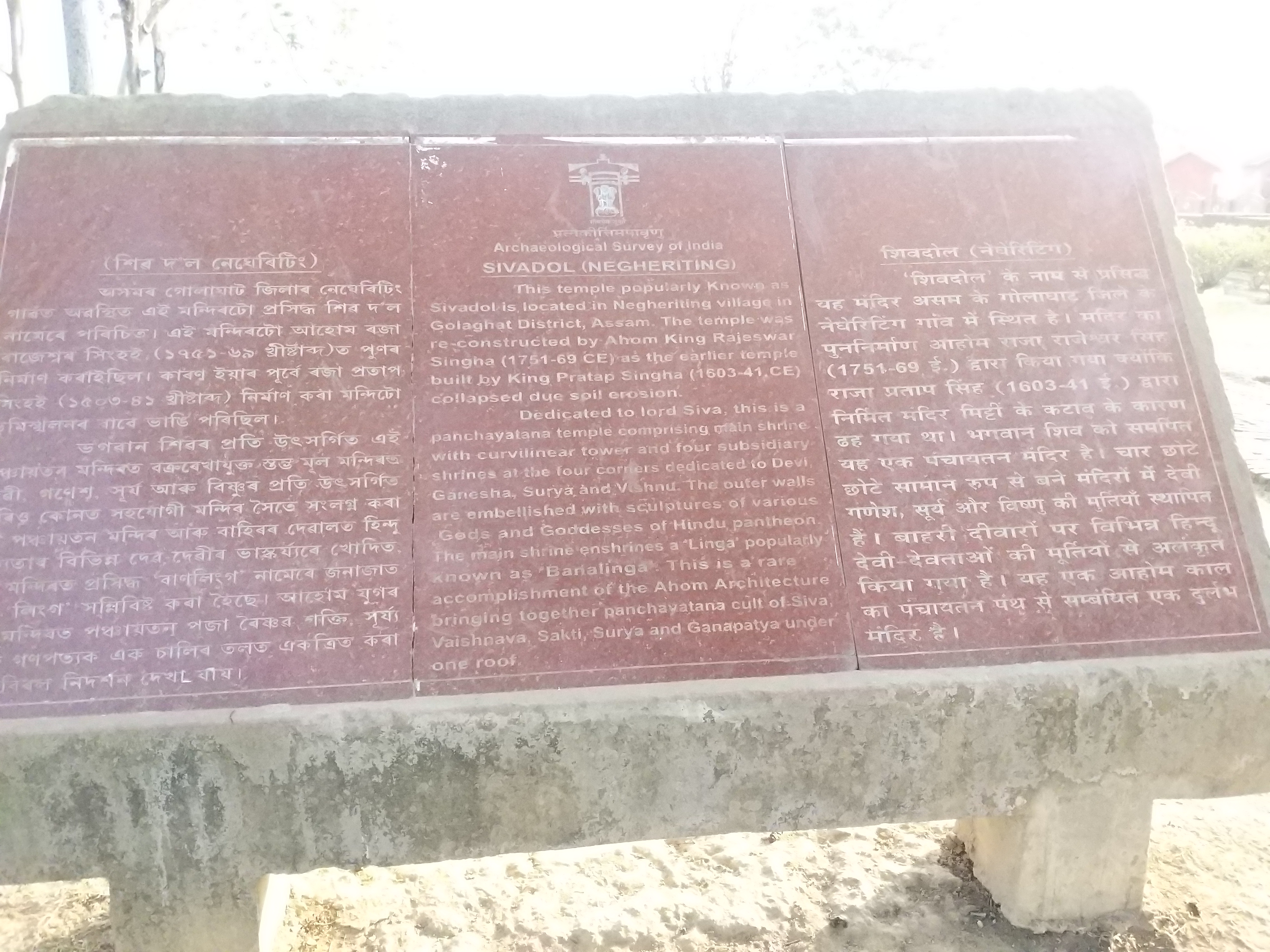
Negheriting Sivadol ASI information plaque

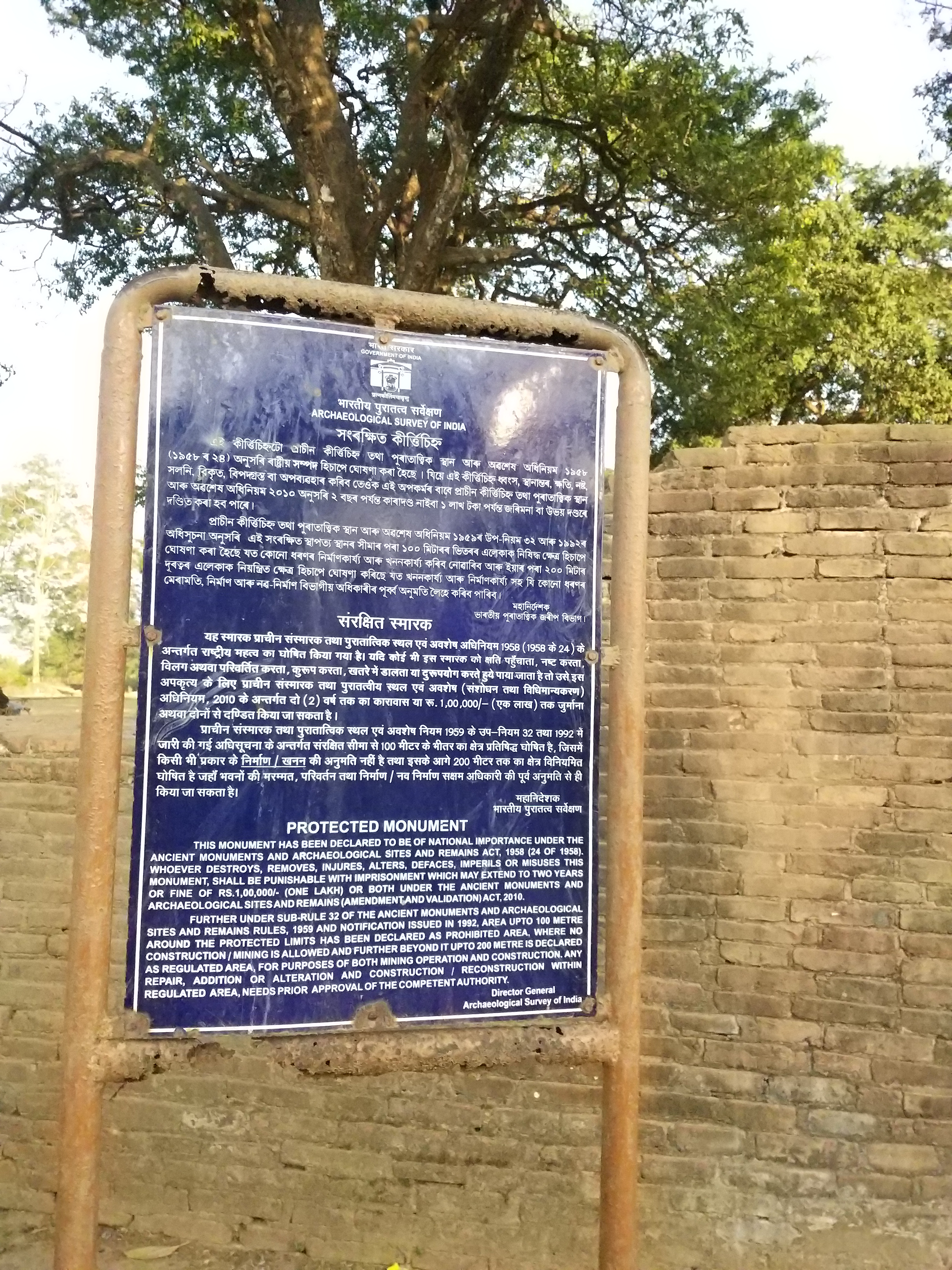
Negheriting Sivadol ASI protected monument board
