= Bhabendra Nath Bharali =

Indian politician

Bhabendra Nath Bharali is an Asom Gana Parishad politician from Assam. He was elected to the Assam Legislative Assembly in the 2016 election from Dergaon constituency.
