= Hemchandra Barua =

Indian writer and social reformer

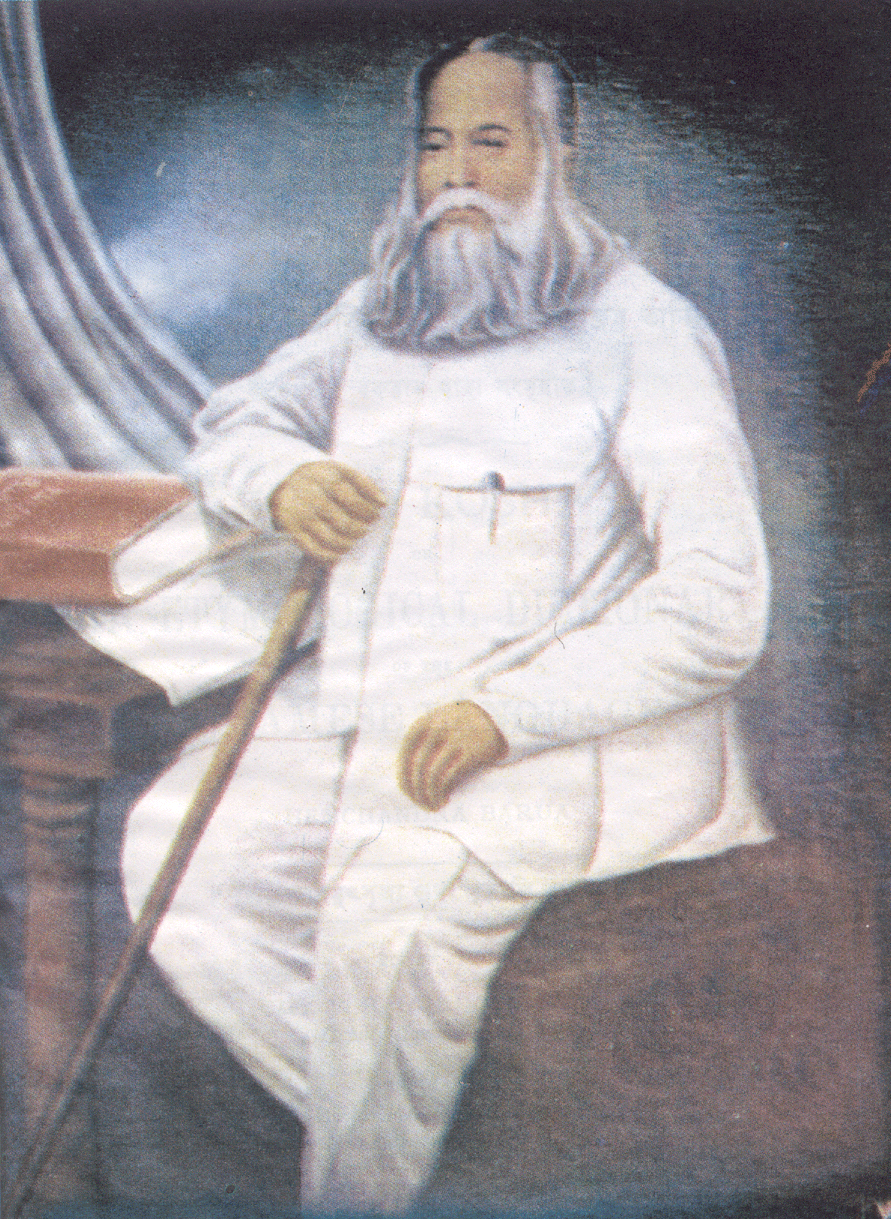
- Born: 10 December 1835; Dergaon, Assam
- Died: 1897 (aged 61–62)
- Writing career
- Language: Assamese
- Notable work: Hemkosh

Hemchandra Barua (Hêmsôndrô Bôruwa), also known as Hem Barua, was a prominent writer, social reformer of Assamese of the 19th century. He hailed from Dergaon, Golaghat district of Assam. Barua was known by pseudonym Bhaxar Oja for his immense contributions towards foundation of modern Assamese language.

== Early life ==
Barua was born on 10 December 1835 to Muktaram Barua and Rupohi Devi at Rajabahar village of Dergaon in undivided Sibsagar district. He was oldest among his siblings.

== Literacy works ==
He was the compiler of the first exhaustive Assamese dictionary Hemkosh, where spellings based on Sanskrit were first introduced. It was the second dictionary of the Assamese language. It was published in 1900 after his death under the supervision of Capt. P. R. Gordon, ISC and Hemchandra Goswami.

Some of his other works are listed below:

- 'Ôxômiya Byakôrôn' (Assamese grammar) (অসমীয়া ব্যাকৰণ) (1859)
- 'Adipath' (আদিপাঠ) (1873)
- 'Pathmala' (পাঠ-মালা) (1882)
- 'Ôxômiya lôrar byakôrôn' (Grammar for Assamese children) (অসমীয়া ল’ৰাৰ ব্যাকৰণ) (1886). All the above four books were accepted as text books for schools and also awarded by the British Government.
- 'Pôrhaxôliya Ôbhidhan' (School Dictionary) (পঢ়াশলীয়া অভিধান) (1892)
- 'Bahirê rông sông, bhitôrê kûwabhaturi', (বাহিৰে ৰংচং ভিতৰে কোৱাভাতুৰী)
- 'Kaniyar Kirttôn' (কানীয়াৰ কীৰ্ত্তন) (1861)
- 'Swasthyô rôkhya ba ga bhalê rakhibôr upay' (Way to health) (স্বাস্থ্য ৰক্ষা বা গা ভালে ৰাখিবৰ উপায়) (translated)
- 'Assamese Marriage System'

He was also an editor of Assam News published from Gauhati (1883–85).

== See also ==
- Assamese Language Movement
- Orunodoi
