= Kushal Konwar =

Main freedom fighter

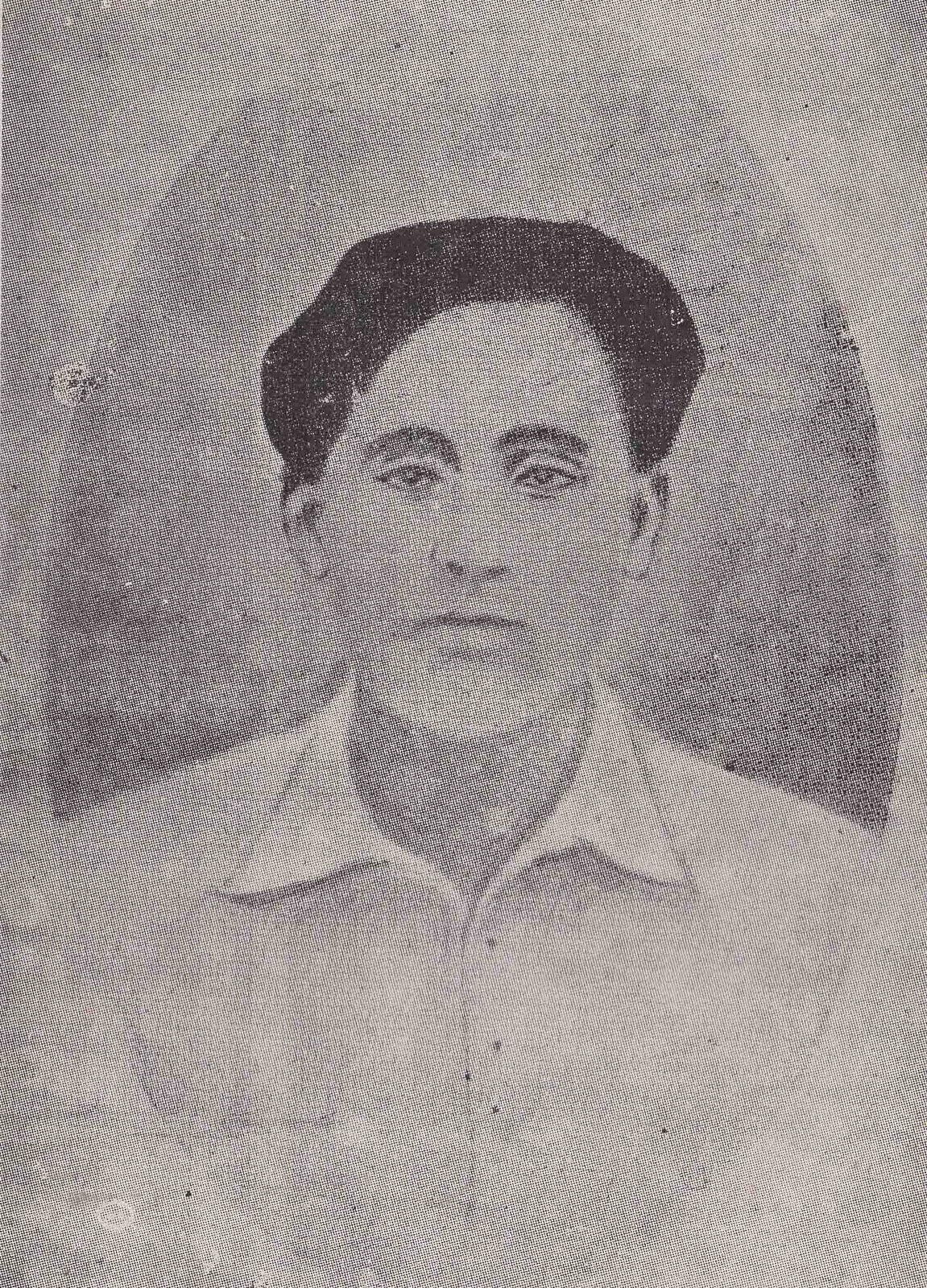
- Born: 21 March 1905; Chaodang Chariali, Ghiladhari Mouza, Golaghat, Assam, India
- Died: 15 June 1943 (aged 38); Jorhat, Assam, India
- Years active: 1920-1942
- Known for: Freedom Fighter
- Political party: Indian National Congress
- Criminal charges: conspiracy and train sabotage against the British Government

Kushal Konwar (1905 - 1943) was an Indian freedom fighter from Assam. He was hanged in 1942 during the Quit India Movement.

== Early life, education and work ==
Kushal Konwar was born on 21 March 1905 at Chaodang Chariali of Ghiladhari Mouza, Golaghat district (then part of Shivsagar district) of Assam. Kushal Konwar attended the Bezbaruah School.

In 1921, while still at school, he was inspired by Gandhiji’s call for a non-cooperation movement and took an active part in it. Inspired by Gandhiji’s ideals of Swaraj, Truth and Ahimsa, Konwar set up a primary school at Bengmai and served as its honorary teacher. Later, he joined the Balijan Tea Estate as a clerk, where he worked for a while.

However, the spirit of independence and call of Mahatma Gandhi inspired him to dedicate himself wholeheartedly to the Independence Movement. He organised the Congress party and led the people of the Sarupathar area in Satyagraha and the non-cooperation movement against the British. He was elected the President of the Sarupathar Congress Committee.

At dawn on 15 June 1943 at 4:30 am, Kushal Konwar was hanged in Jorhat Jail. He sacrificed his life knowing as Mahatma said: "He alone can be a true satyagrahi who knows the art of living and dying."

== Quit India Movement ==
On 8 August 1942, the Congress Working Committee in its meeting in Bombay passed the "Quit India" resolution. This resolution demanded complete withdrawal of the British from the India’s soil. Mahatma Gandhi gave the call of "do or die" to the people of India. The British reacted by arresting Mahatma and all the Congress leaders and putting them in jail. Across India, this sparked a widespread mass movement against the British. Cutting across caste, creed, and religion, people came out to the streets shouting the slogan of "Vande Mataram". In spite of Gandhiji’s appeal for peaceful non-cooperation and dharna, in many regions the movement erupted in violence, with people burning offices and damaging government properties, disrupting road and telecommunication networks.

Some people of Assam also spontaneously joined this historic movement of 1942. Two of the leaders of the Assam Pradesh Congress, Gopinath Bordoloi and Siddhinath Sarma, were arrested by the British in Dhubri while returning from Bombay after attending the Congress Working Committee meeting. Other Congress leaders such as Bishnuram Medhi, Bimala Prasad Chaliha, Md. Tayebulla, Omeo Kumar Das, Debeswar Sarma, etc., were arrested from different parts of Assam and thrown into jails. Assam too burned like the rest of India, and many people leaving the path of nonviolence engaged in violence.

On 10 October 1942, hidden in the thick fog of early morning, Indian independence activists removed sleepers from a railway line near Sarupathar in Golaghat district. A military train passing by derailed, and over a thousand Allied soldiers were killed. The police immediately cordoned the area and started an operation to catch the culprits. The district magistrate of Jorhat, C.A. Humphrey, issued arrest warrants to all Indian National Congress members in the immediate area.

Accusing Kushal Konwar as the chief conspirator of the train sabotage, the police arrested him. An ardent follower of Gandhiji and his principle of nonviolence, Kushal was ignorant of the sabotage plan and action. He was innocent, but the police charged him as the mastermind of the train sabotage. He was brought from Golaghat and was lodged in the Jorhat jail on 5 November 1942.

In the Court of CM Humphrey, Kushal Konwar was declared guilty, though there was not a single piece of evidence against him. Kushal was sentenced to death by hanging. He accepted the verdict with dignity. When his wife, Prabhavati, visited him in the Jorhat jail, he told her that he was proud that God had selected him to be the only one among the thousands of prisoners to give the supreme sacrifice for the country. Kushal spent his remaining days in the death row cell of Jorhat jail in prayers and reading the Gita.

== Martyrdom ==
At dawn on 15 June 1943 at 4:30 am, Kushal Konwar was hanged in Jorhat Jail. He sacrificed his life knowing, as Mahatma said: "He alone can be a true [satyagrahi] who knows the art of living and dying."

== Family ==
Kushal Konwar married Prabhawati while young and had two sons, Khagen and Nagen. Both sons have died. His late elder son Khagen Konwar had a wife, five sons and five daughters who are still alive. The late Nagen Konwar's wife and two sons are also still alive and live in Guwahati.
