= Hemkosh =

Dictionary first published in 1900

Hemkosh হেমকোষ
- Author: Hemchandra Barua
- Illustrator: Hemchandra Barua
- Language: Assamese
- Subject: Dictionary
- Publisher: Hemkosh Printers
- Publication date: 1900
- Publication place: India
- Media type: Print (Hardcover and Paperback)

Hemkosh (Assamese: হেমকোষ, IPA: [hɛmkʊx]) is the first etymological dictionary of the Assamese language based on Sanskrit spellings, compiled by Hemchandra Barua. It was first published in the early 20th century under the supervision of Capt. P. R. Gordon, ISC and Hemchandra Goswami, 33 years after the publication of Bronson's dictionary. It contained about 22,346 words. This dictionary still published by Hemkosh Printers is considered to be the "standard" reference of the Assamese orthography.

Hemkosh is the second dictionary of Assamese language. The first Assamese dictionary was compiled by Dr. Miles Bronson, an American Baptist Missionary. His dictionary, published in 1867 at the American Baptist Mission Press, Sibsagar, is out of print. Bronson's work did not pretend to be an etymological dictionary but contained a very considerable collection of words from the people themselves without recording derivations.
