= Golaghat district =

- District of Assam
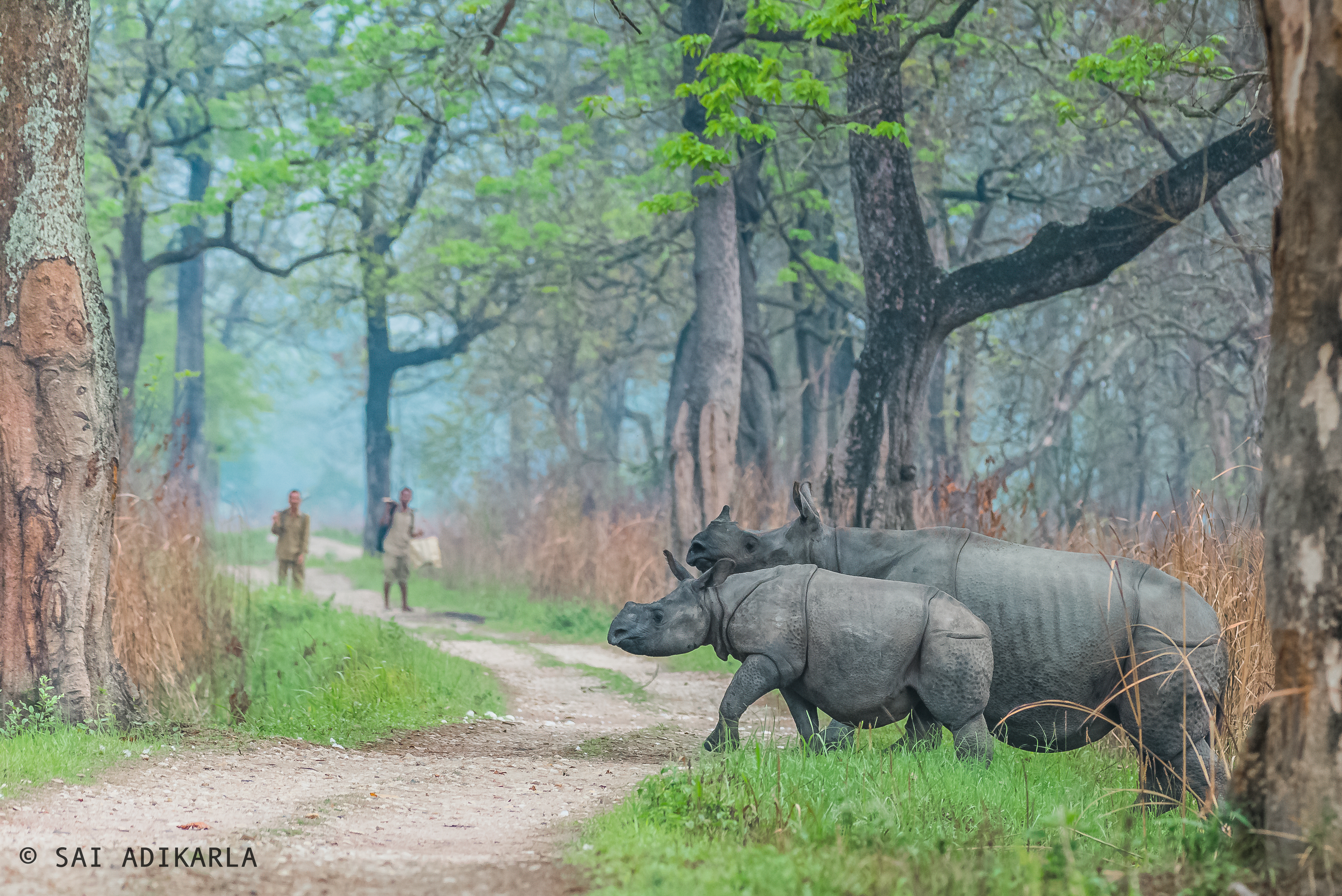
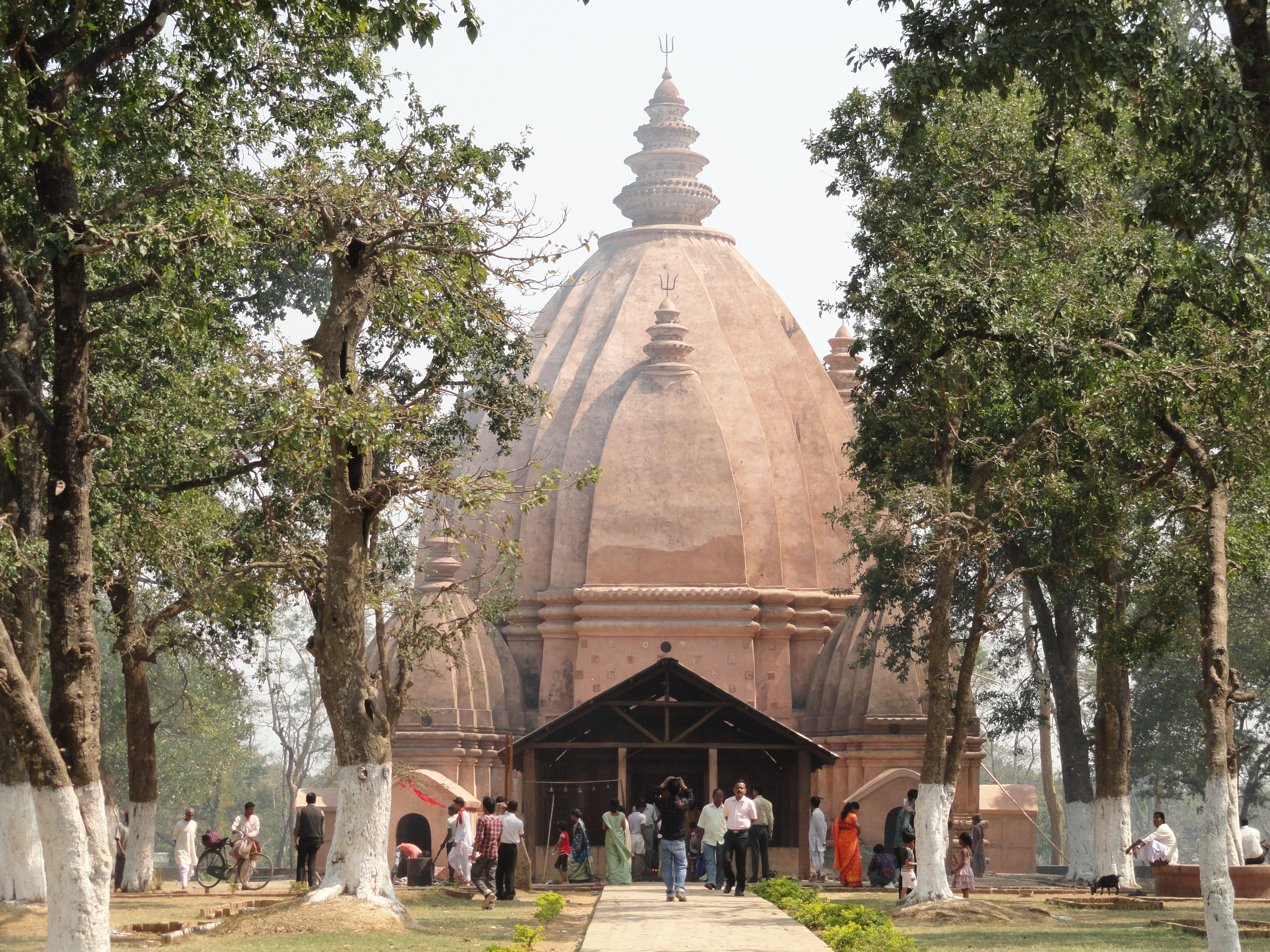
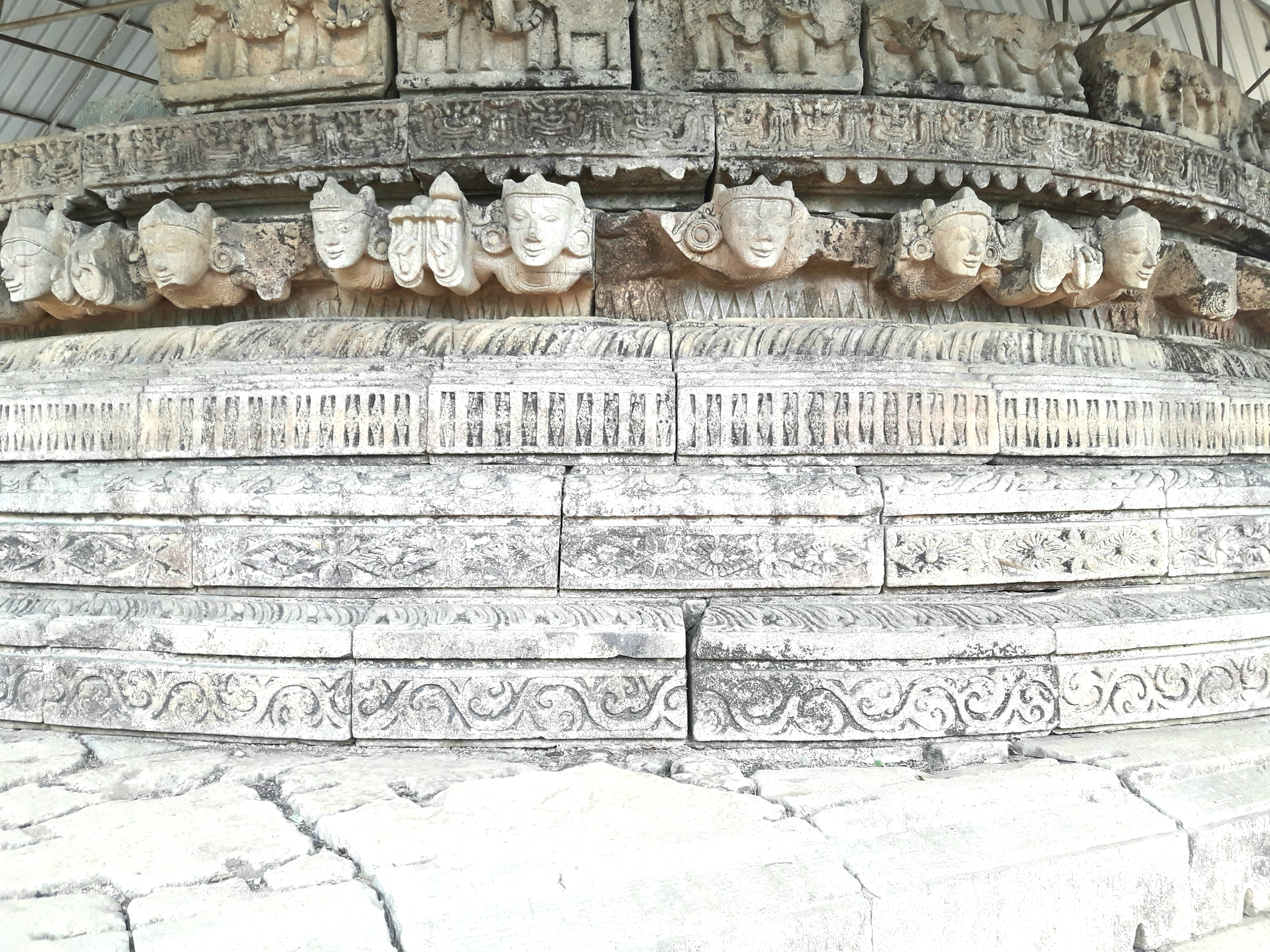
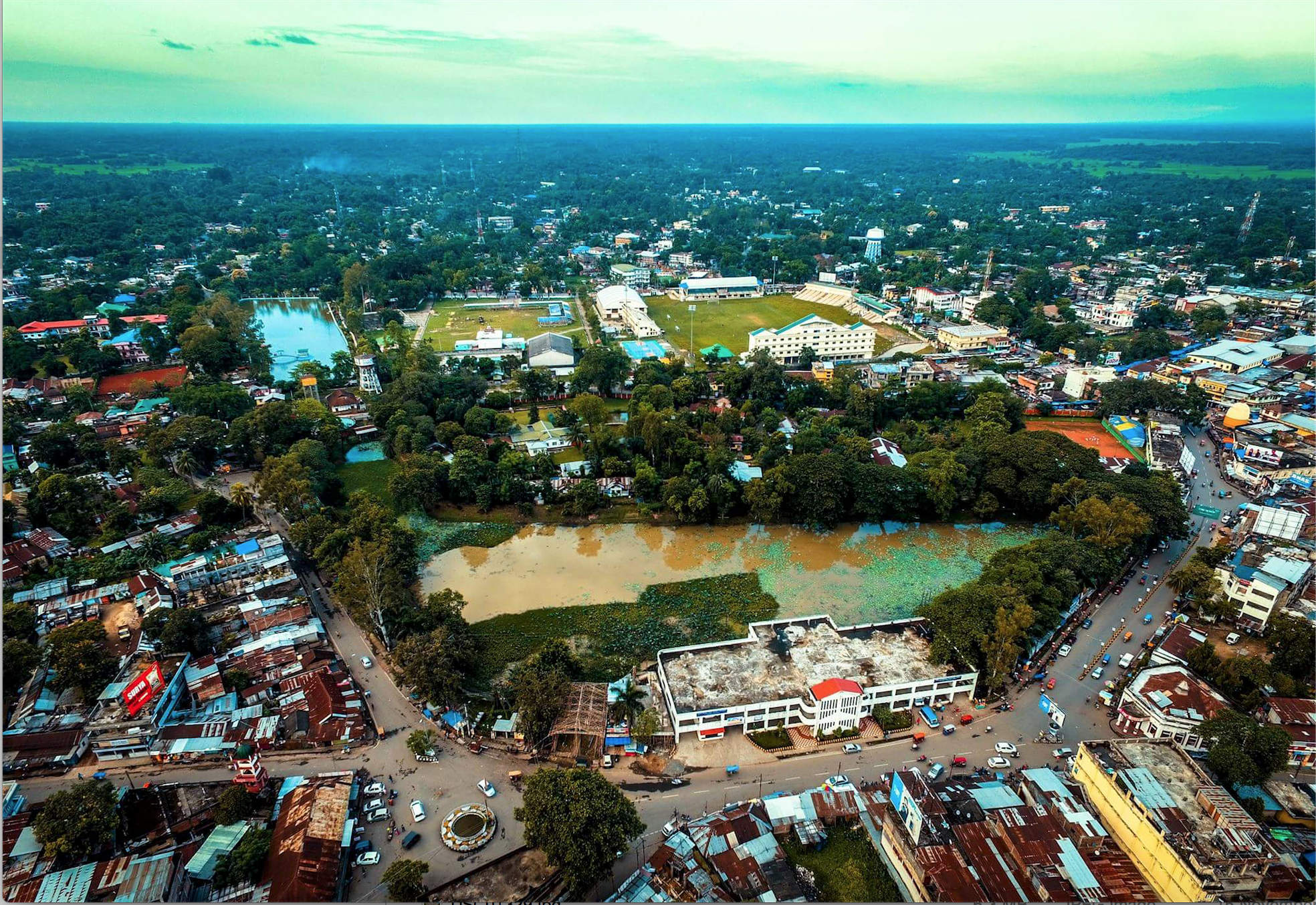
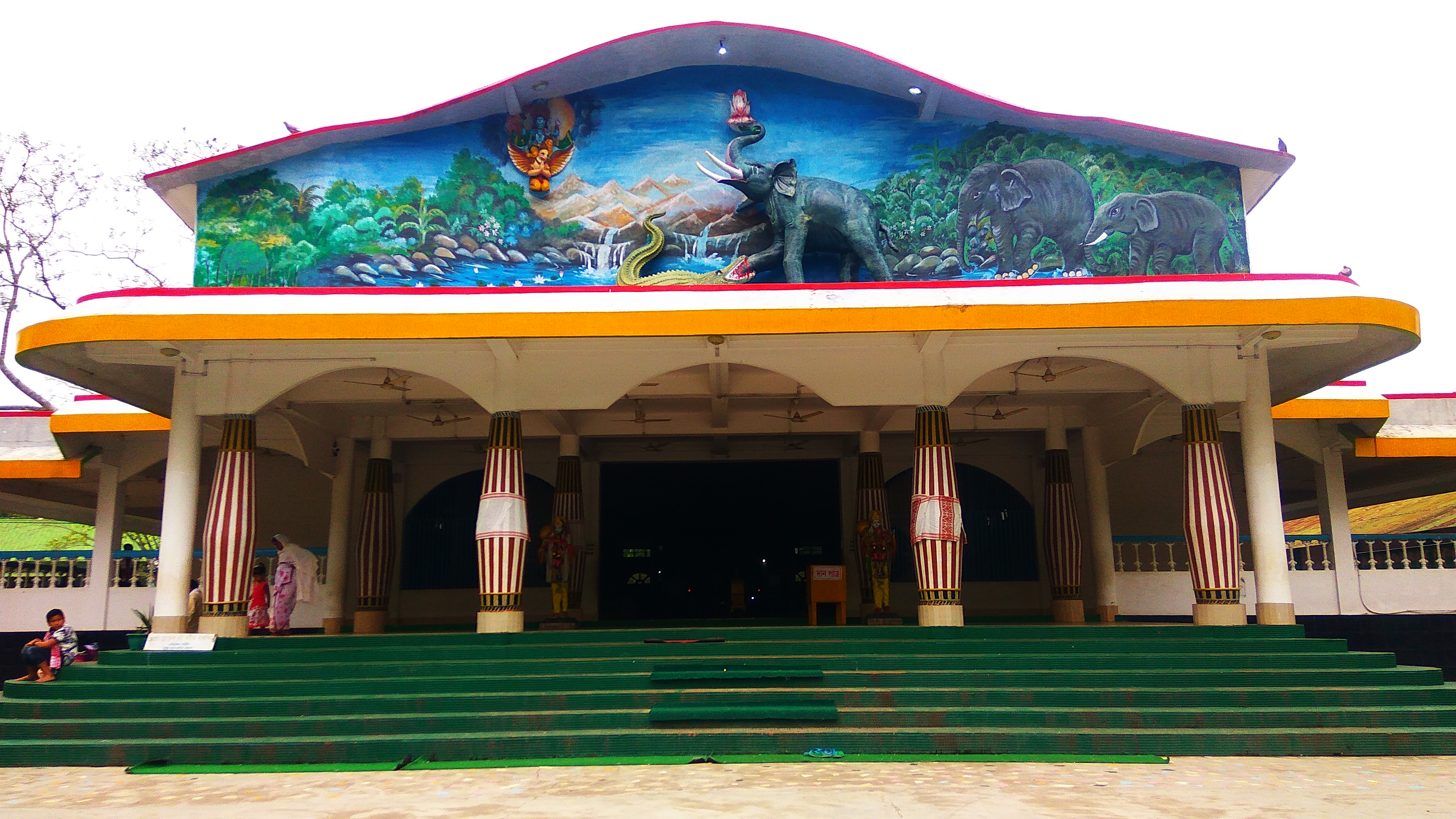
- From top, left-to-right: Rhinoceros in Kaziranga National Park, Negheriting Shiva Doul, Deopahar, Golaghat city view, Athkheliya Namghar.

- Location in Assam
- Coordinates: 26.0°N 93.0°E
- Country: India
- State: Assam
- Division: Upper Assam
- Headquarters: Golaghat

Government
  - Lok Sabha constituencies: Kaliabor
  - Vidhan Sabha constituencies: Bokakhat, Sarupathar, Golaghat, Khumtai, Dergaon,

Area
  - Total: 3,502 km^{2} (1,352 sq mi)

Population (2011)
  - Total: 1,066,888
  - Density: 304.7/km^{2} (789.0/sq mi)
- Time zone: UTC+05:30 (IST)
- Website: golaghat.assam.gov.in

Golaghat district (/ˌɡəʊləˈɡɑːt/) is an administrative district in the state of Assam in India. It attained district status in 1987. The district headquarters are located at Golaghat. The district occupies an area of3,502 km^{2} (1,352 sq mi) and lies 100 metres (330 ft) above sea level.

== Etymology ==
The name 'Golaghat' originated from the markets established by a business class of people called Marwari during the mid-19th century at the bank of the river Dhansiri in the vicinity of the district headquarters. "Gola" means market and "Ghat" means a river port .

== History ==
=== 9th century ===
The Nagajari-Khanikargaon rock inscription of Nagajari Khanikar village of Sarupathar, remnants of fortifications, brick structures, monuments, temples, tanks, etc. are evidence of a 9th-century kingdom in the Doyang-Dhansiri valley.

=== With Ming dynasty and Kingdom of Ava ===
Earlier, this part was ruled by the Dimasa Kingdom. The Ming dynasty had contact with the Dimasas and canonised the Dimasa kingdom as a tusi in 1406. The Ming court sent Zhou Rang, a Supervising Secretary to bestow Imperial orders, patent, seals, paper money, silks etc. to the kingdom and in return, the chieftain of Dimasa sent horses and local products as a sign of tribute. In 1425, paper money, ramie-silks, silk gauzes and thin silk were conferred to Mazhiasa who was sent to the Ming court by Diedaomangpa, the acting head of Di-ma-sa Pacification Superintendency.

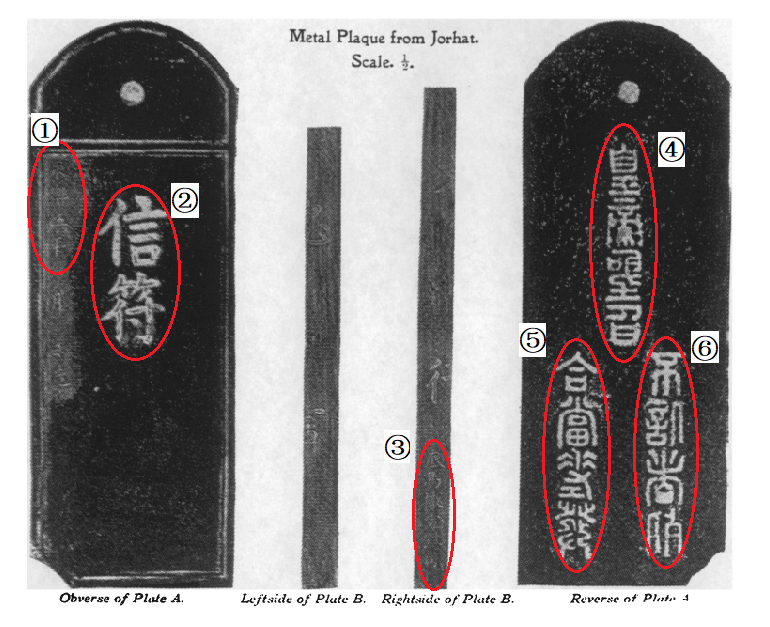
Chinese plate for Dimasa of the era of Emperor Yong-le (1407 AD.) (Note: Plate was discovered in Jorhat Assam from Ahom royal family. ① 永樂五年: Yong-le emperor 5 years: 1407 AD. ② 信符: Plate. ③ 底馬撒宣慰司: Di-ma-sa Xuanwei Si ④ 皇帝聖旨: Imperial edict ⑤ 合當差發: "合當" means must or should, "差發" is a commercial form in the early Ming dynasty that frontier ethnic groups or tribes exchange horses for tea with Ming officials. "合當差發" could be understood as if you have this plate then you can exchange horses for tea with a Ming official. The Ming dynasty prohibits the folk tea trade with frontier ethnics and tribes. "合當差發" is the only way they can get tea from Ming. ⑥ 不信者斬: If somebody does not comply, he should be killed.)

It is speculated that Dimasa kingdom is referred to as Timmasala in the Yan-anng-myin pagoda inscription of Burma in 1400 A.D. In this inscription by Minkhaung I, the kingdom of Ava is said to extend on the east to Shan Pyi, northwest to Timmasala, west to Kula Pyi, and south to Talaing Pyi.

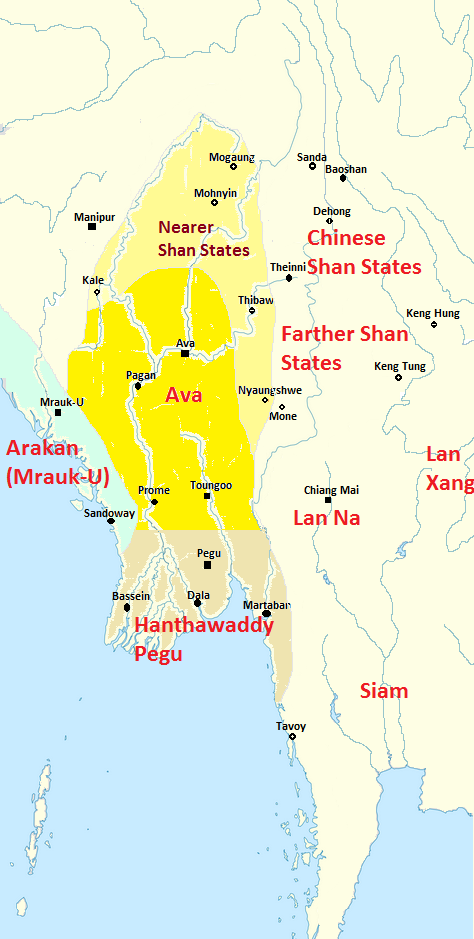
Ava in 1400s

In a 1442 inscription from Pagan of Burma mentions Timmasala (Hill Kacharis) to be one of the 21 principalities under Mong Mao ruler Thonganbwa (1413–1445/6), who was later captured by the Governor of Taungdwin and presented to King Narapati I of Ava.

=== Under Ahoms ===
The Ahoms became the rulers of the Doyang-Dhansiri valley in the 16th century. The Kacharis were pushed back towards west of the Karbi hills. The Ahom King Suhungmung (1497–1539), appointed a ruler entitled Marangi-Khowa Gohain, an administrative post with the Rank of a Governor/Minister of the Ahom administration. Under Marangi-khowa Gohain, large number of people from different parts of Ahom kingdom were settled in erstwhile Kachari Kingdom. An interesting aspect of such settlement was that a large number of people from different castes/communities were mixed up together so that there was remote chance of rebellion in such newly acquired territory. Most of the Morongi-Khowa Gohains were appointed from the Burhagohain families although there were few exceptions.

Later, when the British took control of Assam, the Doyang-Dhansiri valley was incorporated under the newly formed Golaghat subdivision of the Sibsagar district in 1846. Golaghat district played an active part in the freedom struggle of India. Kushal Konwar, Kamala Miri, Dwariki Das, Biju Vaishnav, Sankar Chandra Barua, Shri Tara Prasad Barooah, Rajendra Nath Barua, Gaurilal Jain, Ganga Ram Bormedhi and Dwarikanath Goswami are eminent freedom fighters of the region.

Golaghat was raised to the position of a district of Assam on 15 August 1987, when it was split from Sibsagar district.

== Geography ==
Golaghat district occupies an area of 3,502 square kilometres (1,352 sq mi), comparatively equivalent to the Bahamas' North Andros Island.

=== Location ===
Golaghat district is surrounded by the river Brahmaputra to the north, the state of Nagaland to the south, Jorhat district to the east and Karbi Anglong and Nagaon district to the west. Dhansiri is the principal river, which originates from Laisang peak of Nagaland. It streams through a distance of 352 km from south to north before joining the Brahmaputra. Its catchment area is 1,220 km^{2} (470 sq mi). Doyang, Nambor, Doigrung and Kalioni are the four rivulets of the Dhansiri. The river Kakodonga marks the border between Golaghat and Jorhat districts.

=== National protected area ===
- Kaziranga National Park (Part)
- Nambor - Doigrung Wildlife Sanctuary

=== Climate ===
The climate is tropical with a hot and humid weather prevailing most of the summer and monsoon months. Total average annual rainfall is 1300 mm. Maximum precipitation occurs in June and July. Maximum temperature is 38.0 °C in June and minimum temperature is 8.0 °C in December.

== Divisions ==
There are four Assam Legislative Assembly constituencies in this district: Bokakhat, Sarupathar, Golaghat, and Khumtai. All four are in the Kaliabor Lok Sabha constituency.

=== Administration ===
Within the merged establishment of the Deputy Commissioner, Golaghat are the Offices of the Sub-Divisional Officers, Dhansiri and Bokakhat. There are multiple functions and issues looked after by the Deputy Commissioner's office from its headquarters. The branches of the Office of the Deputy Commissioner are rationalized as Administration, Civil Defence, Confidential, Development, Election, Excise, Home Guards, Magisterial, Nazarat, Personnel, Registration, Revenue, Supply, Treasury and Zila Sainik Board. The Courts of District and Session Judge are also located in its headquarters at Golaghat.

=== Villages ===
- Sapjuri

== Demographics ==
According to the 2011 census Golaghat district has a population of 1,066,888, roughly equal to the nation of Cyprus or the US state of Rhode Island. This gives it a ranking of 430th in India (out of a total of 640). The district has a population density of 302 inhabitants per square kilometre (780/sq mi) . Its population growth rate over the decade 2001-2011 was 11.88%. Golaghat has a sex ratio of 961 females for every 1000 males, and a literacy rate of 78.31%. 9.16% of the population lives in urban areas. Scheduled Castes and Scheduled Tribes make up 5.84% and 10.48% of the population respectively.

Historical population
Year	Pop.	±% p.a.
1901	158,474	—
1911	184,701	+1.54%
1921	221,328	+1.83%
1931	261,816	+1.69%
1941	265,148	+0.13%
1951	317,550	+1.82%
1961	400,238	+2.34%
1971	523,707	+2.73%
1991	828,096	+2.32%
2001	946,279	+1.34%
2011	1,066,888	+1.21%

=== Religion ===
Religions in Golaghat district (2011)
Religion	Percent
Hinduism	85.99%
Islam	8.46%
Christianity	4.74%
Other or not stated	0.81%

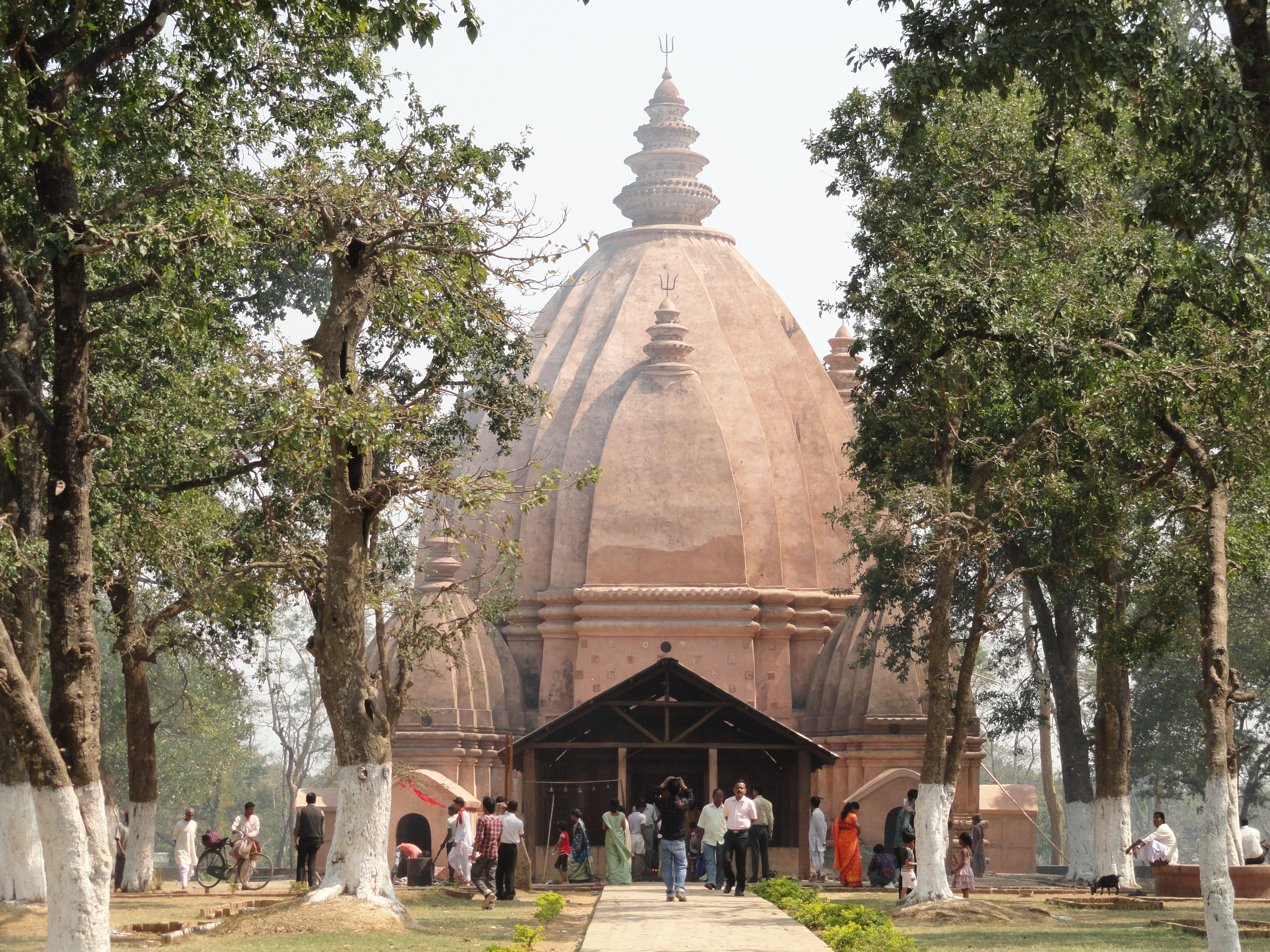
Negheriting Shiva Doul temple is a major temple in Golaghat district

Hinduism is followed by majority of the people in Golaghat district: 85.99%. Muslims form 8.46% of population. while Christians are 4.74% of the population.

=== Languages ===
Languages of Golaghat district (2011)
1. Assamese (78.4%)
2. Bengali (4.59%)
3. Mising (2.71%)
4. Nepali (2.50%)
5. Boro (1.86%)
6. Hindi (1.79%)
7. Sadri (1.52%)
8. Odia (1.36%)
9. Others (5.27%)

According to the 2011 census, 78.40% of the population speak Assamese, 4.59% Bengali, 2.71% Mising, 2.50% Nepali, 1.86% Boro, 1.79% Hindi, 1.52% Sadri and 1.36% Odia as their first language.

== Territorial dispute ==
Around 420 km^{2} (160 sq mi) of Golaghat district is under occupation by the state of Nagaland (Merapani region). There were major conflicts between the two sides in 1979 and 1985, with 54 and 41 deaths respectively. Almost all the deaths were from the Assamese side and the attackers included NSCN militants and Nagaland Police.

== Culture ==
Golaghat district crowns many literary intellects who have made outstanding contributions to Assamese literature. The most prominent writer of the 19th century who hailed from Golaghat was Hem Chandra Barua, the writer of first Assamese dictionary Hemkosh. Raghunath Mahanta, Satradhikar of Doyang Alengi Satra of Golaghat, was another writer of 19th century who composed three masterpieces, namely Shatrunjoy Kavya, Adbhoot Ramayan and Katha Ramayan. One significant poet of the Ahom age was Durgeswar Dwiji. He composed a book titled Sangkhosur Badh. Hem Chandra Goswami is regarded as one of the most exceptional writers of the late 19th century and early twentieth century. He is the first sonnet writer of Assamese language. The credit of first Assamese poetess plus first Assamese short story writer amongst women went to Yamuneswari Khatoniar of Golaghat. Her collection of verses called Arun was the first book written by a woman poet.

Raibahadur Ghanashyam Barua of Golaghat, who was also famous in the field of politics as the first Central Minister of Assam, translated William Shakespeare's The Comedy of Errors into the Assamese language along with three of his partners. Kamal Chandra Sarma of Golaghat enjoyed the influential position of secretary of 'Asomiya Bhasa Unnoti Sadhini Sabha'. Syed Abdul Malik, the invincible writer of Assamese literature, belongs to the village of Nahoroni in Golaghat. He was the president of Assam Sahitya Sabha. Malik received many exalted prizes, including Sahitya Akademy, Sankar Dev Award, Xahityacharyya, etc.

Other people from Golaghat who marked their names as great writers of Assamese literature include Surendranath Saikia, Hari Parsad Barua, Kirtinath Hazarika, Dr Nagen Saikia, Dr Debo Prasad Barooah, Nilamoni Phukan, Samir Tanti, Lakhikanta Mahanta, Purna Chandra Goswami, Dr Upen Kakoty, Lolit Barua, Golap Khound and Premadhar Dutta. The Golaghat Sahitya Sabha is one of the oldest congresses of Assam Sahitya Sabha, started in 1918.

== Flora and fauna ==
In 1974 Golaghat district became home to Kaziranga National Park, which has an area of 472 km^{2} (182.2 mi^{2}). It shares the park with Nagaon district. It also home to Nambor - Doigrung Wildlife Sanctuary.

== Notable people ==
- Manoj Gogoi, animal rescuer at Kaziranga National Park
- Lovlina Borgohain, Indian Boxer (Olympic medalist).
- Kushal Konwar, an Indian freedom fighter from Assam.
