= Mafizuddin Ahmed Hazarika =

Indian writer

Munshi; Maulvi; Mafizuddin Ahmed Hazarika
- মফিজুদ্দিন আহমদ হাজৰিকা
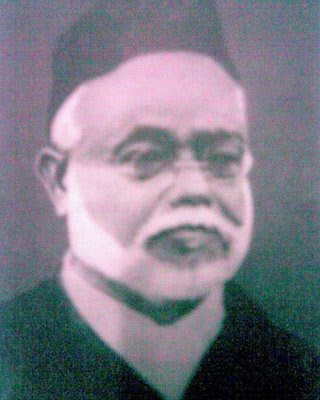
- Portrait of Hazarika
- Pronunciation: [mɔfizudːin aɦmɔd ɦazɔɹika]
- Born: 30 August 1870; Dibrugarh, Assam, Bengal Presidency, British India
- Died: 29 October 1958 (aged 88); Dibrugarh, Assam, India
- Resting place: Amolapatty Cemetery, Dibrugarh, Assam
- Citizenship: British Indian (1870–1947); Indian (1947–1958)
- Occupations: Poet; author; forester; land revenue officer
- Years active: 1896–1958
- Works: Bibliography
- Movement: Jonaki era
- Honours: Full list

12th President of the Asam Sahitya Sabha
- In office 1930–1930
- Preceded by: Kamalakanta Bhattacharya
- Succeeded by: Nagendra Narayan Choudhury
- Writing career
- Other name: Jñān-Mālinīr Kabi
- Language: Assamese
- Period: Modern
- Genre: Poetry
- Subjects: Self-realization; mysticism; sufism; divine love; ethics
- Notable works: Jñān-Mālinī; Tattva Pārijāt

Mafizuddin Ahmed Hazarika (Note: Assamese pronunciation: [mɔfizudːin aɦmɔd ɦazɔɹika].) (Assamese: মফিজুদ্দিন আহমদ হাজৰিকা, pronounced [mɔfizudːin aɦmɔd ɦazɔɹika]; 30 August 1870 – 29 October 1958) was an Indian poet belonging to the Jonaki era of Assamese literature. He was popularly known as the Jñān-Mālinīr Kabi (Note: Assamese: জ্ঞান-মালিনীৰ কবি, Assamese pronunciation: [ɡjãn maliniɹ kɔbi], lit. 'Poet of the Knowledge-Gardener'.) and is regarded as one of the prominent contributors to early modern Assamese poetry. He played a significant role in the literary development of Assam during the early twentieth century.

Apart from his literary activities, Hazarika was actively involved in public, educational, and social institutions in colonial Assam. He served as the 12th President of the Asam Sahitya Sabha in 1930, was one of the organisers of the Dibrugarh Sahitya Sabha and served as its secretary from 1904 to 1934, and presided over the Assam Chhatra Sanmilan held at Sivasagar in 1930. He was also associated with the Directorate of Historical and Antiquarian Studies, Assam, as a corresponding member, and was a member of the Assamese Spelling Committee.

== Early life and education ==
Mafizuddin Ahmed Hazarika was born into an Assamese Muslim family to Himmatuddin Ahmed Hazarika and Rahnuri at Jorhatpatty in Dibrugarh, Assam, Bengal Presidency, British Raj on 30 August 1870. He was the second of six sons. According Surya Kumar Bhuyan said , Mofizuddin Ahmend hazarika told his story about his family background in an interview and claiming to be a descendant of Bagh Hazarika, a military commander associated with the Ahom resistance, who fought alongside Lachit Borphukan during the Battle of Saraighat in 1671. Hazarika received his early education at Dibrugarh Government High School. He appeared for the entrance examination in 1892 but was unsuccessful and subsequently discontinued his formal studies. Later reflections by the poet suggested that this setback inspired him to pursue literature and poetry.

== Career ==
=== Government service ===
Hazarika joined the Assam Forest Department in 1893 and was initially posted in North Lakhimpur. He was later transferred to Digboi during the early years of oil exploration in the region. In 1896, he entered judicial service as a Tehsildar in the Civil Court of North Lakhimpur. Owing to health concerns, he moved to Dibrugarh Civil Court in 1902 and eventually retired as a Civil Peshkar in 1926.

In addition to his government service, he held numerous public and civic positions. He served as Religious Instructor and Visitor of Dibrugarh Jail, was a member of the District Committee of the Prisoners Aid Society, and participated in various educational and municipal bodies. He was also a member of the Dibrugarh Municipal Board, the Berry White Medical School Selection Committee, the Assam Central Text Book Committee, and the committee advocating the establishment of a university in Assam in 1944.

=== Literary career ===
Hazarika emerged as one of the pioneering contributors to modern Assamese literature. Although he was a contemporary of the writers of the Jonaki era, he was not directly associated with the magazine itself. Literary historians have described him as an early poet whose works incorporated elements of Sufi philosophy and spiritual thought into modern Assamese poetry. His literary career began in the closing years of the nineteenth century, and he became associated with several literary organizations in Assam. He was among the organizers of the Dibrugarh Sahitya Sabha and served as its secretary from 1904 to 1934. In 1929, he was elected the 12th President of the Asam Sahitya Sabha held in Golaghat. He also presided over the Assam Chhatra Sanmilan in 1930 and was associated with the Assamese Spelling Committee.

His most celebrated work, Jñān-Mālinī, was published in 1896 when he was twenty-six years old. The collection included poems such as Biswokhonikor, Morixali Khoni, and Munisuni Beli. It received widespread acclaim from contemporary literary figures. In a letter written in October 1896, Lakshminath Bezbarua praised the collection for its contribution to Assamese literature, highlighting the quality of its ideas, language, and literary style:

This book has enriched Assamese literature considerably in both thought and language. Your ideas are lofty, your language elegant, and the style through which you express them is exceedingly graceful. By writing poetry, you have proved yourself worthy of holding the poetic mantle. My request to you is that you never let go of this mantle, but from time to time continue to adorn the neck of Assamese literature with such garlands of stories.

— Shri Lakshminath Bezbarua, Calcutta, 18 October 1896

The work was later described by The Assam Herald (1912) as a landmark publication that had transformed Assamese poetic style and demonstrated how elevated themes could be expressed in refined Assamese prose and verse. Literary scholar Nagen Saikia observed that the collection added a distinctive literary stream to the development of Assamese poetic tradition at the turn of the twentieth century.

Although Hazarika planned additional collections, including Mālinīr Bīn and Tattva Pārijāt, financial difficulties prevented their publication during his lifetime. According to family accounts, the manuscript of Mālinīr Bīn was lost during the erosion of the Dibru River, while the manuscript of Tattva Pārijāt survived in family custody which was published posthumously in 1970.

=== Literary style and themes ===
Hazarika's poetry is characterized by spiritual reflection, ethical concerns, and philosophical inquiry. His works frequently address themes such as the impermanence of worldly life, moral self-improvement, divine knowledge, and the relationship between the individual and the Supreme Being.

Critics have noted that he employed simple, idiomatic Assamese rather than heavily Sanskritized diction. This linguistic approach enabled him to communicate complex philosophical concepts to a broad readership. Several literary historians have identified the influence of Islamic Sufi thought in his poetry. His writings have been described as combining elements of Islamic mysticism with philosophical concepts found in Dharmic traditions. Scholars have therefore regarded him as an important contributor to the development of spiritual and philosophical poetry in Assamese literature. His poetry has also been noted for its visual imagery and descriptive power. Some critics have considered him among the early Assamese poets whose works display characteristics associated with imagistic poetic expression.

== Personal life ==
Hazarika married Hafiza Khatun, daughter of Sheikh Piyar Ali Hazarika of North Lakhimpur. The couple had fourteen children, comprising seven sons and seven daughters, although several died in infancy.

During the erosion of the Dibru River, the family lost their ancestral residence at Jorhatpatty and relocated to Shantipara in Dibrugarh in 1942. They later settled at Boiragimath.

== Death ==
Mofizuddin Ahmed Hazarika died on 29 October 1958 at the age of 88. He was buried at the Amolapatty Burial Ground in Dibrugarh.

== Bibliography ==
Poetry collections

- Jñān-Mālinī (জ্ঞান-মালিনী, lit. 'Knowledge-Gardener'; 1896)
- Tattva Pārijāt (তত্ত্ব পাৰিজাত, lit. 'Heavenly Tree of Truth'; 1970)

== Awards and honours ==
- Literary Pension from the Government of Assam (1926)
- Presidency of the Asam Sahitya Sabha (1930)

== See also ==
- Assamese literature
- History of Assamese literature
- List of Asam Sahitya Sabha presidents
- List of Assamese-language poets
- List of Assamese writers with their pen names
