= List of Asam Sahitya Sabha presidents =

Asam Sahitya Sabha (Assamese: অসম সাহিত্য সভা), Assamese pronunciation: [/ɔxɔm xaɦittjɔ xɔbʱa/] or "English: Assam Literary Society) was founded in 1917 in Assam, India to promote the culture of Assam and Assamese literature.

Except regular biennially seasons in 2000 and 2002 special session was held at Jorhat and Kalgachia.

== President, Time and Place ==
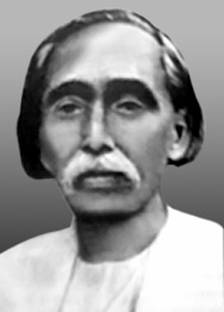
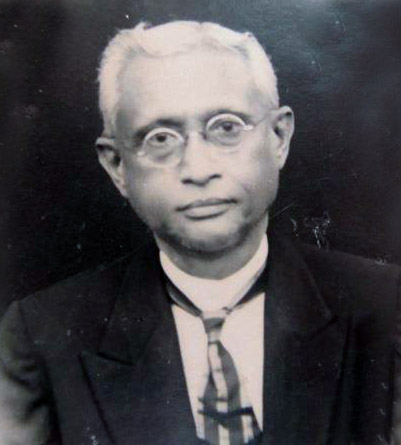
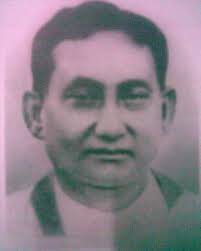
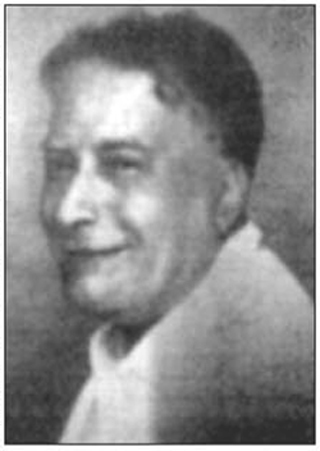
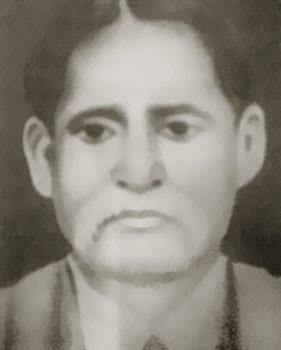
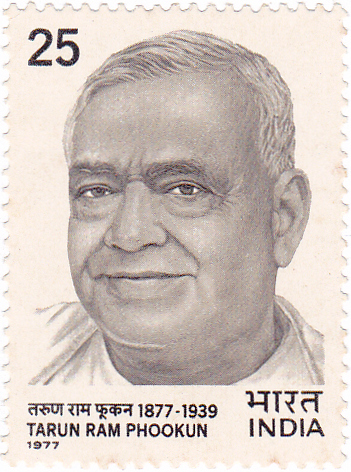
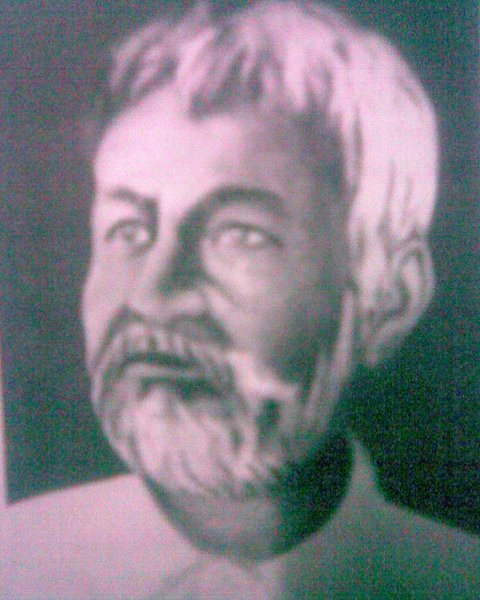
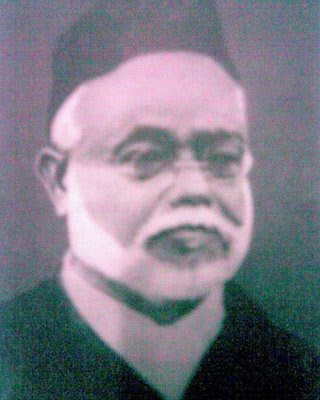
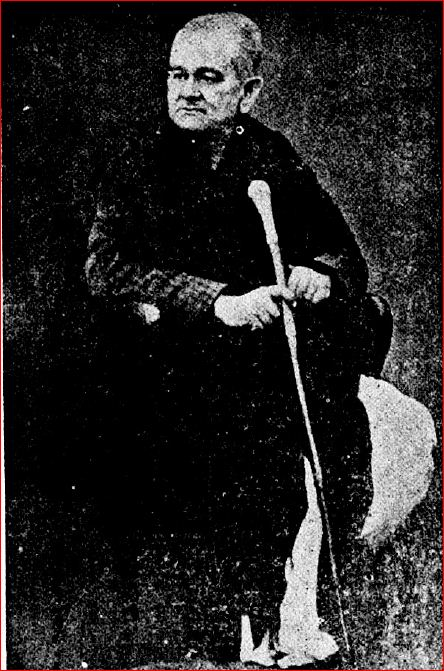
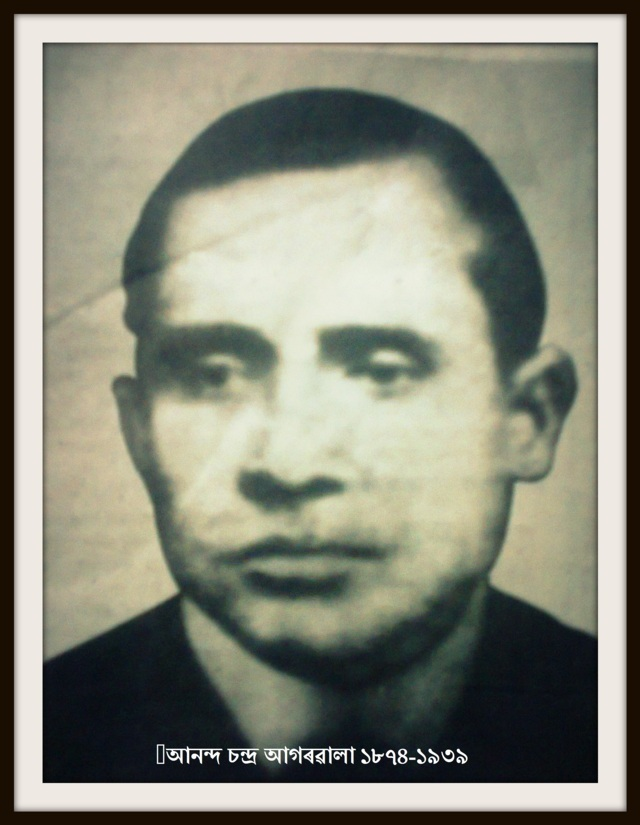
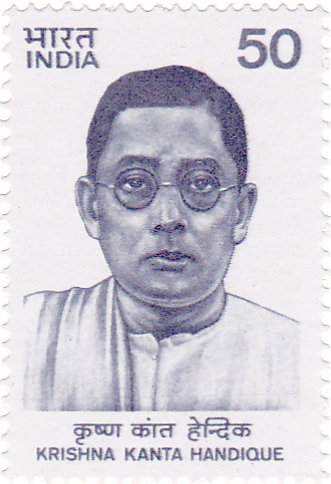
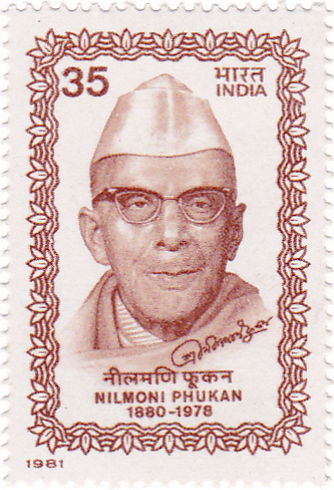
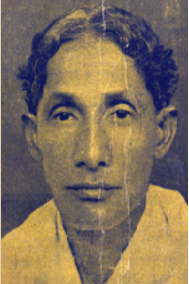
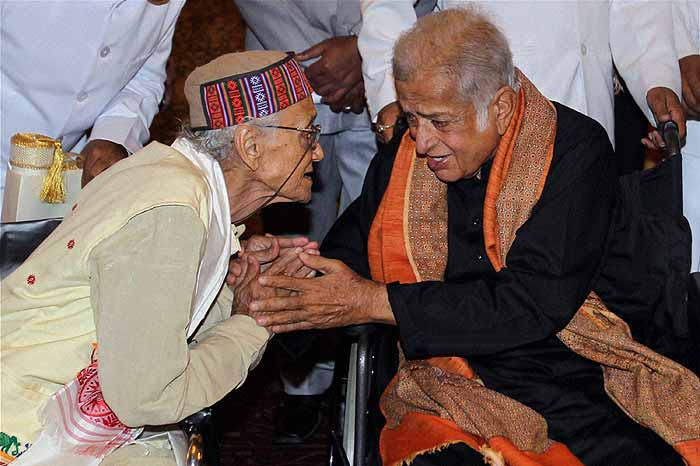
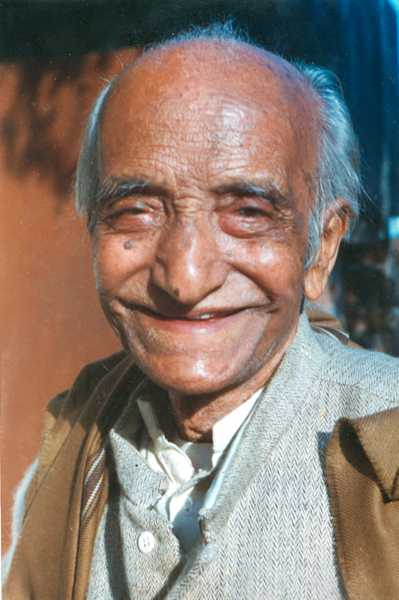
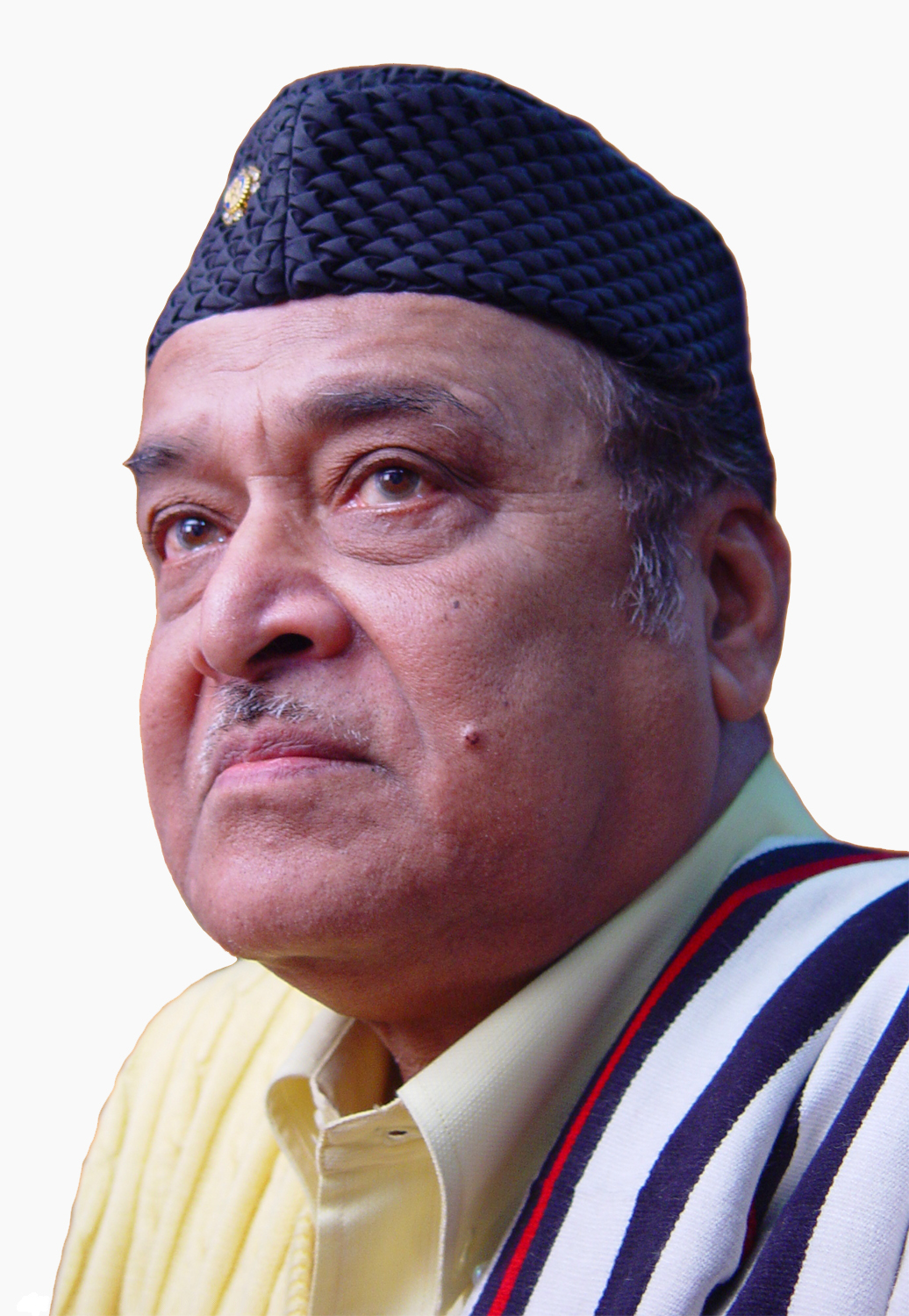
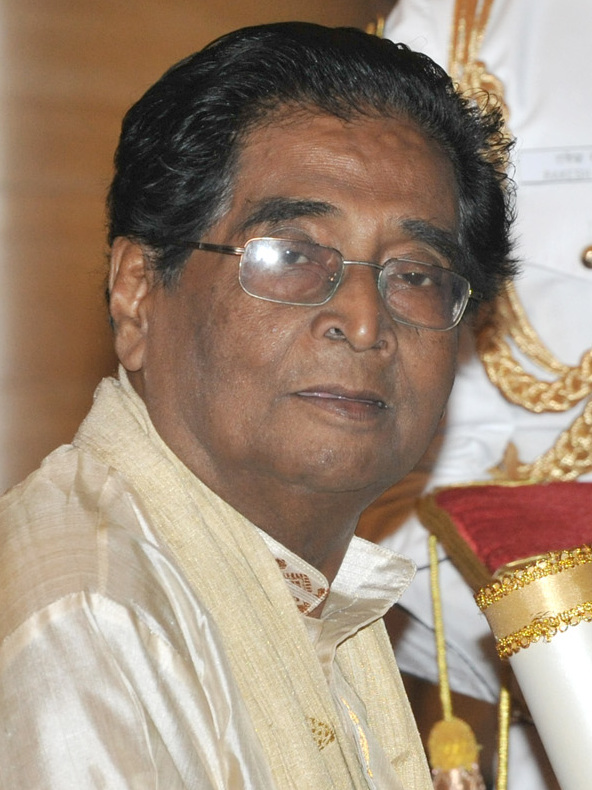
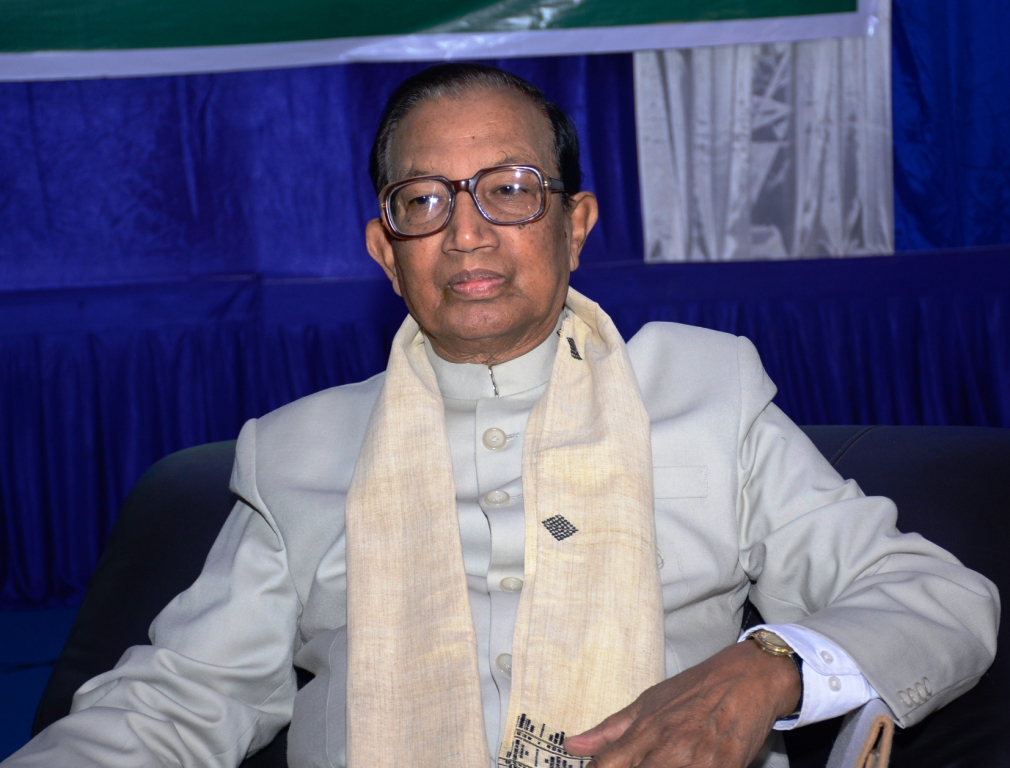
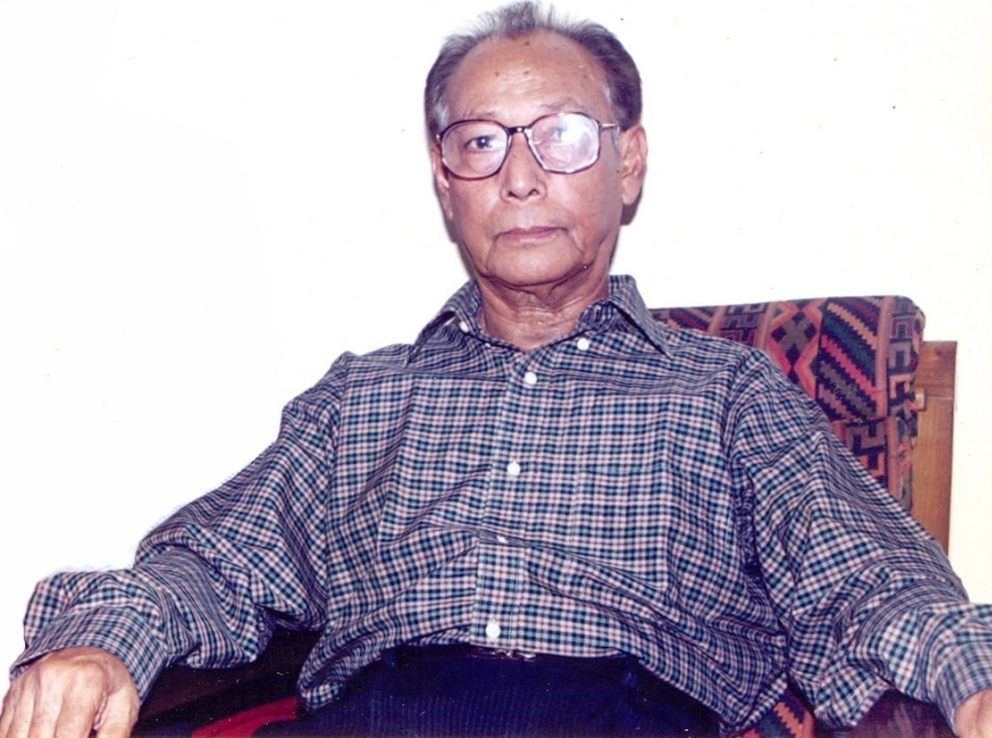
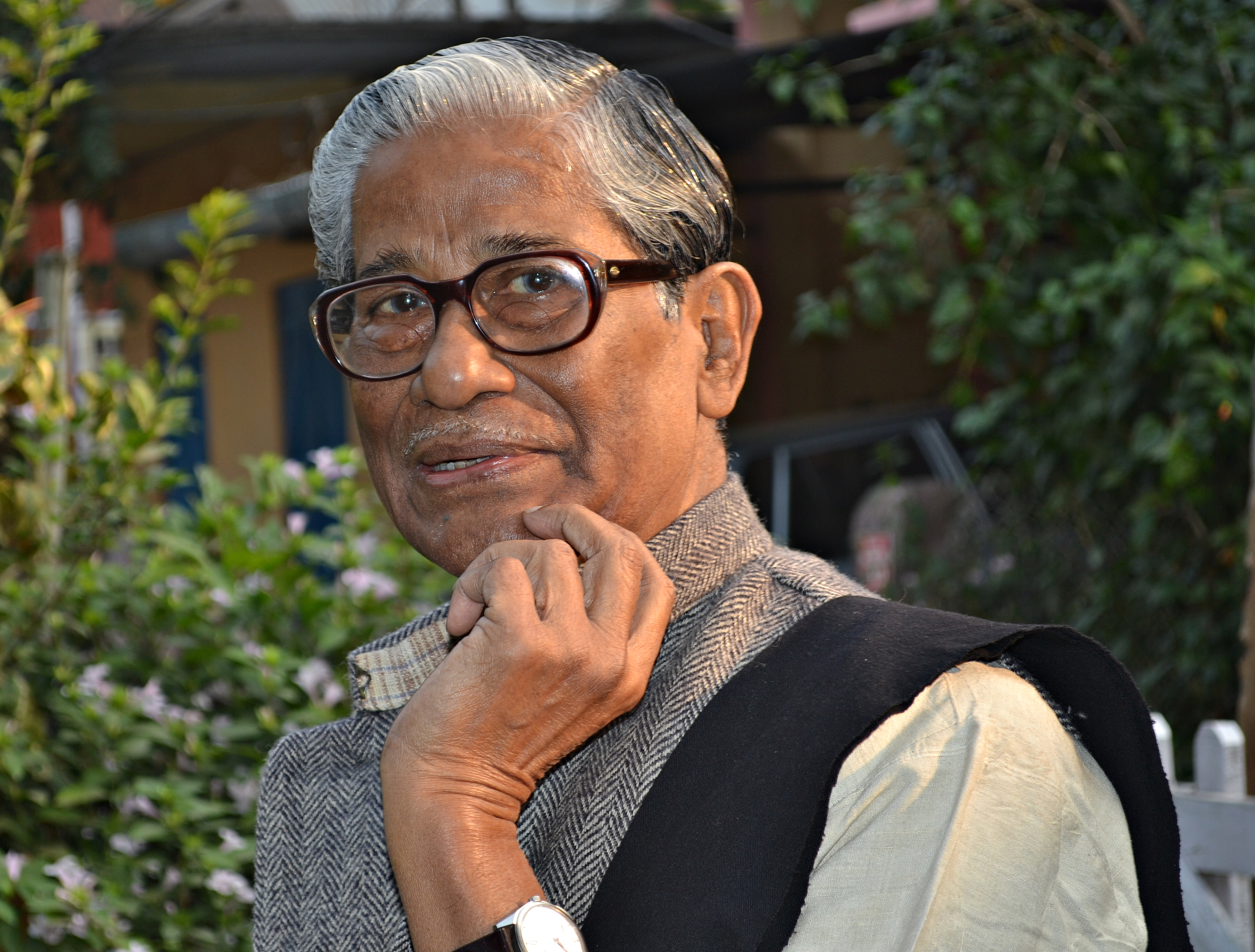
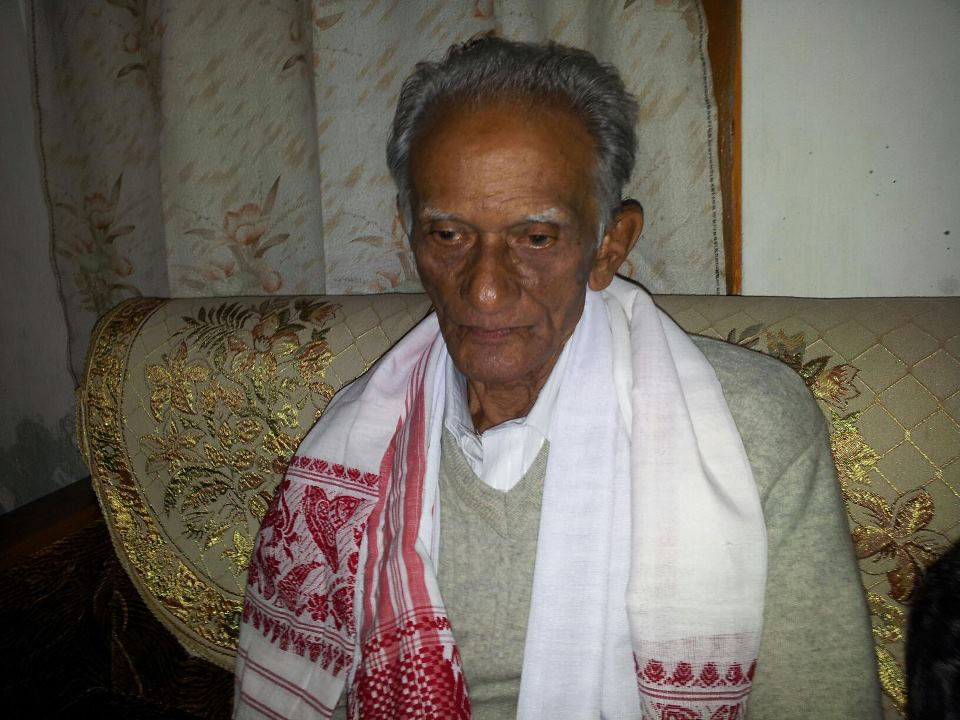
| Sl. No. | Year | Venue | Photo | Name |
| 1 | 1917 | Sibsagar | | Padmanath Gohain Baruah (1871-1946) |
| 2 | 1918 | Goalpara | | Chandradhar Barua (1874-1961) |
| 3 | 1919 | Barpeta | | Kaliram Medhi (1880-1954) |
| 4 | 1920 | Tezpur | | Hemchandra Goswami (1872-1928) |
| 5 | 1923 | Jorhat | | Amrit Bhushan Dev Adhikari (1858-1942) |
| 6 | 1924 | Dibrugarh | | Kanaklal Barua (1872-1940) |
| 7 | 1924 | Guwahati | | Lakshminath Bezbaroa (1864-1938) |
| 8 | 1925 | Nagaon | | Rajanikanta Bordoloi (1867-1940) |
| 9 | 1926 | Dhuburi | | Benudhar Rajkhowa (1872-1955) |
| 10 | 1927 | Goalpara | | Tarunram Phukan (1877-1939) |
| 11 | 1929 | Jorhat | | Kamalakanta Bhattacharya (1853-1936) |
| 12 | 1930 | Golaghat | | Mofizuddin Ahmed Hazarika (1870-1958) |
| 13 | 1931 | Sibsagar | | Nagendra Narayan Choudhury (1881-1947) |
| 14 | 1933 | North Lakhimpur | | Jnanadabhiram Barua (1880-1955) |
| 15 | 1934 | Mangaldoi | | Ananda Chandra Agarwala (1874-1939) |
| 16 | 1936 | Tezpur | | Raghunath Choudhari (1879-1967) |
| 17 | 1937 | Guwahati | | Krishna Kanta Handique (1898-1982) |
| 18 | 1940 | Jorhat | | Moidul Islam Bora (1899-1944) |
| 19 | 1944 | Sibsagar | | Nilmani Phukan (1880-1978) |
| 20 | 1947 | Dibrugarh | | Nilmani Phukan (1880-1978) |
| 21 | 1950 | Margherita | | Ambikagiri Raichoudhury (1885-1967) |
| 22 | 1953 | Shillong | | Surya Kumar Bhuyan (1892-1964) |
| 23 | 1955 | Jorhat | | Nalini Bala Devi (1898-1977) |
| 24 | 1955 | Guwahati | | Jatindra Nath Duwora (1892-1964) |
| 25 | 1956 | Dhuburi | | Benudhar Sarma (1894-1981) |
| 26 | 1958 | Tinisukia | | Padmadhar Chaliha (1895-1969) |
| 27 | 1959 | Nagaon | | Atul Chandra Hazarika (1903-1986) |
| 28 | 1960 | Palashbari | | Trailokya Nath Goswami (1906-1988) |
| 29 | 1961 | Goalpara | | Trailokya Nath Goswami (1906-1988) |
| 30 | 1963 | Nazira | | Ratnakanta Borkakati (1897-1963) |
| 31 | 1964 | Digboi | | Mitradev Mahanta (1894-1983) |
| 32 | 1965 | Nalbari | | Dimbeswar Neog (1899-1966) |
| 33 | 1966 | North Lakhimpur | | Binanda Chandra Barua (1901-1994) |
| 34 | 1967 | Dibrugarh | | Nakul Chandra Bhuyan (1895-1968) |
| 35 | 1968 | Tezpur | | Jnanath Bora (1890-1968) |
| 36 | 1969 | Barpeta | | Ananda Chandra Barua (1907-1983) |
| 37 | 1970 | Dhing | | Upendra Chandra Lekharu (1905-1979) |
| 38 | 1971 | Makum | | Tirtha Nath Sarma (1911-1986) |
| 39 | 1972 | Dhuburi | | Hem Barua (1915-1977) |
| 40 | 1973 | Rangia | | Giridhar Sarma (1912-1977) |
| 41 | 1974 | Mangaldoi | | Maheshwar Neog (1915-1995) |
| 42 | 1975 | Titabor | | Satyendranath Sarma (1917-1999) |
| 43 | 1976 | Tihu | | Jagheshwar Sarma (1906-1998) |
| 44 | 1977 | Abhayapuri | | Syed Abdul Malik (1919-2000) |
| 45 | 1978 | Golaghat | | Prasannalal Choudhury (1898-1986) |
| 46 | 1979 | Sualkuchi | | Atul Chandra Barua (1916-2001) |
| 47 | 1980 | Roha | | Jatindra Nath Goswami (1918-2005) |
| 48 | 1981 | Tinisukia | | Sitanath Brahmachoudhury (1908-1982) |
| 49 | 1982 | Diphu | | Sitanath Brahmachoudhury (1908-1982) |
| 50 | 1983 | Bongaigaon | | Birendra Kumar Bhattacharya (1924-1997) |
| 51 | 1985 | Bihpuria | | Jogesh Das (1927-1999) |
| 52 | 1986 | Kampur | | Biren Borkotoki (1924-2002) |
| 53 | 1987 | Pathsala | | Mahendra Bora (1929-1996) |
| 54 | 1988 | Hailakandi | | Kirthi Nath Hazarika (1922-2002) |
| 55 | 1989 | Doomdooma | | Mahim Bora (1924-2016) |
| 56 | 1990 | Biswanath Chariali | | Nabakanta Barua (1926-2002) |
| 57 | 1991 | Dudhnoi | | Nirmal Prabha Bordoloi (1933-2004) |
| 58 | 1992 | Goreshwar | | Lakshyadhar Choudhury (1914-2000) |
| 59 | 1993 | Sibsagar | | Bhupen Hazarika (1926-2011) |
| 60 | 1994 | Morigaon | | Lila Gogoi (1930-1994) |
| 61 | 1995 | Sarthebari | | Hitesh Deka (1924-2000) |
| 62 | 1996 | Bokakhat | | Lakshmi Nandan Bora (1932-2021) |
| 63 | 1997 | Bilasipara | | Nagen Saikia (1939-) |
| 64 | 1998 | Howraghat | | Nagen Saikia (1939-) |
| 65 | 1999 | Hajo | | Chandra Prasad Saikia (1927-2006) |
| 66 | 2000 | Jorhat | | Chandra Prasad Saikia (1927-2006) |
| 67 | 2001 | Dibrugarh | | Homen Borgohain (1932-2021) |
| 68 | 2002 | Kalgachia | | Homen Borgohain (1932-2021) |
| 69 | 2003 | North Lakhimpur | | Birendra Nath Datta (1935-2023) |
| 70 | 2004 | Hojai | | Birendra Nath Datta (1935-2023) |
| 71 | 2005 | Sipajhar | | Kanak Sen Deka (1933-) |
| 72 | 2006 | Belsar | | Kanak Sen Deka (1933-) |
| 73 | 2007 | Chapar | | Kanak Sen Deka (1933-) |
| 74 | 2009 | Dhemaji | | Rongbong Terang (1937-) |
| 75 | 2010 | Dergaon | | Rongbong Terang (1937-) |
| 76 | 2013 | Barpeta Road | | Imran Shah (1933-) |
| 77 | 2014 | Guwahati | | Imran Shah (1933-) |
| 78 | 2015 | Kaliabor | | Dhrubajyoti Bora (1955-) |
| 79 | 2016 | Kaliabor | | Dhrubajyoti Bora (1955-) |
| 80 | 2017 | Kaliabor | | Dhrubajyoti Bora (1955-) |
| 81 | 2018 | Bardumsa | | Paramananda Rajbongshi (1959-) |
| 82 | 2019 | Raha | | Paramananda Rajbongshi (1959-) |
| 83 | 2020 | Sualkuchi | | Kuladhar Saikia (1959-) |
| 84 | 2022 | Narayanpur | | Surjya Kanta Hazarika (1956-) |
