= Amrit Bhushan Dev Adhikari =

- Born: 1858; Dolgoma Sattra, Goalpara district, Assam
- Died: 1942 (aged 83–84)

Amrit Bhushan Dev Adhikari (1858–1942). Back in 1810 Saka (Shaka era), king of Gauripur, Bahadur organised "All Goalpara convention". The hidden agenda behind this was to make Goalpara a Bengali-speaking district. But not even the king of Goalpara, Prabhat Chandra Baruah learned of this. Amrit Bhusan Dev Adhikari was one of the many exponents who threw apart this conspiracy. Adhikari was a sincere and dedicated person. He wrote regular columns and articles in contemporary magazines of the time like Ba'hi, Abwahan. He was a scholar in Sanskrit literature.

== Early years ==
ABD Adhikari was born in 1858 AD, at Dolgoma Sat'ra in Goalpara district of Assam. His father, Kathabhusan Dev Adhikari and mother Akashilata belonged to the family of Naraharidev, who had established the Dolgoma Sat'ra. After the demise of his father, ABD Adhikari stayed with his elder brother, Rajendra Bhusan and continued his studies. He went to then Calcutta for higher studies. He took admission in Scottish Church ( then General Assembly Institution), but couldn't complete his graduation due to the sudden death of his brother in his third year.

== Later years ==
ABD Adhikari came back to Assam and got a job in Bezbaruah High School Jorhat as assistant headmaster. Thereafter, he joined a newly established High school in Gauripur as assistant headmaster.

== Contributions ==
ABD Adhikari wrote a book namely "Srimon Naam Ghukha"(শ্ৰীমন নামঘোষা)in 1911. The book is a simplification of Sri Madhavdeva's Naam Ghosha. ABD Adhikari presided over the fifth session of Asam Sahitya Sabha held in Jorhat district from 31 March 1923 AD.

== See also ==
- Assamese literature
- History of Assamese literature
- List of Asam Sahitya Sabha presidents
- List of Assamese writers with their pen names
