= Dhrubajyoti Bora =

Indian writer

Dhruba Jyoti Borah
- Born: 27 November 1955 (age 70); Shillong, Meghalaya, India
- Occupation: Doctor
- Known for: Writer, novelist
- Website: https://dhrubajyotiborah.com

Dr. Dhrubajyoti Bora (a.k.a. Dr. Dhruba Jyoti Borah), a medical doctor by profession, is a Guwahati-based Assamese writer and novelist. In a literary career spanning around three decades he has published many critically acclaimed works of fiction and non-fiction including more than twenty four books – Novels, monographs on history, travelogues, collection of articles etc. Most notably, he was honored with the Sahitya Akademi Award in 2009.

== Early life and education ==
Born on 27 November 1955, he was educated in Jorhat, Assam Medical College and Gauhati Medical College and Hospital.

== Career ==
Professor Borah is at present working as a Vice Chancellor of Srimanta Sankaradeva University of Health Sciences, Guwahati, Assam. He joined on 27 June 2019 after being transferred from Assam Hills Medical College, Diphu of Assam.

== Literary career ==
Dhrubajyoti Bora's is a significant voice in contemporary Assamese literature. He has published novels these are that include Kalantarar Gadya (Prose of Tempest), Tejor Andhar (Darkness of Blood) and Arth (Meaning), a trilogy based on tragedy of Assam have been acknowledged as major literary creations. His major non-fiction works include a monograph on the medieval peasant struggle (on Moamoria rebellion) of Assam and a study of the development of the Assamese language. He has written on history and social issues and literature. His books on the history of the Second World War, the French Revolution and a two-volume set on the Russian Revolution are first such books in the Assamese language. His fictional works have been translated into Hindi, English, Bengali, Malayalam and Bodo languages. Katha Ratnakar (2007) is based on the situation of the marginalised Scheduled Castes and Scheduled Tribes in Assam and the lives of Keots (Kaibartas).

He edits the academic research quarterly Yaatra : The Journal of Assamese Literature and Culture.

== Historical narratives ==
- Farasi Biplav
- Ditiyo Mahasamar
- Bhaktir Anirudh Yatra History of Bhakti Movement in Assam

== Novels ==
- 1987 Bhok (collection of two novels in Assamese, Journal Emporium, Nalbari)
- 1990 Loha (historical Novel based on mediaeval iron industry of Assam, Student Stories, Guwahati, 1990)
- 1994 Yatrik Aru Annanya (Banalata Publishers, Guwahati)
- 1997 Kalantadarar Gadya (Prose of Tempest, first in the trilogy, Students' Stores, Guwahati)
- Tejor Endhar (second part of the trilogy)
- 2003 Artha (third part of the trilogy)
- 2015 Sahashra Hemantar Trishaagni

Collection of Short Stories

- 2007 Katha-Ratnakar

== Awards ==
- 2001 Ambikagiri Raichoudhury Award of Asom Sahitya Sabha for his novel Kalantarar Gadya.
- 2009 Sahitya Akademi Award for the novel Katha-Ratnakar.
- Recipient of Dr. D.P. Basu award for young scientists of A.C.S.

== See also ==
- Assamese literature
- History of Assamese literature
- List of Asam Sahitya Sabha presidents
- List of Assamese-language poets
- List of Assamese writers with their pen names
