= Nirmal Prabha Bordoloi =

Indian writer

- Born: 1932 or 1933
- Died: 1 June 2004; Guwahati, Assam, India
- Resting place: Guwahati
- Education: Gauhati University
- Occupations: Poet, songwriter
- Children: 1
- Writing career
- Language: Assamese
- Subject: Assamese
- Notable works: "Kabita: Bon Faringar Rong", "Samipesu", "Antarang", "Asamar Luko Sangonskriti", "Siba", "Asamar Luko Kabita"
- Notable awards: Sahitya Akademi Award

Nirmal Prabha Bordoloi (1932/1933 – 1 June 2004) was an Indian poet, songwriter and folklorist associated with Assamese literature. She was president of the Asam Sahitya Sabha in 1991 held at Dudhnoi in Goalpara district. She received several awards. In 1983 she received a Sahitya Akademi Award for her poetry book Sudirgha Din Aru Ritu. She also received the president's Award in 1957 for children's literature and the Asam Sahitya Sabha award in 1977 and 1989 for her non-fiction books 'Dinar Pisat Din' and 'Debi'. She has also won the 'Saraswati Sanman' title in 1987.

== Life and career ==
Bordoloi was married as a child at the age of 11. She wrote over 54 Assamese and English books and numerous songs. Notable among these songs are Kabita: Bon Faringar Rong, Samipesu, Antarang, Asamar Luko Sangonskriti, Siba, Asamar Luko Kabita.

Her first collection of poems was 'Bon Faringar Rang'.

=== Some other collection of poems ===
Dinor Pasot Din

Samipehu

Antaranga

Sudirgha Din Aru Ritu

=== Song collections ===
Xunboroniya Aai

Xuriya Geet

=== Other literary works ===
Devi

Shiva

Surjya

== Death ==
She died on 1 June 2004 at the age of 71.

== See also ==
- Assamese literature
- List of people from Assam
- List of Asam Sahitya Sabha presidents
- List of Assamese writers with their pen names
- List of Sahitya Akademi Award winners for Assamese
