= Jonaki (magazine) =

Assamese language magazine

- Former editors: Previous editors Chandra Kumar Agarwala; Hemchandra Goswami; Satyanath Borah; Kanaklal Baruah
- Staff writers: Staff writers Chandra Kumar Agarwala; Hemchandra Goswami; Lakshminath Bezbaroa; Kanaklal Baruah
- Categories: Literature
- Frequency: Monthly
- Publisher: Chandra Kumar Agarwala
- First issue: 9 February 1889; 136 years ago
- Final issue: 1903; 122 years ago
- Company: Asamiya Bhasa Unnati Sadhini Sabha
- Country: India
- Based in: Calcutta
- Language: Assamese

Jonaki (Assamese: জোনাকী; lit Moonlight) was an Assamese language magazine published from Calcutta in 1889. It was also the mouthpiece of the then Assamese literary society Asamiya Bhasa Unnati Sadhini Sabha in which the society’s aim and objectives were regularly expressed. The first editor of the magazine was Chandra Kumar Agarwala.

== History ==
The Asamiya Bhasa Unnati Sadhini Sabha, after its formation in 1888, decided to publish a new monthly Assamese magazine. But the bigger problem was to finance it since all the associated members of the society were students. Chandra Kumar Agarwala, who belonged to a rich business family, came forward to finance the magazine and named it Jonaki ("Moonlight"). Agarwala was a FA student in Presidency College then and also a member of the society. He put forward two conditions to publish and edit the magazine:

1. Every member must take care of Jonaki;
2. Every member must write an article for Jonaki.

If those conditions were not met by anyone, a fine of Rs 15 would be imposed on him. The society accepted the conditions and the first issue was published. The exact publication date is not known, since only the Assamese month ‘Māgho’ and the year of publication 1889 were mentioned in the magazine, but the first edition is believed to have been put out on 9 February 1889. The printing of the magazine continued until 1898. Publishing resumed in Guwahati in 1901 and continued until 1903. Satyanath Borah and Kanaklal Baruah were the editors of the Guwahati editions.

== Aim and objectives ==
One unusual feature of the magazine was that it did not have an editorial. Rather, it contained a regular column called Atmokotha (Self-sketches) in which the ideology of the magazine as well as the society was expressed. The aim and objective of the magazine as expressed in this column in the first edition was (English translation: Uddipan Dutta):

Politics is outside our state of affairs. We should concentrate only on the welfare of the subjects of our servile nationhood. Our subject matters will be literature, science or society- we would strive to comprehend these topics and publish materials in them. We would give space to ‘criticism’ and ‘protests’. But no personal slander would be entertained. Special attention would be given to language. Our endeavour would be to get love and affection from all sections of the Assamese society... We have waged our war against darkness: Objective: development of the nation, and ‘Jonak (moonlight)’ …Works are going on everywhere at a crashing speed, will the Assamese sit down idle at this hour?

== The Jonaki Era ==
Jonaki marked the dawn of romanticism in Assamese literature. The first romantic poem, Bon Kunwori (The Wood Nymph), by Chandra Kumar Agarwala, and the first Assamese sonnet, Priyotomar Sithi (Letter from the beloved), by Hemchandra Goswami, were published in the magazine. Hemchandra Goswami’s Kaku Aru Hiya Nibilau (No More of my Heart to Anybody) was a unique poem of its kind. A regular humorous column titled Kripabor Boruar Kakotor Topola, by Lakshminath Bezbaroa, was also included. Kamalakanta Bhattacharjya’s Pahoroni (Oblivion) and Chandrakumar Agarwala’s Niyor (Dew-drops) were two e-making poems published in the first year of the magazine. The joint efforts of these pioneers established a new era in Assamese literature: The Jonaki Era, or the romantic age. The writers of Orunodoi chose the medium of prose, but the poetic grandeur in Assamese literature was achieved by the poets of the Jonaki group and their contemporaries.

== People associated with the magazine ==
Notable members associated with the magazine include:

- Lakshminath Bezbarua (1864–1938)
- Chandra Kumar Agarwala (1867–1937)
- Devakanta Baruah
- Kamalakanta Bhattacharya
- Hemchandra Goswami (1872–1928)
- Padmanath Gohain Baruah (1871–1946)
- Satyanath Bora (1860–1925)
- Kanaklal Barua (1872–1940)
- Ananda Chandra Agarwala(1874–1940)
- Dharmeswari Debi Baruani (1892–1960)
- Nalinibala Devi (1898–1977)
- Raghunath Choudhary (1879–1968)
- Ambikagiri Raichoudhury (1885–1967)
- Jatindra Nath Duwara(1892–1964)

== Issues ==
The total number of issues of Jonaki published during 1889–1898 is 69.

- 1st year: 11 issues
- 2nd year: 12 issues
- 3rd year: 10 issues
- 4th year: 11 issues
- 5th year: 7 issues
- 6th year: 11 issues
- 7th year: 6 issues
- 8th year: 1 issue

== See also ==
- Assamese Language Movement
- Assamese Literature
