= Nagendra Narayan Choudhury =

Indian writer (1881–1947)

- Born: 1881; Lakhipur, Goalpara, Assam
- Died: 13 November 1947 (aged 65–66); Lakhipur, Goalpara, Assam
- Occupations: Writer, essayists

Nagendra Narayan Choudhury (1881–1947) was a short story writer and essayist from Assam. He was noted for his contribution to the field of Short stories and essays in the Assamese literature during the years of Awahon. He was elected as a president of the Asam Sahitya Sabha in 1931 held at Sivasagar district.

== Brief life ==
Choudhury was born in 1881 at Lakhipur near Goalpara of Assam to Khagendra Narayan Choudhury and Saradapriya Choudhury. After primary education at his birthplace he did his higher education at Dhuburi and Goalpara. After passing the entrance examination from he went to Calcutta and admitted in Jubilee Art Akademi. He died in his own residence at Lakhipur on 13 November 1947.

== Literary works ==
Choudhury was a regular writer in the "Awahan" journal of that time.

Some of his literary works include:

Books

1. Dangai Atmorokshya (দাঙ্গায় আত্মৰক্ষা),
2. Binar Jhonkar (বীণাৰ ঝঙ্কাৰ)

Short stories

1. Nagendra Narayan Chaudhurtr Galpa (নগেন্দ্ৰ নাৰাযণ চৌধুৰীৰ গল্প)(Published in 1963)
2. Usorga (উছৰ্গা),
3. Dutiramor sonkhar (দুটিৰামৰ সংসাৰ),
4. Puhari (পোহাৰী),
5. Modhumaloti (মধুমালতী),
6. Tamor Tabiz (তামৰ তাবিজ),
7. Osompurno aain (অসৰ্ম্পূণ আইন),
8. Mur porisoy kahini (মোৰ পৰিণয় কাহিনী),
9. Bijoya (বিজয়া),
10. Noyontora (নয়নতৰা),
11. Ustadzi (ওস্তাদজী),
12. Lahori (লাহৰী),
13. Protigya (প্ৰতিজ্ঞা),
14. Poriworton (পৰিবৰ্তন),
15. Bogitora (বগীতৰা),
16. Moidam onusondhanot rosayon (মৈদাম অনুসন্ধানত ৰাসায়ন)

Essays

1. Oti luptokai prani (লুপ্ত অতিকায় প্ৰাণী),
2. Vajonor fashion (ভাজনৰ ফেশ্যন),
3. Bodo jatir kotha (বড়ো জাতিৰ কথা),
4. Stree sikhar proujoniyota (স্ত্ৰী শিক্ষাৰ প্ৰয়োজনীয়তা),
5. Ahom puthior bhaxa (আহোম ভাষাৰ পুথি),
6. Gutosoror gupto koshol (গুপ্তচৰৰ গুপ্ত কৌশল),
7. Prag Oitihashikjugor sitrokolpo (প্ৰাগ ঐতিহাসিক যুগৰ চিত্ৰশিল্প),
8. Mur Jiwon Smriti (মোৰ জীৱন স্মৃতি),
9. Seri Kellar Su-nrityo (ছেৰাই কেল্লাৰ ছো-নৃত্য),
10. Monipuri pouranik nrityo (মণিপুৰী পৌৰাণিক নৃত্য)

== See also ==
- Assamese literature
- History of Assamese literature
- List of Asam Sahitya Sabha presidents
- List of Assamese-language poets
- List of Assamese writers with their pen names
