= Nakul Chandra Bhuyan =

Historian and writer

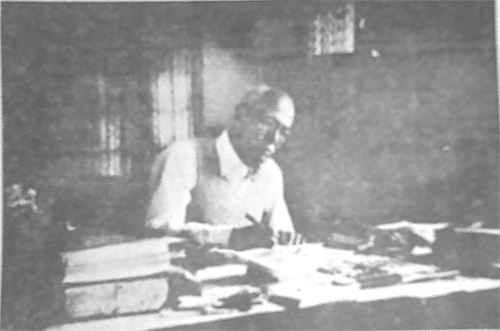
- Nakul Chandra Bhuyan in his Personal Library
- Born: May 1895; Charing, Sibsagar, Assam, India
- Died: 16 January 1968 (aged 72); Jorhat, Assam, India
- Occupations: Assamese historian, playwright, short story writer, tea executive
- Spouse: Kumudeshwari Bhuyan
- Writing career
- Language: Assamese

Nakul Chandra Bhuyan (1895 – 16 January 1968) was an Indian historian, playwright, essayist and a short story writer of Assamese language.

== Life and career ==
The only son of Gopal Chandra Bhuyan and Dalimi Bhuyan, Nakul Chandra Bhuyan was born in 1895 in Charing, Sibsagar District of Assam.

Educated at Jorhat Government Boys' School, Bhuyan passed his matriculation in 1916 and went on to pursue further studies in Calcutta. He returned from Calcutta in 1921 and began working as a Librarian in Dibrugarh, Assam. Later, he joined as an assistant in the Chief Engineering Department of Dibru-Sadiya Railways and thereafter as an assistant in the Deputy Commissioner's office.

In 1923 he got transferred to Tezpur and around the same time married Kumudeshwari Bhuyan. While at Tezpur he came into contact with various theatre personalities working with the Baan theatre, which inspired him to start writing for the stage. Bhuyan was the president of the Asam Sahitya Sabha in 1967 held at Dibrugarh district, Assam. He also compiled and edited the first authentic edition of Bihu songs, titled "Bohagi" in 1923. Padmadhar Chaliha, the poet-composer of some memorable lyrics inspired by the freedom movement wrote around 1921 an introduction and called the Bihu songs pastoral poetry. The Times of Assam in its adulatory review (19 May 1923) went a step further, describing the poetry as comparable to the best of pastoral poetry of the European tradition.

In 1924, Bhuyan gave up government job and joined Cinamara Tea Estate as Assistant Manager. His sincerity, dedication, and hard work led him to the honorable position of Senior Manager of Jorehaut Tea Company. In 1954, he retired from Borsapori Tea Estate as Senior Manager.

In his memory a main Thoroughfare in the heart of Jorhat town has been named as "Xahitik Nakul Chandra Bhuyan Path".

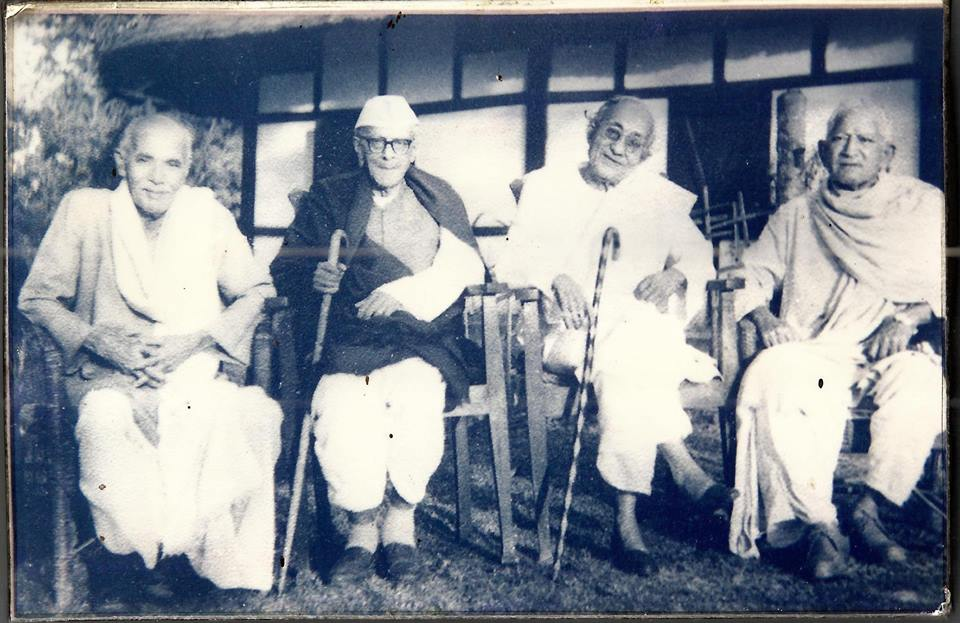
Left to Right, Late Nakul Chandra Bhuyan, President Axom Xahitya Xabha 1967 Late Nilamoni Phookan, President A.X.X 1944,47, Late Jatindra Nath Duorah, President A.X.X 1955, Late Padmadhar Chaliha, President A.X.X 1958

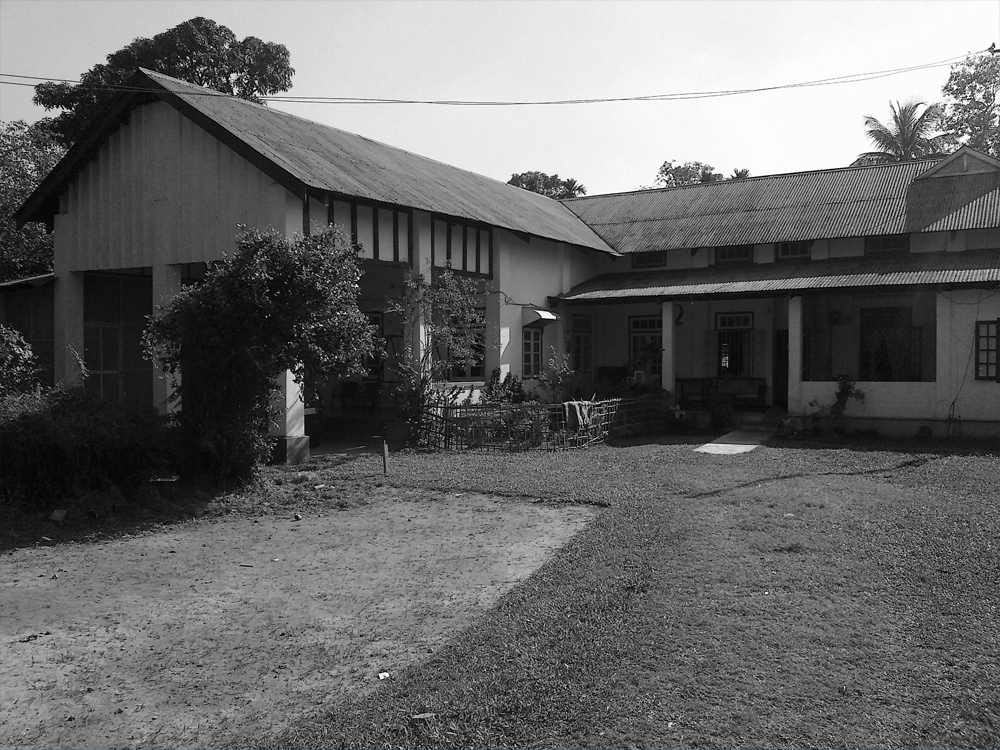
The house of Nakul Chandra Bhuyan is a prominent Heritage Building in the heart of Jorhat town. The house built in 1950s was modeled after the British Tea Estate Bungalows famous in Assam

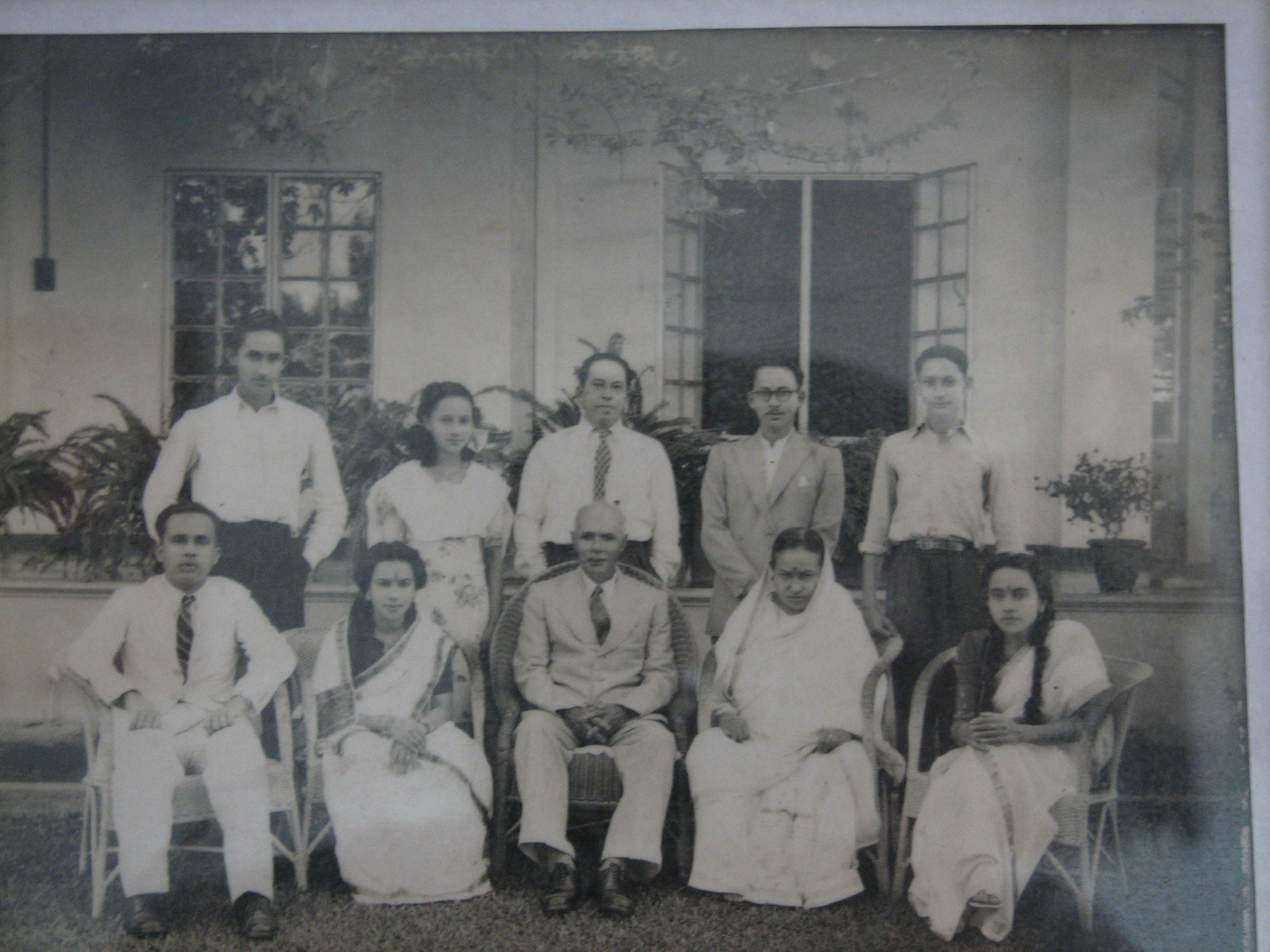
Late Nakul Chandra Bhuyan with his family members.

== Literary works ==
Some of his literary works are:

- Axom Buranjir Ek Adhyai - Baro Bhuyan
- Baro Bhuyanar Somu Buranji
- Suransuar Sora
- Golpar Xorai
- Xahu Aai
- Badan Barphukan
- Chandrakanta Singha
- Bidruhi Moran
- Bohagi
- Numali Kunwari
- Cha Bagisar Banua
- Xunhotor Bhishma
- Gadapanir Sesh Sidhanta (1923)
- Rādhākānta Sandikai ḍāṅarīẏā

== See also ==
- Assamese literature
- List of Asam Sahitya Sabha presidents
- List of Assamese writers with their pen names
