= Lakhipur, Goalpara =

Lakhipur
- Town
- Lakhipur Town
- Location within Assam Location within India
- Country: India
- State: Assam
- District: Goalpara

Government
  - Body: Lakhipur Municipal Board
  - Chairman: Rajesh Prashad Gupta
  - Circle officer: Sri Rajiv Gogoi, ACS
  - Inspector of Police: Bhim Kt. Pegu
- Elevation: 37.32 m (122.4 ft)

Population (2011)
  - Total: 15,633
- Demonym: Lakhipurian

Languages
  - Official: Assamese، English
- Time zone: UTC+5:30 (IST)
- PIN: 783129
- Telephone code: (0091) 03663
- Vehicle registration: AS 18

Lakhipur is a small town in Goalpara district, Assam, India. It is situated at about 45 km towards the west from the district headquarter Goalpara town. The current Lakhipur town consist of ten wards. The Lakhipur Municipal Board has a population of 15,633 of which 8,046 are males while 7,587 are females as per report released by Census India 2011.

== Demographics ==
The population of children with ages 0–6 is 2,279, which is 14.58% of the total population of Lakhipur (TC). In Lakhipur Town Committee, the female sex ratio is 943 against state average of 958. Moreover, the child sex ratio in Lakhipur is around 1013 compared to the Assam state average of 962. The literacy rate of Lakhipur city is 76.43%, higher than the state average of 72.19%. In Lakhipur, male literacy is around 81.62% while the female literacy rate is 70.85%.

=== Religion ===
Religions in Lakhipur town (2011)
1. Islam (55.4%)
2. Hinduism (43.2%)
3. others (1.33%)

=== Official Language ===
Assamese and English Language is used for and official purpose.

Languages of Lakhipur town (2011)
1. Bengali (50.4%)
2. Assamese (45.3%)
3. Hindi (3.60%)
4. Others (1.70%)

== Climate ==
Climate of Lakhipur is significant for excessive humidity, heat during summer becomes unbearable. Mostly after every hot day, there is huge possibility of rain in the evening. During rainy season, the air is surcharged with moisture and rainfall is extremely heavy. The winter is not so cold and the temperature dips to a minimum of around 12-13 degree Celsius. The rainy season starts early and continues up to October. The early monsoon is characterised by hailstorms.

== Lakhipur Municipal Board ==
Lakhipur town is divided into 10 wards. Lakhipur municipal board has total administration over 2,927 houses to which it supplies basic amenities like water and sewerage. It is also authorized to build roads within municipal board limits and impose taxes on properties coming under its jurisdiction.

== Politics ==
Lakhipur is a part of West Goalpara and Jaleswar Constituency in the assembly elections. Further it is a part of the Dhubri constituency for the general elections.

== Lakhipur Sub-Division ==
Lakhipur sub-division was declared on 26 January 2016 by the chief minister of the state Tarun Gogoi.

Lakhipur is connected to Jaleswar via road and further connected to Dhubri via river route. A number of villages, namely Jaleswarand Chunari lie on the surroundings of this sub-division. Lakhipur is connected to the district headquarters Goalpara via two roads, one passing through Ambari and the other passing through Baida, Rongsai.

The town is in the developing phase and has basic medical facilities provided by the Lakhipur Primary Health Centre. One of the oldest schools is the Lakhipur Higher Secondary School. The school is located in the heart of the town and has been providing the basic education since the British ages.

== Notable people ==
- Nagendra Narayan Choudhury was an Assamese short story writer and essayists from Assam.
