= Kharijapikon =

- Census town
- Location in Assam, India Kharijapikon (India)
- Coordinates: 26°02′14″N 90°37′03″E
- Country: India
- State: Assam
- District: Goalpara

Population (2001)
  - Total: 5,833

Languages
  - Official: Assamese
- Time zone: UTC+5:30 (IST)
- Vehicle registration: AS

Kharijapikon is a census town in Goalpara district in the Indian state of Assam.

== Demographics ==
As of 2001 India census, Kharijapikon had a population of 5833. Males constitute 57% of the population and females 43%. Kharijapikon has an average literacy rate of 73%, higher than the national average of 59.5%: male literacy is 80%, and female literacy is 64%. In Kharijapikon, 13% of the population is under 6 years of age.
