= Simlabari (Goalpara) =

Village in India

- Village
- Map of Assam Simlabari (India)
- Coordinates: 26.0792°N 90.4196°E
- Country: India
- State: Assam
- District: Goalpara
- Subdivision: Lakhipur

Area
  - Total: 247.35 ha (611.2 acres)
- Elevation: 30 m (98 ft)

Population (2011)
  - Total: 5,516
  - Density: 2,230/km^{2} (5,776/sq mi)

Languages
  - Official: Assamese
- Time zone: UTC+5:30 (IST)
- Postal code: 281869
- STD Code: 03624
- Vehicle registration: AS-18
- Census code: 304566

Simlabari is a village in Goalpara district, Assam, India. As per the 2011 Census of India, Simlabari village has a total population of 5,516 people including 2,798 males and 2,718 females with a literacy rate of 50.87%.
