= Kamalakanta Bhattacharya =

Kamalakanta Bhattacharya may refer to:

- Kamalakanta Bhattacharya (Assam) (1853–1936), Indian essayist and poet
- Kamalakanta Bhattacharya (West Bengal) or Sadhaka Kamalakanta (1769–1821), Bengali Shakta poet and yogi
