= Jatindra Nath Duwara =

Indian poet

- Born: 4 March 1892; Amolapatty, Sivasagar, Assam, British Raj
- Died: 5 July 1964 (aged 72); Sivasagar, Assam, India
- Occupation: Poet
- Writing career
- Language: Assamese
- Notable awards: Sahitya Akademi Award (1955)

Jatindra Nath Duwara (1892-1964) was a notable poet of the Jonaki era of Assamese literature. Duwara is known as Bonphulor kobi in the Assamese literacy society. He was the first writer awarded with Sahitya Akademi Award in 1955 for his poetry book "Bon Phul". He was the president of the Assam Sahitya Sabha, the premier literary organization of Assam in 1955 which was held at Guwahati.

== Short Biography ==
Duwara was born in Rangpur at Sivasagar district on 4 March 1892 to Shyamsundor Duwara and Punoyda Duwara. He had his early schooling at Sivasagar and then went to Calcutta for higher education. Duwara spent his whole life as unmarried. He died on 5 July 1964.

== Literary works ==
Some of his literary works include:

- Umor Titho (ওমৰ তীৰ্থ) - 1925
- Kotha Kobita (কথা কবিতা) - 1933
- Apun Sur (আপোন সুৰ) - 1938
- Bonphul (বনফুল) - 1952
- Milonor Soor (মিলনৰ সুৰ) - 1960
- Moromor Soor ( মৰমৰ সুৰ)

== See also ==
- Assamese literature
- List of people from Assam
- List of Asam Sahitya Sabha Presidents
- List of Assamese writers with their pen names
- List of Sahitya Akademi Award winners for Assamese
