= Nilmoni Phukan Sr =

Writer, poet

Nilmoni Phukan
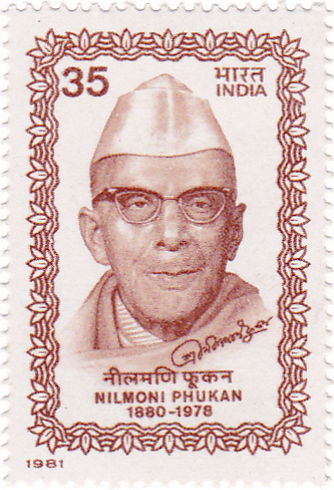
- Born: 22 June 1880; Dibrugarh district, Assam
- Died: 20 January 1978 (aged 97)
- Occupations: Writer, Poet, Politician

Nilmoni Phukan (1880–1978) was an Assamese writer, poet, freedom fighter and politician popularly known as Bagmibor in the Assamese literature. Since he shares his name with another Assamese poet, Nilmani Phukan, he is often referred as Nilmoni Phukan (Senior). Phukan was the president of the Asam Sahitya Sabha for two times; in 1944 held at Sivasagar district and in 1947 held at Dibrugarh district of Assam. He is known for his anti-Bengali utterances and crusade against its use in Assam.

== Early life and education ==
Phukan was born on 22 June 1880 at Dibrugarh district, Assam. He was the son of Lombodhar Phukan. After his early education at George's Institution, Dibrugarh and Cotton College, Guwahati, he passed the B.A. examination from Victoria College at Cooch Bihar (as a graduating student of the University of Calcutta), in 1907. After graduation, he decided to study law, but the course remained incomplete.

== Literary works ==
Phukan's literary works include:

- Jyotikona (জ্যোতিকণা) (1938),
- Sahiityakola (সাহিত্যকলা) (1940),
- Joya Tirtho (জয়াতীৰ্থ) (1941),
- Chintamoni (চিন্তামনি) (1942),
- Manashi (মানসী) (1943),
- Gutimali (গুটিমালী) (1950),
- Jinjiri (জিঞ্জিৰি) (1951),
- Mahapurusiya Dharma, Omitra (মহাপুৰুষীয়া ধৰ্ম, অমিত্ৰা) (1952),
- Xondhani (সন্ধানী) (1953),
- Xotodhara (শতধাৰা) (1962),
- Mormobani (মৰ্মবাণী) (1963),
- Aahuti (আহুতি),
- Torun Asom (তৰুণ অসম),
- Mora Dalot Kuhipaat (মৰা ডালত কুঁহিপাত) etc.

Phukan also worked as an editor in the Dainik Batori a short-lived daily newspaper, with Sivaprasad Barua for few times.

== Awards and recognitions ==
- A commemorative postage stamp had been created in the name of Bagmibar Nilamoni Phukan.
- Twice he became the President of Assam Sahitya Sabha

== See also ==
- Assamese literature
- List of people from Assam
- List of Asam Sahitya Sabha presidents
- List of Assamese-language poets
- List of Assamese writers with their pen names
