= Satyanath Borah =

Writer from Assam

- Born: Guwahati, Colonial Assam
- Writing career
- Pen name: Ejon Axomiya
- Language: Assamese

Satyanath Borah (1860–1925) was an Assamese grammarian, essayist and music composer. He wrote sometimes under the pen name of Ejon Asomiya. Borah participated in India's freedom struggle and also associated with the Jonaki and Usha magazine. He is the author of Gitawali, a book consisting of 28 modern Assamese song. Other literary works of Borah are Sarathi (The Guide or Charioteer, 1915), Kendra Sabha (1925), Chintakoli (Buds of thought, 1935) and Akash-rahasya (Mystery of the Sky), Jivanar omiya, His grammatical works include Bohol Byakoron, a book on the Assamese grammar.

== See also ==
- Assamese literature
- History of Assamese literature
- List of Assamese-language poets
- List of Assamese writers with their pen names
