= Yaatra =

Yaatra, The Journal of Assamese Literature and Culture is a literary magazine published by the North-East Foundation Guwahati, Assam, India, that aims to spread awareness on Assamese literature by publishing translations of Assamese literary works in English. The magazine was launched in 2005. Its founder and editor is Dhrubajyoti Bora. As of 2016 transgender activist Aruni Kashyap was an assistant editor.
