= Surya Kumar Bhuyan =

Indian writer and academic (1892–1964)

Rai Bahadur Surya Kumar Bhuyan MBE
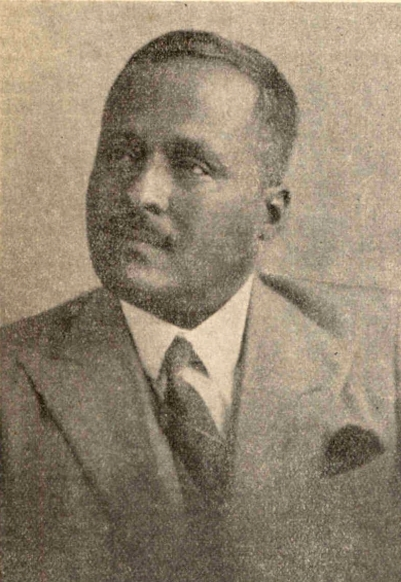
- Surya Kumar Bhuyan in 1938
- Born: 27 January 1892; Fauzdaripatty, Nagaon district, Assam
- Died: 5 July 1964 (aged 71–72); Fauzdaripatty, Nagaon, Assam, India
- Education: University of Calcutta; London University
- Occupations: Writer, Lecturer
- Writing career
- Pen name: Bhanunandan
- Language: Assamese
- Notable awards: Padma Shri

Rai Bahadur Surya Kumar Bhuyan MBE (1892–1964) was a writer, historian, educator, social activist, storyteller, essayist, professor and a poet from Assam. He has written many books on ancient history, stories, essays, biographies, etc. in the world of Assamese literature. He presided over the Asam Sahitya Sabha (1953) held at Shillong. He was the elected member of Rajya Sabha during 1952–53, and was awarded the Padma Shri by the Government of India in 1956.

== Early life and education ==
Bhuyan was born on 27 January 1892 to Rabilal Bhuyan and Bhubaneshwari Bhuyan at Fauzdaripatty, in Nagaon district, Assam. His mother died when he was young. His father's two brothers, Kankalal Bhuyan and Matilal Bhuyan, as well as Bhubaneshwari Bhuyan, died during the black fever of the late nineteenth century. Surya Kumar Bhuyan was raised by his grandmothers, Pahita and Labita. His father was the Chief District Magistrate of Nagaon district. He began his education at Nagaon but in 1904, moved to Shillong. He graduated from the Shillong Government School in 1909. In 1913, he completed his Bachelor of Arts degree in the Presidency College, Calcutta, and in 1916, completed his master's degree English in the Calcutta University.

== Career ==
He started his career as a teacher in Jorhat Mission School. In 1918, he was appointed as a lecturer in Cotton College at Guwahati. In 1936, Bhuyan went to England to work on his PhD at the London School of Oriental and African Studies. Bhuyan became the first Assamese to be the Principal of the Cotton College, Guwahati. After which, Bhuyan began to resuscitate the Buranjis and formulate a distinct past for Assam, against its inclusion within the framework of the Indian state. In this, he continued the work of Sir Edward Gait, collecting historical manuscripts from old families and converting them into a readable format. Bhuyan served as the second President of the Governing Body of Nowgong College. He retired as the DPI Assam and took charge as the Vice Chancellor of Gauhati University.

== Personal life ==
Surya Kumar Bhuyan married Laksheshwari Bhuyan on 14 February 1917. They had six children.

== Literary works ==
Surya Kumar Bhuyan compiled, collated, and edited a number of books and articles in the Assamese language. He also wrote a few books in English and Bengali, which include:

=== Historical books ===
- Assam Buranji by Harakanta Barua; 1930
- Kamrupar Buranji (কামৰূপৰ বুৰঞ্জী; 1930)
- Deodhai Assam Buranji (দেওধাই অসম বুৰঞ্জী; 1932)
- Assamar Padya Buranji (অসমৰ পদ্য বুৰঞ্জী; 1933)
- Padshah Buranji (পাদছাহ বুৰঞ্জী; 1935, 2009)
- Kachari Buranji (কছাৰী বুৰঞ্জী; 1936)
- Jayantia Buranji (জয়ন্তীয়া বুৰঞ্জী;1937)
- Tripura Buranji (ত্ৰিপুৰা বুৰঞ্জী; 1938)
- Assam Buranji, S.M with an Analysis in English.1945
- Konwar Bidroh (কোঁৱৰ বিদ্ৰোহ; 1948)
- Mirjumlar Asom Akramon (মিৰজুমলাৰ অসম আক্ৰমণ; 1956)
- Satsari Assam Buranji (সাতসৰী অসম বুৰঞ্জী; 1960, 2009)

=== Biographical works in Assamese ===
- Gopal Krishna Gokhale (গোপাল কৃষ্ণ গোখলে; 1916) (Incorporated in jivani sahitya)
- Ahomar Din (আহোমৰ দিন; 1918)
- Rabindranath Tagore (ৰবীন্দ্ৰ নাথ ঠাকুৰ; 1920, 2007) (Incorporated in Jivani Sahitya)
- Anundoram Borooah, Sanskritist (আনন্দৰাম বৰুৱা; 1920,1924,1956, 2007)
- Jonaki, lives of eminent men (জোনাকী; 1928,1938, 2007)
- Chaneki, lives of eminent women (চানেকী; 1928, 2006)
- Asam Jiyari, Assamese women of history (অসম জীয়ৰী; 1935, 2007)
- Swargadew Rajeswar Singha (ৰাজেশ্বৰ সিংহ; 1751-1769,1975, 2005)
- Ramoni Gabharu (ৰমনী গাভৰু; 1951)
- Swargadeu Godadhor Singha (স্বৰ্গদেউ গদাধৰ সিংহ)
- Anandaram Dhekial Phukan (আনন্দৰাম ঢেকীয়াল ফুকন)
- Jagannath Barua (জগন্নাথ বৰুৱা)
- Sir Edward Gait (চাৰ এডৱাৰ্ড গেইট) etc.

=== Creative works in Assamese ===
- Nirmali (নিৰ্মালি; 1918) (collection of poems) (Incorporated in Kavita Sangraha)
- Panchami (পঞ্চমী; 1927) (short story collection)
- Tripadi (ত্ৰিপদী; 1959,2010) (collection of articles written on literature)
- Jaimati Upakhyan (জয়মতী উপাখ্যান;1920,1954) (Poem)

=== Books in English ===
- An Assamese Nur Jahan, Queen Phuleswari Devi (1926)
- Tungkhungia Buranji (1932)
- Assamese Historical Literature
- Kartuya
- An Account of Assam
- Preliminary Report on the Agency Records of the Assam Government, 1823-1874
- Lachit Barphukan and his times
- Annals of the Delhi Badshahate, 1947
- Anglo Assamese Relations (Thesis approved for the Ph D Degree of London University) (1949, 1999, 2008)
- Seven Hindrances (1953) (Incorporated in some Literary Reminiscences)
- Atan Buragohain and his times (1937)
- Studies in the Literature of Assam (1937, 1956,1962,1986)
- Catalogue of Historical writings (1955)
- Report and Conspectus of the Assam Research Society
- Early British Relations with Assam.1928
- Printed in Assam Secretariat Office file.1930-31
- Bulletins of the Department of Historical and Antiquarian Studies in Assam, Nos I, II and III, V, 1932–36
- Assamese Literature: Ancient and Modern.Printed in Assam Secretariat Office file.1936 Incorporated in studies in literature of Assam
- Dr. Francis Hamiltons's Account of Assam. 1940
- Military System of the Assamese People. Prativa Devi Memorial Lectures, Fourth Series.1941,2010
- Some Literary Reminiscences. 1954,2010
- Quintessence of Experience. 1986,2010
- Studies in the History of Assam. 1986, 2009
- London Memories. 1979
- An Assamese Miscellany.2012
- Recollection and Reflection. 2010
- Men I Have Met.1962, 2010
- Copper Plate and stone Inscriptions of Ancient and Medieval Assam.2010
- Two German Articles on Assam Edited. 2010
- Assam in the Eighteenth Century Edited.2012
- Two Years in Parliament. 2010

=== Books in Bengali ===
- Bangla Vashai Oxomor Itihaas (বাংলা ভাষায় আসামেৰ ইতিহাস)
- Obosane Ahom Rajotwo (অবসানে আহোম ৰাজত্ব)
- Kabyoroshik Boiganiker Atmochorit (কাব্যৰসিক বৈজ্ঞানিকেৰে আত্মচৰিত)
- Europot Oxomor Jyotish Sutro (য়ুৰোপত অসমৰ জ্যোতিষ সূত্ৰ)

== Awards ==
- Padma Shri award, the fourth-highest civilian award from the Government of India in the field of Literature and Education in 1956.
- Rai Bahadur, the title honored by the ruling British government in 1933.
- Member of the Order of the British Empire (MBE) in the 1946 Birthday Honours.

== Death ==
Dr. Surya Kumar Bhuyan died on 5 July 1964 at the American Baptist Mission Hospital in Chhatribari of America. At the time of demise, he left his wife Laksheshwari Bhuyan, three sons and three daughters and a few grandchildren.

== See also ==
- Assamese literature
- List of people from Assam
- List of Asam Sahitya Sabha presidents
- List of Assamese writers with their pen names
