= Raghunath Choudhary =

Indian independence activist and writer

- Born: 1879; Lawpara village, Undivided Kamrup District (present Nalbari district), Assam
- Died: 18 November 1967 (aged 87–88)
- Occupations: Writer; poet
- Writing career
- Pen name: Bihogi kobi
- Language: Assamese
- Notable works: Xaadori; Jonaki (magazine)

Raghunath Choudhary (1879 – 18 November 1967) was an Indian writer of the Jonaki era or the romantic era of Assamese literature. Choudhary is known as Bihogi Kobi (poet of birds) because most of his writings are based on birds and nature. Choudhary also took part in the Indian independence movement and was imprisoned by the British for the same. He was the president of Tezpur session of Asam Sahitya Sabha in 1936. Kamrup Sanjeevani Sabha conferred him with the title Kabiratna.

== Short biography ==
He was born in Lawpara village in Undivided Kamrup district (present Nalbari district) in the year 1879. He had his early schooling at Guwahati. He died on 18 November 1967.

== Literary career ==
Choudhary's first poem was published in Jonaki magazine. He used Sanskrit and Arabic in his literary works.

His other works includes: Amongst all his first literary work was Xaadori in 1910.

Poetry books

1. Xaadori (1910)
2. Keteki (1918)
3. Kaarbala (1923)
4. Dohikatara (1931)
5. Navamallika (1958)
6. Gulap

As a magazines editor

1. Jayanti (1936–38),
2. Surabhi (1940, 1942–44),
3. Moina, a children's magazine (1923),
4. Jonaki (Sub-editor)

== See also ==
- Assamese literature
- List of people from Assam
- List of Asam Sahitya Sabha presidents
- List of Assamese writers with their pen names
