= Robin Dey =

Indian writer

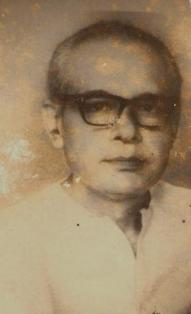
- Born: 18 March 1922; Nazira, Sibsagar, Assam
- Died: 22 July 1980 (aged 58)
- Education: Scottish Church College
- Occupation: Novelist

Robin Dey (18 March 1922 – 22 July 1980) was an Indian thriller novelist and actor from Assam. He wrote Dasyu Bhaskar series and Paban series. Dasyu Bhaskar series included 62 books and the first book was titled Dasyu Bhaskarar Abirbhab (Appearance of Dasyu Bhaskar) in Assamese language which became popular among the readers in the seventies and eighties. Rongmon was a pseudonym or pen-name of Robin Dey. Porasor is sobriquet of Dey. He was also an actor.

== Career ==
Robin Dey was born in a Bengali family near the Dikhow river in Nazira of Sibsagar district of Assam on 18 March 1922. He studied in Nazira and at the Scottish Church College at the University of Calcutta. He had completed his matriculation in 1943 and then left for Calcutta for higher education and continued his work in Assamese literature as an Assamese proof reader for the magazine "Soviet Desh". Dey died on 22 July 1980.

== Literary works ==
Apart from the Dasyu Bhaskar novels, Rongmon had also written several other children's novels namely Daku, Paban Konwar and Parbatar Ringoni. His social novel Nipator pat was serially published in Assamese magazine Amar pratinidhi and remained incomplete.

== Bibliography ==
Dasyu Bhaskar Series

1. Dasyu Bhaskarar Abirbhab (Appearance of Dasyu Bhaskar)
2. Guha Manav Bhaskar (Cave Dweller Bhaskar)
3. Chakravedi Bhaskar
4. Biman Judhot Bhaskar (Bhaskar in Aerial Fight)
5. Dasyu Bhaskar Antardhyaan (Disappearance of Dasyu Bhaskar)
6. Dasyu Bhaskar aru Adrishya Danaav (Dasyu Bhaskar and the Invisible Monster)
7. Asthir Seemant aru Dasyu Bhaskar (Unquiet Frontier and Dasyu Bhaskar)
8. Bhaskaror Pratigya Puran(Bhaskar Fulfills His Promise)
9. Kshemahin Bhaskar (Merciless Bhaskar)
10. Bondhu Bhaskar (Bhaskar the Friend)
11. Juliba Paarot Bhaskar (Bhaskar on the Banks of Juliba)
12. Bhaskaror Krodhbhori (Bhaskar's Anger)
13. Noroghatak Bhaskar (Bhaskar the Killer)
14. Dasyu Bhaskar aru Mantripatan (Dasyu Bhaskar and the Fall of a Minister)
15. Dasyu Bhaskar aru Mrityudoot (Dasyu Bhaskar and Angel of Death)
16. Commando Neta Bhaskar (Commando Leader Bhaskar)
17. Dasyu Bhaskar aru Rani Hindool (Dasyu Bhaskar and Queen Hindool)
18. Bhaskaror Agnibaan (Bhaskar's Rocket)
19. Jaadukar Bhaskar (Bhaskar the Magician)
20. Bhaskar aru Luit Kanya (Bhaskar and the Girl from Luit)
21. Bhaskaror Samudravijaay (Bhaskar's Sea Victory)
22. Bhaskar aru Mahakaal (Bhaskar and Mahakaal)
23. Bhaskar aru Cabin No 22 ( Bhaskar and Cabin No 22)
24. Dasyu Bhaskar aru Shilajtu (Dasyu Bhaskar and Shilajtu)
25. Bhaskar aru Sarpasannyasi (Bhaskar and the Snake-worshipper)
26. Dasyu Bhaskar aru Mishawrkumari (Dasyu Bhaskar and the Princess of Egypt)
27. Dasyu Bhaskar aru Ratnamala (Dasyu Bhaskar and the Necklace)
28. Bahurupi Bhaskar (Multifaceted Bhaskar)
29. Agniborna Bhaskar (Fiery Bhaskar)
30. Bhaskar aru Bimaandasyu (Bhaskar and the Flight Pirates)
31. Bhaskar aru Maharaaj (Bhaskar and the Emperor)
32. Dasyu Bhaskar aru Hippie (Dasyu Bhaskar and the Hippie)
33. Bandi Bhaskar - First (Prisoner Bhaskar - Part One)
34. Bandi Bhaskar - Second (Prisoner Bhaskar - Part Two)
35. Bhaskar aru Rakshasi Sinai (Bhaskar and the Monstrous Sinai)
36. Dasyu Bhaskar aru Pedapatti
37. Dasyu Bhaskar aru Pretaatmaa (Bhaskar and the Ghost)
38. Dasyu Bhaskar aru Aakaal (Bhaskar and the Famine)
39. Bhaskar aru Sagaar Raja (Bhaskar and the King of Seas)
40. Bhaskar aru Minoti (Bhaskar and Minoti)
41. Bhaskar aru Abhinetri (Bhaskar and the Actress)
42. Adhivakta Bhaskar (Advocate Bhaskar)
43. Bhaskar aru Champaa (Bhaskar and Champaa)
44. Bhaskaror Verakuti (Bhaskar's Prank)
45. Bhaskar aru Kuntilaal (Bhaskar and Kuntilaal)
46. Moromi Bhaskar (Loving Bhaskar)
47. Jiya Juit Bhaskar (Bhaskar in Live Fire)
48. Bhaskar Bihone Champaa (Champaa Without Bhaskar)
49. Bhaskar aru Double Agent (Bhaskar and the Double Agent)
50. Bhaskar aru Sadmaveshi Smuggler (Bhaskar and the Disguised Smugglers)
51. Bhaskar aru Snapdragon(Bhaskar and the Snapdragon)
52. Jantrayuddhat Bhaskar (Bhaskar in Machine War)
53. Durjoy Boiri Bhaskar (Bhaskar the Undefeatable Foe)
54. Bhaskar aru Yuvaraaj (Bhaskar and Prince)
55. Bhaskar aru Nishaad (Bhaskar and Nishaad)
56. Bhaskar aru Heruya Sutra (Bhaskar and the Missing Link)
57. Bhaskar aru Marushiyaal (Bhaskar and the Desert Fox)
58. Bhaskar aru Rudrapati (Bhaskar and Rudrapati)
59. Bhaskar aru Dui Bodmaash (Bhaskar and the Two Punks)
60. Bhaskar aru Sadmaveshi Shaitaan (Bhaskar and the Disguised Satan)
61. Giriramot Bhaskar (Bhaskar in Giriram )

Non Series Novels

- Daku - About the friendship between two boys and a dog named Daku in an Assamese village.

== See also ==
- Assamese literature
- History of Assamese literature
- List of Assamese-language poets
- List of Assamese writers with their pen names
- Archive of Bhaskar Series in National Library, Govt. of India, Kolkata
- List of Bhaskar series Novels.
- Dashyu Bhaskar Fan club in Facebook
