= Mahim Bora =

Indian writer and educationist (1924–2016)

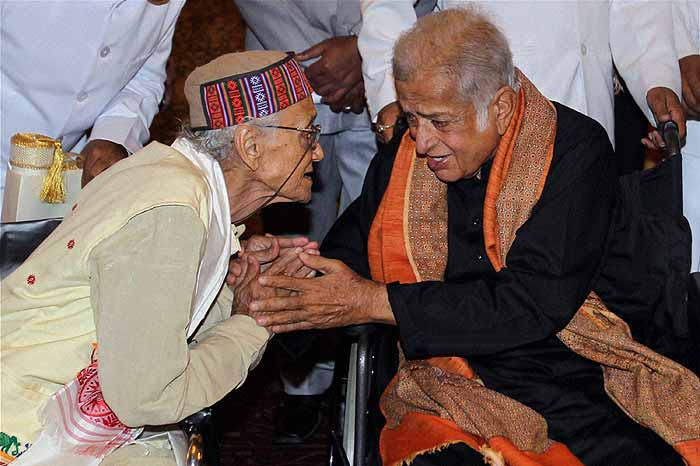
- Mahim Bora with legendary actor Shashi Kapoor at padma awards 2011.
- Born: 6 July 1924; Sonitpur district, Assam, British Raj
- Died: 5 August 2016 (aged 92); Guwahati, India
- Education: M.A. in Assamese from Gauhati University
- Occupations: Writer, critic, poet
- Spouse: Lt.Mrs.Dipti Rekha Bora
- Writing career
- Language: Assamese
- Genre: Assamese
- Subject: Literature
- Notable works: Edhani mahir hanhi, Kathanibari ghat
- Notable awards: Padma Shri and Sahitya Akademi Award

Mahim Bora (6 July 1924 – 5 August 2016) was a prominent Indian writer and educationist from Assam. His notable works include "Kathonibari Ghat," a collection of short stories, and "Edhani Mahir Hanhi," a novel. He was elected as a president of the Assam Sahitya Sabha held in 1989 at Doomdooma. He was awarded most notably the Padma Shri in 2011, the Sahitya Akademi Award in 2001 and the Assam Valley Literary Award in 1998. Assam Sahitya Sabha conferred its highest honorary title Sahityacharyya on him in 2007. He also participated in the Quit India Movement of 1942 held in Kaliabor town in the Nagaon district of Assam.

== Early life ==
Mahim Bora was born on 6 July 1924 in Ghopesadharu, a tea estate in Sonitpur district. He spent his childhood in his home village Ramtamuli Chuk, Hatbar.

He did his primary schooling at Primary Hatbar L.P. School, Hatbar M.E. Kuwarital Combined M.V. School. He passed Matriculation at Kaliabar Government aided High School and did Intermediate at Nowgong College, Nagaon (Assam) in 1946. He received B.A. from Cotton College, Guwahati (Assam) and M.A. in Assamese literature from Guwahati University, Guwahati.

After taking his M.A. degree he first joined service as a teacher at Kaliabar H.E.School, Nagaon & Kamrup Academy, Guwahati. He was assistant editor of Rangghar Children Magazine (now defunct) and also worked as conductor of Gaonlia Raijole in All India Radio, Guwahati. He later joined as an Assamese lecturer in J.B.College, Jorhat (Assam), and lastly he shifted to Nowgong College, Nagaon permanently and retired as Head of the Assamese Department. He was also the founder lecturer of A.D.P. college and Girl's college Nagaon.

== Achievements ==
He was President of Nowgong District Sahitya Sabha, Assam Sahitya Sabha:Kavi Sanmilan (1978) and Assam Sahitya Sabha (1989–90).

== Later life ==
He married Dipti Rekha Hazarika of Jamuguri on 1 May 1957. He was father of two sons. His wife died on 20 Jan of 1999. His younger son Lt. Dr. Abhijit Bora died in 2005. He died on 5 August 2016 in a private hospital of Guwahati at the age of 93. He was cremated with full State honours in Nagaon.

== Literary works ==
Bora's chief anthology of poems was Rangajiya (The Red Dragon-fly, 1978). In his short stories, he was an observer of folk and rural situations. He was a regular contributor of short stories to various periodicals.

=== Short story collections ===
- Kathanibari Ghat (1961),
- Deha Garaka Prem (1967),
- Moi Pipali Aru Puja (1967),
- Bahubhuji Tribhuj (1967),
- Akhan Nadir Mrityu (1972),
- Rati Phula Phul (1977),
- Borjatri (1980),
- Mor Priya Galpa (1987) and

=== Essay collections ===
- Chinta Bichitra (1989),
- Sahitya Bichitra (1989),

=== Novels ===
- Herua Digantar Maya (1972),
- Edhani Mahir Hanhi (2001),
- Banduli Phular Rang (2007) and
- Putala Ghar (1973)

=== Children's literature ===
- Batris Putalar Sadhu (1976) and
- Tezimala Aru Cindarela (2007)

=== Translations ===
- Raja Rammohan Ray

=== Edited works ===
- Sankardevar Nat (1989)

=== Poetry collections ===
- Ranga Jia (1978),
- Jonamanir hanhi;

=== Radio plays ===
- Laru Gopalar Prem,
- Laru Gopalar Bibah,
- Laru Gopalar Ghar-Sansar,
- Padum Kunwari (1951),
- Nirmal Bhakat (1951),
- Pansha Sar,
- Garakhia Bhim (1951),
- Tinir Tini Gal,
- Tup,
- Mas aru Manuh,
- Batar Akosh Bagari Edited by T. Goswami,
- Momair podulit bandhilu ghura,
- 'Pakhi Loga Din' edited by G.C. Das,
- Pabandha Bisitra edited by G.C.Das.

== Awards ==
- Padma Shri award in 2011 in the field of Literature and Education by the Government of India
- Sahitya Akademi Award (for Assamese) in 2001 for his novel Edhani Mahir Hahi.
- Assam Valley Literary Award (1998)
- Chhaganlal Jain award for his collection of stories Galpa Samagra in 1966 .
- Assam Publication Board literary award

for Rati PhuLa Phul in 1980.

- Ganesh Gogoi Award in 2015.
- Sahityacharyya honour in 2007.

== See also ==
- List of Indian poets
- Assamese literature
- List of Asam Sahitya Sabha presidents
- List of Assamese-language poets
- List of Assamese writers with their pen names
