= Chandra Kumar Agarwala =

Indian poet and writer (1867–1938)

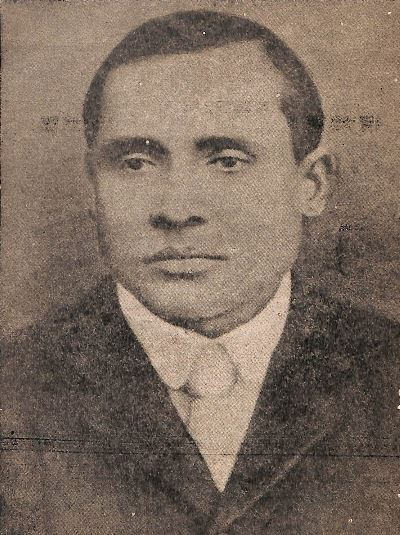
- Born: 28 November 1867; Brahmajan, Bengal Presidency, British India
- Died: 2 March 1938 (aged 70); Guwahati, Assam, British India
- Writing career
- Language: Assamese

Chandra Kumar Agarwala (28 November 1867 – 2 March 1938) was a writer, poet, journalist from Assam. He is a pioneer of the Jonaki Era, the age of romanticism of Assamese literature. Agarwala was titled as Pratimar Khonikor in Assamese literature. Agarwala was the first editor and financer of the Jonaki magazine and a founder member of Asamiya Bhasa Unnati Sadhini Sabha, a literary organization of Assam with his intimate friends Lakshminath Bezbarua and Hemchandra Goswami. Agarwala, along with his friend Lakshminath and Hemchandra, are known as "Trimurti of Assamese literature" for their remarkable contribution to the very beginning of modern Assamese literature. Chandra Kumar Agarwala was the brother of writer and poet Ananda Chandra Agarwala and uncle of Jyoti Prasad Agarwala, a noted poet, playwright, composer, lyricist, writer and first Assamese Filmmaker.

== Early life and education ==
Chandra Kumar Agarwala was born at Brahmajan near Gohpur in Sonitpur district on 28 October 1867. He was the second son of Haribilash Agarwala (1842-1916). He came from a rich business family of Assam. Chandra Kumar started his education at Tezpur. After passing FA, he took admission into the BA classes of the same college, but returned home, without completing his BA.

== Literacy works ==
Some of his poetry books are:

- Bon kunwori(1st assamese romantic poem)
- Pratima (প্ৰতিমা) (1914),
- Bin-boragi (বীণবৰাগী) (1923),
- Chandramrit (চন্দ্ৰামৃত)(1967)

== Death ==
Chandra Kumar Agarwala died on 2 March 1938 at his house at Uzan Bazaar in Guwahati, Assam.

== See also ==
- List of Indian poets
- Assamese literature
- History of Assamese literature
- List of Assamese-language poets
- List of Assamese writers with their pen names
