= Ananda Chandra Agarwala =

Indian writer, poet, historian and administrative officer (1874–1940)

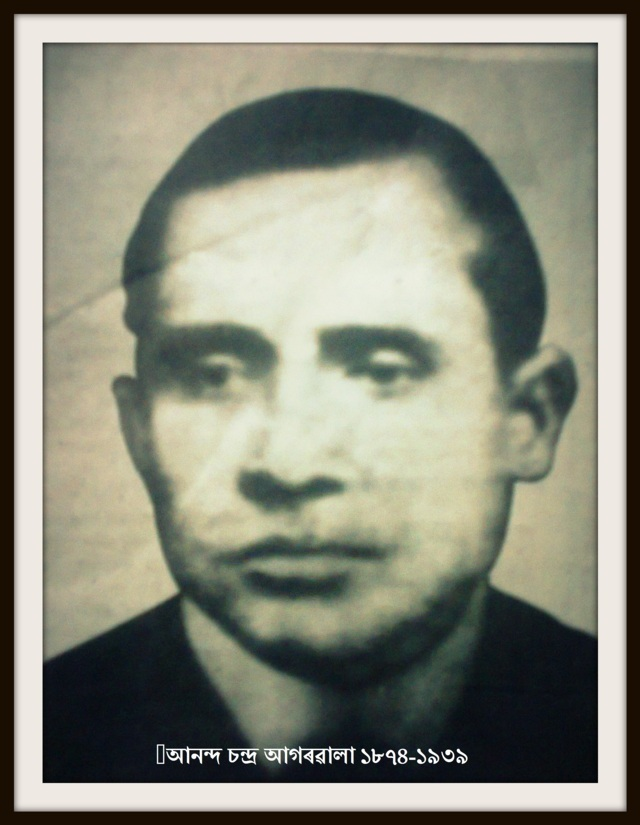
- Born: 5 September 1874; Borngabari, Gohpur, Biswanath, Assam
- Died: 1940 (aged 65–66)
- Occupations: writer, poet, historian, translator, administrative officer

Ananda Chandra Agarwala (1874–1940) was a writer, poet, historian, translator and administrative officer from Biswanath District of Assam. He is known as Bhangoni Kunwor for his translation of several English poems into Assamese. He was elected as a president of the Asam Sahitya Sabha in 1934 held at Mangaldoi. He was honoured with the title of Rai Bahadur by the ruling British Government. Ananda Chandra Agarwala was the brother of noted Assamese poet Chandra Kumar Agarwala and uncle of Jyoti Prasad Agarwala, a poet, playwright, composer, lyricist, writer and first Assamese Filmmaker.

== Literary life and life ==
Ananda Chandra Agarwal grew up in a cultural and intellectual environment, and his mother’s influence on his life was immense.

Ananda Chandra Agarwal’s first published collection of poems was called Jilikani. Agarwal, who continued to beautify the original in the translation of foreign poetry, is known as "Bhangani lllKonwar" in Assamese poetry literature. There is no comparison of the poems broken by Agarwala, who occupied a distinct place in Assamese poetry and literary world as a Bhangani Konwar. He broke the poems by applying pure Assamese language without damaging the beauty of the original poem. His first collection of poems, Jilikani, also included several broken poems.

After taking over as president at the Mangaldai session of Assam Sahitya Sabha in addition to the president’s address given to Ananda Chandra Agarwal as president in 1934, the spiritual articles are written by him, the rules of Assamese letter alliance, etc., are currently considered as the national treasures of Assamese. Agarwala performed his duty in different parts of Assam including Silchar, Guwahati, Dibrugarh, etc., while working in police department, wrote a book in English in 1906 on the law and regulations of the police called Police Manual.

Two textbooks written by Agarwala are soft texts published in 1910 and original texts published in 1920. These two important books are used today to learn Assamese languages.

== Literary works ==
Poetry book:

- Jilikoni,

Historical books

- An Account of Assam
- Goalparar Purani Bibaran
- Aspects of history and culture

Text books:

- Kumal Path
- Adi Path.

Others:

- Police Manual (1906)

== See also ==
- Assamese literature
- History of Assamese literature
- List of Asam Sahitya Sabha presidents
- List of Assamese-language poets
- List of Assamese writers with their pen names
- Dev Library
