= Benudhar Sharma =

Indian writer

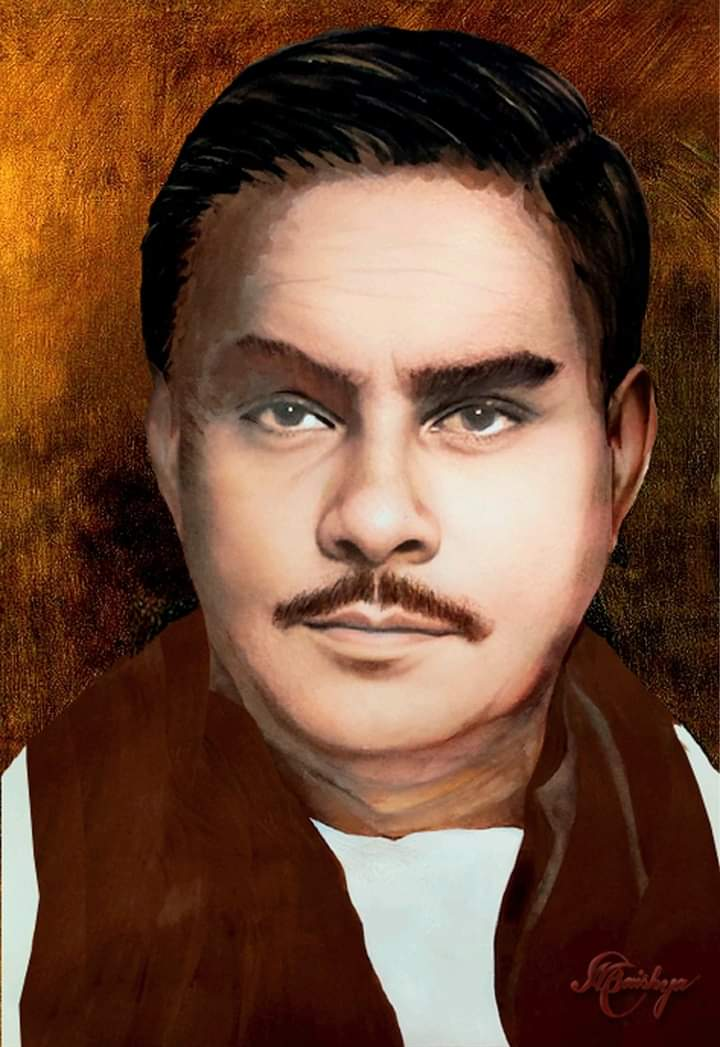
- Born: 16 November 1894; Charing, Sibasagar, Assam
- Died: 26 February 1981 (aged 86)
- Occupations: Writer; journalist; social activist
- Writing career
- Language: Assamese
- Notable awards: Sahitya Akademi Award (1960); Padma Bhushan (posthumously)

Benudhar Sharma (Beṇudhar Śarmmā, 1894–1981) was a noted writer, translator, journalist, historical researcher, and freedom fighter from Assam. He was a recipient of the civilian honour of the Padma Bhushan and was the second Assamese writer who won the Sahitya Akademi Award. He was the president of the Assam Sahitya Sabha in 1956.

== Literacy works ==
Published Assamese books
* ৰবিনচন ক্ৰূচ	Robinson Cruse	1918
* কংগ্ৰছ গাইড	Congress guide	1926
* জৱহৰলাল নেহেৰুৰ জীৱনী	Jawaharlal Neherur Jiwoni	1935
* ৰাংপতা	Rangpata	1943
* মঙ্গলতিৰ কণ্ঠমালা	Mongolotir Konthomala	1946
* সাতাৱন ছাল	Satawan Saal	1946
* গঙ্গাগোবিন্দ ফুকন	Gangagoninda Phukan	1950
* মণিৰাম দেৱান	Maniram Dewan	1950
* বেজবৰুৱাৰ ধনঞ্জয় বায়ু	Bejbaruar Dhananjay Baioo	–
* অসম দেশ	Asom Desh	–
* হাড় কাটোনৰ দেশ	Harh Katunor Desh	–
* অসমত সোণ কমোৱা ব্যৱসায়	Asomot sun komua byebosai	–
* অসমীয়া লো আৰু হিলৈ	Asmoiya Lu are Hiloi	–
* অসমীয়া টাইপ ৰাইটাৰ	Asmoiya type writer	–
* কটকী চৰিত্ৰ	Kotoki Charitra	–
* অসমীয়া চাহৰ গুৰি কথা	Asmoiya Chahor guri Kotha	–
* অসমত ইছলামৰ সূত্ৰপাত	Asmot Islamor Sutrapaat	–
* দূৰবীণ	Durbin	1951
* অসম সাহিত্য সভাৰ বুৰঞ্জী শাখাৰ অভিভাষণ	Asom Sahityo Sobhar Buranji Sakhar Abibhason	1953
* কংগ্ৰছৰ কাঁচিয়ালি ৰ'দত	Congressor Kasiyali Rodot	1959
* লাতুমণি	Latumoni	1959
* দুনৰি	Dunori	1959
* অৰ্ঘ্যাৱলী	Arghyawali	1967
* অসম বুৰঞ্জীৰ উপকৰণ	Asom Buranjir Upokoron	–
* মোগল খেদাৰ আখৰা	Mugal Khedar Akhora	–
* তুৰ্বক সেনাৰ প্ৰেতাত্মা	Turbok Senar Pretatma	–
* গদাধৰ সিংহৰ ব্ৰহ্মোত্তৰ দান	Godadhor Singhar Brahmuttor Daan	–
* লাচিত বৰফুকৰনৰ প্ৰশস্তি প্ৰস্তৰ	Lachit Borphukonor Prasasti Prostor	–
* দেশদ্ৰোহী কোন বদন নে পূৰ্ণানন্দ ?	Deshdrohi Kun Badan Ne Purnananda ?	–
* বুৰঞ্জীৰ মৰণোত্তৰ পৰীক্ষা জয়মতী কুঁৱৰী	Buranjir Morunottor Porikhya Jaimoti Kunwori	–
* আহোমৰ দিনৰ বিদ্যা	Ahomor Dinor Biya	–
* বয়সে মানুহক বুঢ়া নকৰে	Boyose Manuhok Burha Nokore	–
* বাগিচা চাহাবৰ প্ৰকৃতি	Bagisa Sahabor Prokriti	–
* দক্ষিণপাট সত্ৰ	Dakhinpat Sattra	1968
* ফুল চন্দন	Phul Chandan	1968
* মৰমৰ কাৰেং	Moromor Kareng	1968
* চটাই-চ'ৰাৰ কথা	Sotai Sorar Kotha	1969
* হেমচন্দ্ৰ গোস্বামীৰ ৰচনাৱলী	Hemchandra Goswamir Rosonawali	1971
* হেমচন্দ্ৰ গোস্বামীৰ জীৱনী	Hemchandra Goswamir Jiwoni	1971
* মণিৰাম দেৱানৰ গীত	Maniram Dewanor Geet	1976
* বিহু সম্ভাষণ	Bihu Sombhason	–
* বিহু আৰু হুঁচৰি	Bihu Aru Husori	–
* বহাগ বিহুৰ বৈশিষ্ট্য	Bohag Bihur Boisistha	–
* বিহুৰ পুৰণি জিলিঙণি	Bihur Puroni Jilingoni	–
* সেই বুৰঞ্জী প্ৰসিদ্ধ ৰঙালী বিহুতে	Sei Buranji Prasiddha Rangali Bihute	–
* বুৰঞ্জীৰ মৌ কোঁহ	Buranjir Mou Kuh	–
* অসমত ফিৰিঙি	Asomot Firingi	–

English-language books
* Rebellion of 1857	–
* Vis-à-vis Assam	1957
* Wadis Account of Assam	1927
