= Ambikagiri Raichoudhury =

Assamese writer and poet (1885–1967)

- Born: 18 December 1885; Barpeta, Assam
- Died: 2 January 1967 (aged 81)
- Occupations: Poet, writer
- Writing career
- Language: Assamese
- Genre: Assamese literature
- Notable awards: Sahitya Akademi Award(1965)

Ambikagiri Raichoudhury (1885–1967) was an Assamese poet, lyricist, singer, powerful prose writer, news worker, magazine editor, patriotic, social-worker and the leading freedom fighter of India's freedom struggle. He is known as Assam Kesari. He was elected president of the Asam Sahitya Sabha in 1950 of Margherita session.

== Early life ==
Raichoudhory was born in the famous Raichoudhury family of Barpeta. His father was Krishnaram Raichowdhury and his mother was Devika Devi. After his primary education in Barpeta, he studied in class VIII of high English school in Guwahati. Then he joined the Swadeshi Movement and social development work from 1904 to 1905 by. He, along with a few other youths, students and formed a British Opposition Anarchist team during this period. As a result, the British government captured Ambikagiri in Barpeta from 1908 to 1915.

== Political and social life ==
Raichoudhury was a poet, playwright and patriot all rolled in one. He took part in the Independence Movement for India and was imprisoned by the British for the same. He was the founder of "Asom Songrokhini Sobhaa" (Assam Preservation Council) and "Axom Jaatiyo Mohasobhaa". In his time in Barpeta, Raichoudhury avoided political activities and looked at the social life of Barpeta and insinuated in some social organization and literary-cultural activities. Among them were the formation of funds to facilitate the reading of poor students, the "Sankardeva Sarcharkas(শংকৰদেৱ চাৰ্কাচ)" organization, encouraging people to talk Assamese folk songs etc. He also greatly took a great effort to erase the effects of Bengali Yatra Naat (বঙলা যাত্ৰা নাট) from the social life of Barpeta. In 1915, Raichoudhury went to Dibrugarh and works as a typist of Railway Department, music teacher, etc. as well as the literary editor of the literary magazine Assam Bandhva (অসম বান্ধৱ) with Harekrishna Das. In the days that followed, most of his social and political thinking was published as an editorial in the Chetanaa (চেতনা) that he himself had published. In his experience of the punishment suffered in the prison during the non-co-operation movement, he composed songs of the struggle for freedom such as

- Toi Bhangibo lagibo shil(তই ভাঙিব লাগিব শিল)
- Dhar Jharu Dhar Bhai (ধৰ ঝাৰু ধৰ ভাই)
- Ki Dekhebi Bhay Karagar(কি দেখাবি ভয় কাৰাগাৰ)

which greatly instills a lot of support to other fighters. Raichoudhury was jailed again in the 1930 movement. He was appointed 'Detector' for the organizational work of the Congress at that time. On the political side, he came to be a very patriotic follower of Mahatma Gandhi.

In which case the congress leaders wanted to pressure Assamese caste from various aspects during the agitation, the encroachment of Pamua (পমুৱা) on the farm land of Assam; in view of the future of Assam and Assamese, Raichoudhury established "Assamese Rights and Interests Conservation Meeting (অসমীয়াৰ অধিকাৰ আৰু স্বাৰ্থ সংৰক্ষণী সভা)", Assam Jatiya Mahasabha (অসম জাতীয় মহাসভা), and "Assam Shiksha Prachar Samiti (অসম শিক্ষা প্ৰচাৰ সমিতি)" to protect the dignity of Assamese. Raichoudhury himself took care to show Assamese society the path of self-establishment economically by opening the "Swadeshi Kinok Sangha (স্বদেশী কিনক সংঘ)" and establishing a business company called "Mayabini Chemical Works (মায়াবিনী কেমিকেল ৱৰ্কছ)". He had also published books like 'Deka-Dekarir Veda (ডেকা-ডেকেৰীৰ বেদ)', 'Ahuti (আহুতি)' to reveal his doctrine among the people. In 1946-47, during the fear of including Assam to Pakistan, 'Assam Self-Defense Force' created by Assamese Hindu-Muslim united efforts, protesting against the formation of constituencies, declared a resolution to go on hunger strike.

== Literary life ==
Raichoudhury published poetry books called 'Tumi (তুমি)' in 1915 and 'Beena (বীণা)' in 1916. In 1918, in collaboration with Chandranath Sharma, he came out with a monthly magazine called ' Chetana(চেতনা)'. He discussed in the writings of 'Chetna' the freedom movement, non-cooperation, the place of violence and non-violence in politics, various problems at home and abroad, as well as the national problems of Assam etc. He wrote a patriotic drama named Bandini Bharat (বন্দিণী ভাৰত) the script of which was intercepted by British Police in 1906. After which Raichoudhary was put under police vigilance for about 8 years until 1915. During the 1921 'The non-cooperation movement', he composed many nationalist songs while in jail. This English translation was revealed back as 'Songs of the Cell'. Other poetry books published by Raichoudhary are

- Anubhuti (অনুভূতি)
- Sthapan kar, Sthapan kar (1958),স্থাপন কৰ,স্থাপন কৰ
- Bedanar Ulka (1964) (বেদনাৰ উল্কা)
- Aaji Bondu ki chandere (আজি বন্দো কি ছন্দেৰে)

Other than many poems are published in various magazines. The prose 'Ahuti (আহুতি)' (1954), 'Deka-Dekarir Veda (ডেকা-ডেকেৰীৰ বেদ)’' and 'Kalyanmayiকল্যাণময়ী', 'Bhaktagaurava (ভক্তগৌৰৱ)', 'Jayadratha Badh (জয়দ্ৰথ বধ)' etc.

Two main voices are heard in Raichoudhury's poem. One is the sound of visible nationalism and the other is the soft tone of mystery in 'Tumi(তুমি)' and 'the in Beena(বীণা)'. The poem 'Tumi' begins in beloved physical attracting beauty and finally ends in the global beauty and indomitable beauty of the world. His nationalist poems have a sharp protest against the atrocities and atrocities and there are great calls to go ahead with the battle of life. The poet wishes for a life in which human beings can develop by putting away all the hypocrisy, lowness. He was also the editor of "Setonaa (চেতনা)" and "Dekaa Asom (ডেকা অসম)", two Assamese magazines. Raichoudhury is known as "Assam Kesari" (The lion of Assam) because of his firebrand nationalist character. He was the President of Assam Sahitya Sabha in 1950. In 1965 he won the Sahitya Akademi Award.

The 'Ambikagiri Raichaudhuri Award' presented by Asam Sahitya Sabha is named after him.

Assam Kesari Ambikagiri died on 2 January 1967 at the age of 81.

== See also ==
- List of Indian poets
- Assamese literature
- History of Assamese literature
- List of Assamese-language poets
- List of people from Assam
- List of Asam Sahitya Sabha Presidents
- List of Assamese writers with their pen names
