= Goalpara =

- City
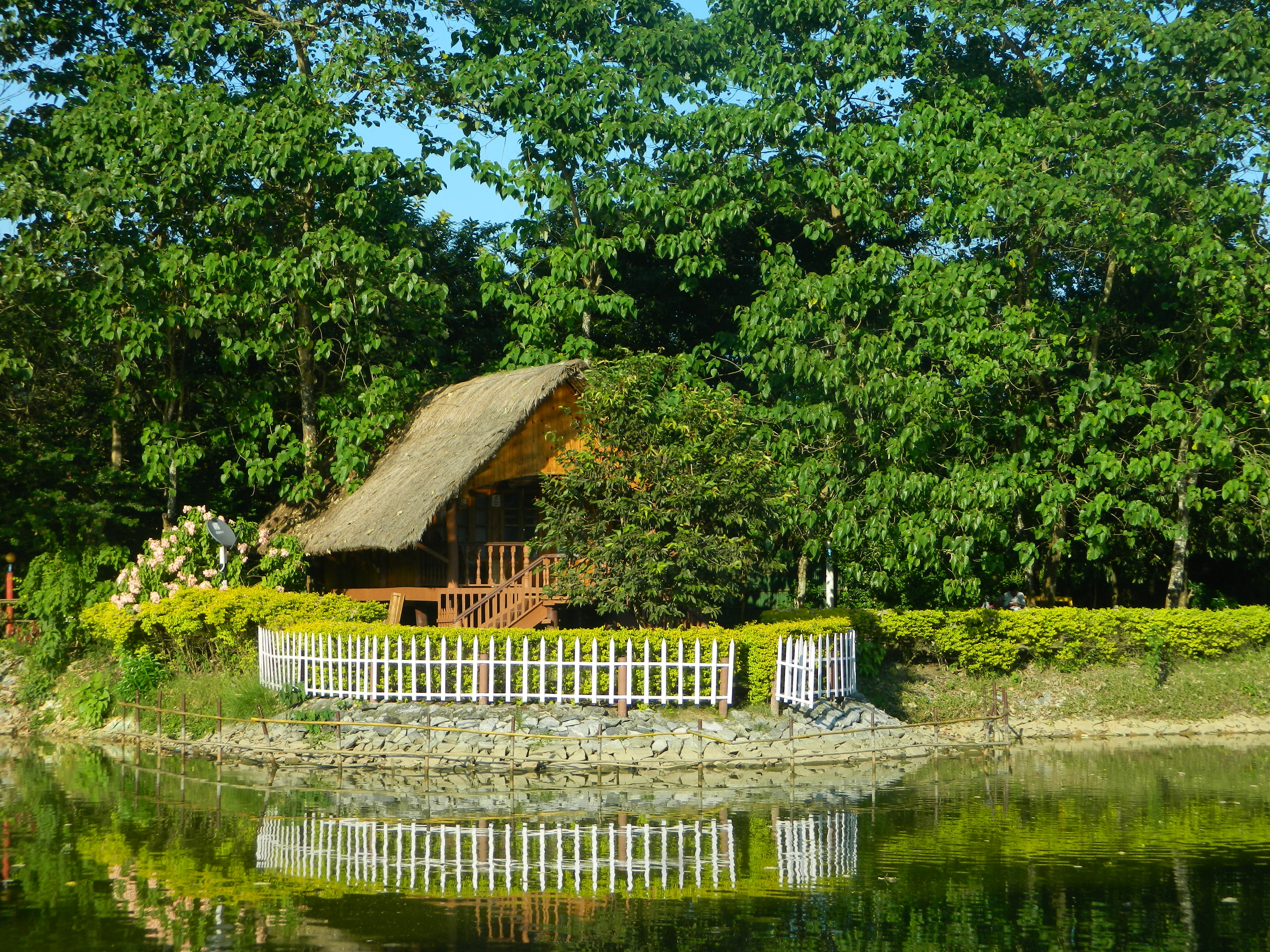
- A Goalpara Assam homestead

- Location in Assam, India Goalpara (India)
- Coordinates: 26.17°N 90.62°E
- Country: India
- State: Assam
- District: Goalpara

Government
  - Body: Goalpara Municipality Board
- Elevation: 35 m (115 ft)

Population (2011)
  - Total: 53,430

Languages
  - Official: Assamese
- Time zone: UTC+5:30 (IST)
- PIN: 783123-783101
- ISO 3166 code: IN-AS
- Vehicle registration: AS-18
- Website: goalpara.assam.gov.in

Goalpara (/ɡoʊɑːlˈpɑːrə/) is a city and the district headquarters of Goalpara district, Assam, India. It is situated 134 kilometres (83 mi) to the west of Guwahati.

== Etymology ==
The name Goalpara is said to have originated from the word "Gwaltippika" meaning Guwali village, or "the village of the milk men" (Yadav). In Assamese, gowal means "milkman" and para means "neighbourhood".

== Geography ==
Goalpara is located on the bank of the river Brahmaputra. It has an average elevation of 35 metres (114 feet).

Hulukanda Hill, located at the heart of Goalpara on the bank of the Brahmaputra River, is one of the natural scenic views in the town, with various kinds of waterfowl and monkeys. There are some other bodies of water, such as Hashila Beel, Kumri Beel, and Urpad Beel. Hasila Beel and Urpad Beel Proposed as Reserve Forest (PRF) under Section 5 of the Assam Forest Regulation, 1891.The Urpad Beel becomes the centre of migratory birds during Oct-March. The evergreen forests on low hills create an undulating landscape.

Goalpara district consists of 8 blocks:

- Balijana
- Jaleswar
- Kamakhyabari
- Krishnai
- Kuchdhowa
- Lakhipur
- Matia
- Rangjuli

== Demographics ==
Religions in Goalpara town (2011)
1. Islam (53.6%)
2. Hinduism (45.0%)
3. others (1.36%)
Languages of Goalpara town (2011)
1. Assamese (47.9%)
2. Bengali (46.8%)
3. Hindi (3.60%)
4. Bodo, Rabha and Others (1.70%)

As of 2011 Indian Census, Goalpara had a total population of 53,430, of which 26,970 were males and 26,460 were females. Population within the age group of 0 to 6 years was 6,125. The total number of literates in Goalpara was 39,627 which constituted 74.2% of the population with male literacy of 77.1% and female literacy of 71.2%. The effective literacy rate of 7+ population of Goalpara was 83.8%, of which male literacy rate was 87.3% and female literacy rate was 80.2%. The Scheduled Castes and Scheduled Tribes population was 6,158 and 1,702 respectively. Goalpara had 11,617 households in 2011.

=== Religion ===
The largest religious group in the town are Muslims constituting 53.65% of the population. Hindus make up 44.99% and 1.36% are others.

=== Languages ===
Assamese is the official language of the district and is spoken by 47.9% of the population, while Bengali is spoken by 46.8% and Hindi spoken by 3.6%, and 1.7% Bodo and other languages as per 2011 census. The Goalpariya is the most commonly spoken dialect of Assamese in the town.

== Education ==
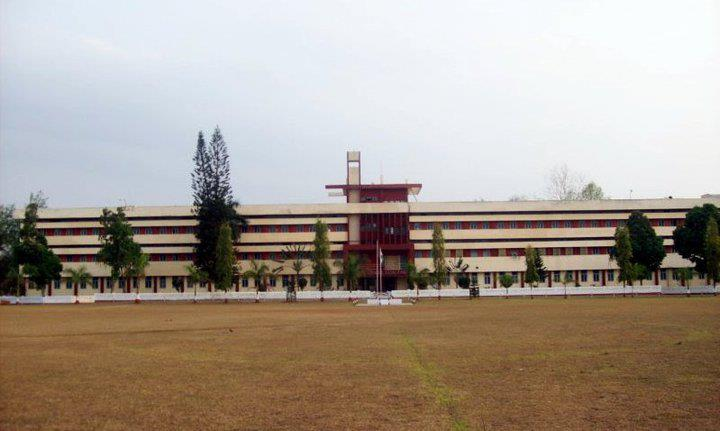
Sainik School, Goalpara

Some of the major educational institutions are:

=== Schools ===
- Sainik School, Goalpara

=== Colleges ===
- Goalpara College, Goalpara
- Dudhnoi College, Dudhnoi, Goalpara
- Bikali College, Dhupdhara, Goalpara
- Goalpara Law College, Bhalukdubi, Goalpara

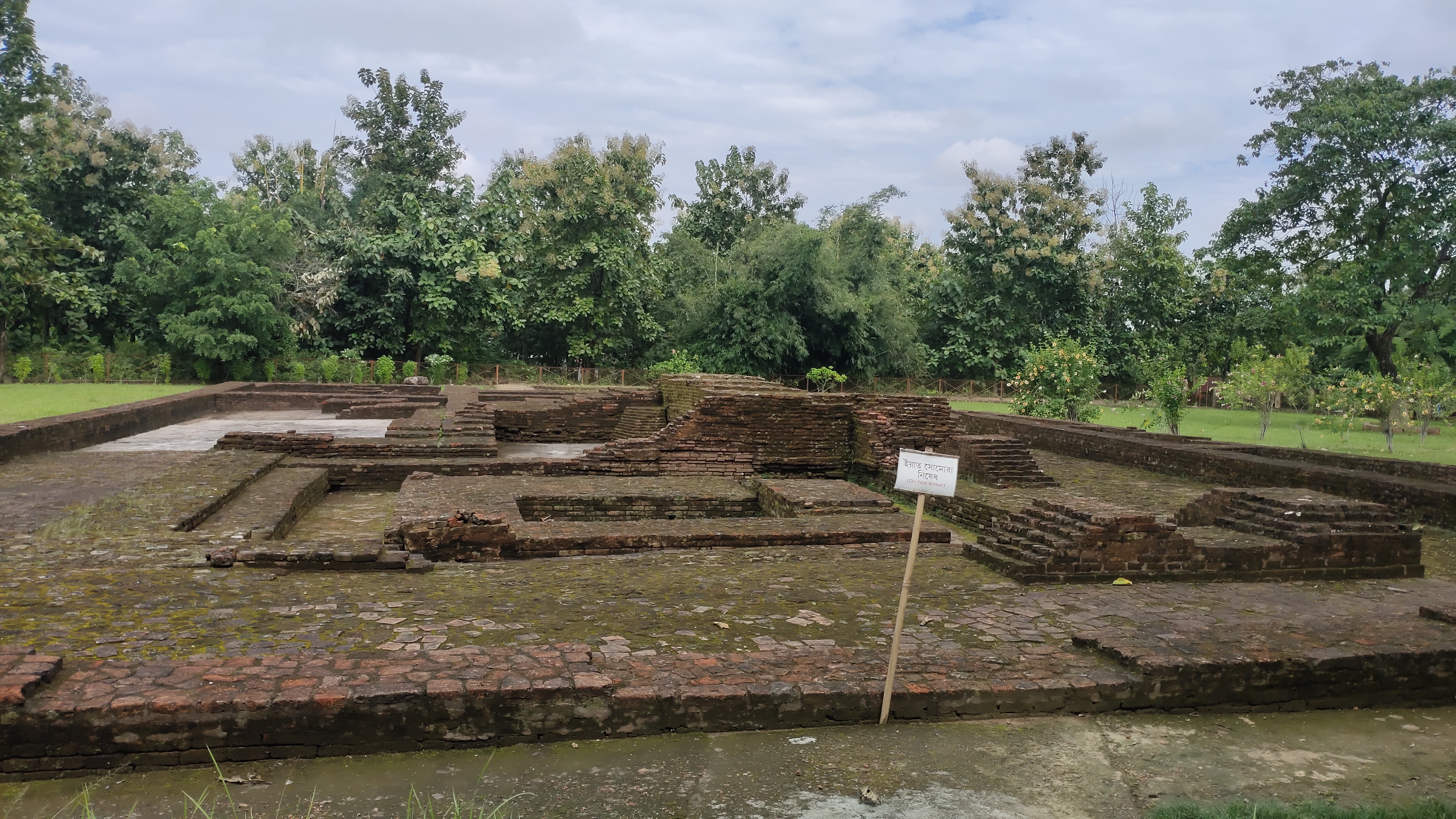
ancient heritage in goalpara

== Politics ==
Goalpara district consists of four assembly constituencies which are Goalpara East, Goalpara West, Jaleshwar and Dudhnoi. Goalpara town is under Goalpara East constituency, the current MLA is AK Rasheed Alam (INC)

== Notable people ==
- Abbas Uddin Ahmed, singer
- Ashraful Haque, Bollywood actor
- Adil Hussain, actor and theatre personality
- Baharul Islam, actor and theatre personality
- Birubala Rabha, Indian activist who campaigns against witchcraft and witch hunting
- Bhakti Ballabh Tirtha, spiritual master
- Jugal Kishore Choudhury, modernist architect
- Leela Roy, Indian independence activist, Member of the Constituent Assembly
