= Kamalakanta Bhattacharya (Assam) =

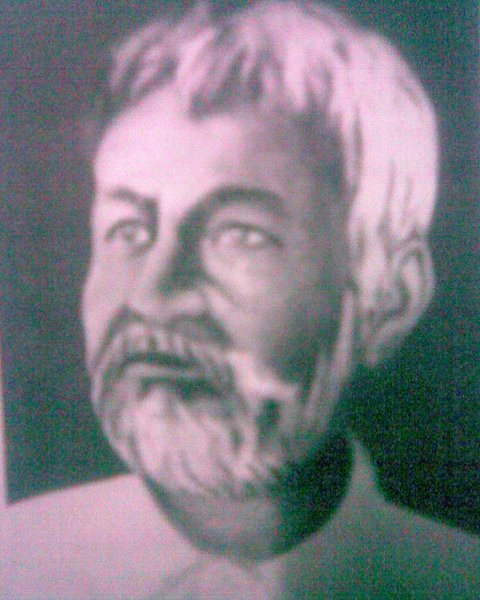
- Born: 23 December 1853; Gorehagi, Biswanath Chariali, Sonitpur, Assam
- Died: 14 December 1936 (aged 82); Guwahati, Assam
- Relatives: He was the ansester of parasar Bhattacharya.
- Writing career
- Language: Assamese

Kamalakanta Bhattacharya (1853–1936) was a prominent essayist and poet belonged to the Oronodoi era of Assamese literature. He was born on 23 December 1853 in Gorehagi village, Biswanath Chariali, Sonitpur district, Assam. He was popularly known as 'Agnikobi'. Politically, he was strongly nationalistic. He opposed the introduction of Bengali as the official language of Assam in 1871. At the annual meeting of the Indian National Congress in 1886 in Calcutta, he participated as a delegate for Assam. In 1929 he sat as Secretary General of the Organization Culture Asam Sahitya Sabha ago. He was also the president of the Asam Sahitya Sabha in 1929 held at Jorhat district, Assam. He campaigned for the abolition of the box security regulations and promoted the education of women. He also participated in the swadeshi movement in 1905–06.

== Literary works ==
- Manat mor para Katha (autobiography)
- Chintanala ("The Fire of Thoughts", a collection of poems, 1870)
- Chinta Tarangini ("The Stream of Thought Waves", a collection of poems, 1933)
- Ashtabakrar Atmajivani
- Ashtabakra (poetry)

== See also ==
- Assamese literature
- History of Assamese literature
- List of Asam Sahitya Sabha presidents
- List of Assamese writers with their pen names
