= Goalpara district =

Coordinates: 26°26′N 90°22′E

- District of Assam
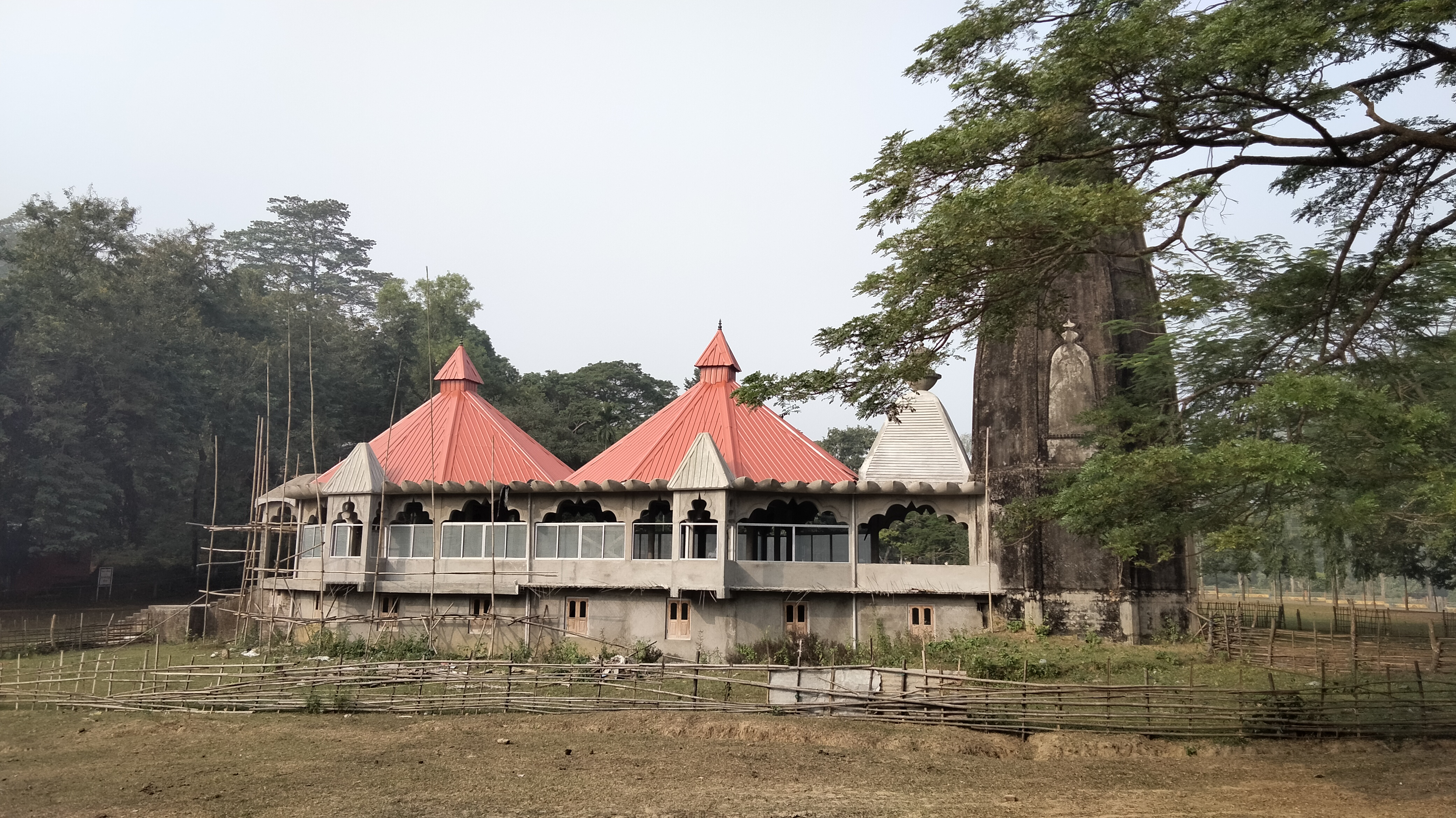
- Shiva temple at Sri Surya Pahar
- Nickname: Raghunath
- Interactive map of Goalpara district
- Country: India
- State: Assam
- Division: Lower Assam
- Established: 20 October 1994
- Headquarters: Goalpara

Government
  - Lok Sabha constituencies: Dhubri (shared with South Salmara-Mankachar District, Dhubri district)
  - Vidhan Sabha constituencies: Dudhnai, Goalpara East, Goalpara West, Jaleswar

Area
  - Total: 1,824 km^{2} (704 sq mi)

Population (2011)
  - Total: 1,008,183
  - Density: 552.7/km^{2} (1,432/sq mi)
- Demonym: Goalpariya

Languages
  - Official: Assamese
- Time zone: UTC+5:30 (IST)
- PIN: 783 101 to** (** area code)
- Telephone code: 03663
- ISO 3166 code: IN-AS, IN-AS-GP
- Vehicle registration: AS 18
- Website: goalpara.assam.gov.in

Goalpara district is an administrative district of the Indian state of Assam. The district headquarters is Goalpara.

== History ==
It was a princely state ruled by the Koch kings and the then ruler of the undivided kingdom. Today the erstwhile Goalpara district is divided into Kokrajhar, Bongaigaon, Dhubri, and Goalpara district.

The name of the district Goalpara is said to have originally derived from 'Gwaltippika' meaning 'Guwali village' or the village of the milk men means (Yadav). The history of Goalpara goes back to several centuries. The district came under British rule in 1765. Before this, the area was under the control of the Koch dynasty. In 1826 the British accessed Assam and Goalpara was annexed to the North-East Frontier in 1874, along with the creation of district headquarters at Dhubri.

On 1 July 1983 two districts were split from Goalpara: Dhubri and Kokrajhar. On 29 September 1989 Bongaigaon district was created from parts of Goalpara and Kokrajhar.

== Geography ==
The district headquarters are located at Goalpara. Goalpara district occupies an area of 1,824 square kilometres (704 sq mi), comparatively equivalent to South Korea's Jeju-do.

== Economy ==
In 2006 the Indian government named Goalpara one of the country's 250 most backward districts (out of a total of 640). It is one of the eleven districts in Assam currently receiving funds from the Backward Regions Grant Fund Programme (BRGF).

== Political divisions ==
There are four Assam Legislative Assembly constituencies in this district: Dudhnoi, Goalpara East, Goalpara West, and Jaleswar. Dudhnoi and Goalpara West are designated for scheduled tribes. Dudhnoi and Goalpara West are in the Gauhati Lok Sabha constituency, whilst the other two are in the Dhubri Lok Sabha constituency.

Following are the present MLA's of Goalpara-

- Goalpara East: AK Rasheed Alam (INC)
- Goalpara West: Abdur Rashid Mondal (INC)
- Jaleswar : Aftabuddin (INC)
- Dudhnoi : Jadav Swargiary (INC)(ST)

== Demographics ==
According to the 2011 census Goalpara district has a population of 1,008,183, roughly equal to the nation of Cyprus or the US state of Montana. of which 171,657 are children between 0–6 years of age. Goalpara has a sex ratio of 964 females for every 1000 males. The crude literacy rate of the district is 55.91%, while the effective literacy rate of 7+ population is 67.4%. 13.69% of the population lives in urban areas. Scheduled Castes and Scheduled Tribes make up 4.47% and 22.97% of the population respectively.

Historical population
Year	Pop.	±% p.a.
1901	90,482	—
1911	117,602	+2.66%
1921	149,263	+2.41%
1931	172,782	+1.47%
1941	198,407	+1.39%
1951	216,763	+0.89%
1961	297,178	+3.21%
1971	433,516	+3.85%
1991	668,138	+2.19%
2001	822,035	+2.09%
2011	1,008,183	+2.06%

=== Religions ===
Religion in Goalpara district (2011)
1. Islam (57.5%)
2. Hinduism (41.9%)
3. Others (0.61%)

Population of circles by religion
Circle	Muslims	Hindus	Christians	Others
Lakhipur	80.88%	17.42%	1.49%	0.21%
Balijana	56.22%	32.27%	11.25%	0.26%
Matia	61.43%	32.90%	5.41%	0.26%
Dudhnoi	6.52%	70.34%	22.81%	0.33%
Rangjuli	29.56%	61.30%	8.92%	0.22%

Muslim population in Goalpara district is 57.52%, while Hindu population is 34.51% and Christian Population stands at 7.72% and others include 0.25% respectively as per as census 2011 report. All the Garos are Christian. Way back in 1971, Hindus were slight majority in Goalpara district with forming 50.1% of the population, while Muslims were 41.5% at that time.

=== Languages ===
Languages of Goalpara district (2011)
1. Assamese (51.8%)
2. Bengali (28.8%)
3. Garo (7.56%)
4. Rabha (5.16%)
5. Bodo (3.53%)
6. Hindi (0.94%)
7. Others (2.20%)

At the time of the 2011 census, 51.78% of the population spoke Assamese, 28.83% Bengali, 7.56% Garo, 5.16% Rabha, 3.53% Boro and 0.94% Hindi as their first language.

== Tourism ==
Tourist spots in the district include:

- Sri Surya Pahar, a significant but relatively unknown archaeological site in Assam, a hill which showcases the remains of cultural heritage of three important religions of India, Buddhism, Jainism and Hinduism.
- Dodan Hill has a Shiva Temple on its top. The temple was established by a general of the army of King Bana of Sonitpur named Dodan.
- Pir Majhar is situated in Goalpara town, a tomb of a saint named Hazarat Sayed Abul Kasem Kharasani. He is a saint who was respected by Hindus and Muslims alike.
- Pir Majhar is situated in Katarihara, Golapara, a tomb of a Muslim saint named Al Bakdadi.
- Hulukanda hill is located at the center of Goalpara.
- Sri Tukreswari hill
- Paglartek Baba at Barbhita
- Urpod beel of Agia
- Dhamar Risen beel of Lakhipur, Goalpara are some other attractions of the district.
- Hulukanda Hill, near Bramhaputra river in the town used to be the center of salt trading during British rule. Daniel Raush used to stay there.
