= List of Assamese writers =

Assamese literature is the entire corpus of poetry, novels, short stories, documents and other writings in the Assamese language. It also includes popular ballads in the older forms of the language during its evolution to the contemporary form. The literary heritage of the Assamese language can be traced back to the c. 9-10th century in the Charyapada, where the earliest elements of the language can be discerned.

Poets are listed in alphabetical order by their pen name, as rendered in Latin script.

Writer	Sobriquet	Pen name
Ambikagiri Raichoudhury	Asom Kesori	
Ananda Chandra Agarwala	Bhangani Konwar	Sri Harsha
Ananda Chandra Barua	Bakulbonor Kavi	
Anandaram Dhekial Phukan		A Native
Ambeshwar Chetia Phukan	Kobita Konwar	
Banikanta Kakati	-	Bhabananda Pathak
Benudhar Sharma	-	Bihguti Bora
Bhabendra Nath Saikia	-	Priya Bandhu:Sanjay:Satyapriyo Pathak
Bhubanmohan Baruah		Kanchan Baruah
Binanda Chandra Barua	Dhwoni Kobii	Kerpai Sarma
Birinchi Kumar Barua	-	Bina Baruah:Rashna Baruah
Bishnuprasad Rabha	Kalaguru	Bishnupriya Rabha Tahkuria
Bishnuram Medhi	Lauha Manab	
Brajanath Sarma	Abhinayacharya	
Chandra Kumar Agarwala	Pratimar Khonikor	
Chakreshwar Bhattacharyya	Rajpathar Sil	
Ganesh Chandra Gogoi	Paporir Kavi	
Gopinath Bordoloi	Lokapriya	
Gunabhiram Barua	-	Guru Dutta
Hem Barua	Tyagbir	Sonaram Chand
Hiren Gohain	-	Niranjan Phukan
Indira Goswami		Mamoni RaY som Goswami
Jyotiprasad Agarwalla	Roopkonwar	
Kamalakanta Bhattacharyya	Agnikobi	Astabakra
Kanaklata Baruah	Birbala	
Lakshminath Bezbaroa	Roxoraj, Sahityarathi	Kripabar Barbaruah
Mahendranath Deka Phukan		Monai Boiragi
Mafijuddin Ahmed Hazarika	Gyanmalinir Kavi	
Mahim Bora	Rangajiya kavi	Dhanbor Kai
Nabin Chandra Bordoloi	Karmaveer	
Nalinibala Devi	Atindriyabadi Kavi	
Navakanta Barua	-	Ekhud Kakaideu:Sima Dutta
Nilmoni Phukan Sr	Bagmibor	
Pabitra Kumar Deka	-	Rasheswar Hazarika
Parvati Prasad Baruva	Geetikavi	Hoibor Abhoipuria
Phani Sarma	Natasurjya	
Radha Gobinda Baruah	Singhapurush	
Raghunath Choudhary	Bihogi Kavi	
Rajanikanta Bordoloi	Upanyash Samrat	Bholai Sarma
Rebati Mohan Dutta Choudhury		Silabhadra
Robin Dey	Porasor	Rongmon
Rudra Baruah	Luit Konwar	
Satyanath Bora		Ejon Asomiya
Syed Abdul Malik		Ajagar:Swami Abhangananda
Surendranath Medhi		Saurav Kumar Chaliha
Tarun Ram Phukan	Deshbhakta	
Kumud Ch. Hazarika		Ranju Hazarika
Omeo Kr Das	Lokanayak	

== See also ==
- Assamese poetry
- Assamese literature
- List of Indian poets
