= Sadou Asom Lekhika Samaroh Samiti =

Non-government women's Literary organisation in Assam, India

- সদৌ অসম লেখিকা সমাৰোহ সমিতি
- Formation: November 1974
- Founder: Sheela Borthakur
- Type: Non-Governmental
- Headquarters: Tezpur, Assam
- Official language: Assamese Language

The Sadou Asom Lekhika Samaroh Samiti (lit. 'All Assam Writer's Convention Committee') is a non-government women’s literary organisation in Assam, India. It was founded in 1974 to unite and emancipate the women of Assam through creative pursuits, especially literature. It has more than two hundred branches all over Assam and in Kolkata, Shillong and Dimapur. The head office of the organisation is in Tezpur. The branches of the samiti also have offices in their respective places.

== History ==
Due to various socio-political and economic issues, the social status of Assamese women was not in a good position. This scenario created an urge among the women society to struggle for social equity, justice and adopt various measures to raise the status of women.

On a proposal made by Sheela Borthakur for a separate literary organisation for women in Assam, the samiti was organised. The organisation works to enrich Assamese literature and empower women through literary expression. It tries to create an environment for creative writing and inspires its members to publish different books on short stories, novels, poems and other thoughtful writings.

== Objectives ==
The objectives of the organization are as follows:

- To empower women through education and culture and thereby strengthen their self respect.
- To develop self expression through creative work and contribute positively to Assamese language, literature and culture.
- To publish and preserve valuable books written by women writers.
- To preserve and enrich the rich cultural heritage of the country.

== Publications ==
- Lekhikar Jibani (in four volumes)
- Dharmeswari Devi Baruani Rachana Sambhar (1992)
- Padmabhushan Puspalatar Chintar Rengani
- Mahasweta
- Barerohonia
- Borma Tomak ( Anthology of Short Stories)
- Satabdir Sadhu (Collection of Assamese tales of a hundred years)
- Lekhikar Grantha Panji ( Bibliography of Assamese women writers)
- Asamiya Sahityat Nari (Literary criticism)
- Aitai Sadhu Koi (Compilation of short stories written by women writers)

Lekhika is a biennial magazine which is also the mouthpiece of the organisation. All branches of Lekhika Samaroh Samiti have their own publications along with an annual magazine. Some of the important publications of the branches are Sotorupa, Manihar, Sandhani, Salankrita, Chayanika, Sreelekha, Anulekha, Ananya, Sonalimegh, Dulari, Mirdan, Nari Aru Nyaktitya and Jibanar Jonaki Pohar.

== See also ==
- Asam Sahitya Sabha
- Assamese literature
- Assam Valley Literary Award
- Assamese Language Movement
- Dark Age of the Assamese language
- Asam Sahitya Sabha Patrika
- Asamiya Bhasa Unnati Sadhini Sabha
- Manipuri Sahitya Parishad
