= Benudhar Rajkhowa =

Indian writer, poet and dramatist (1872-1955)

- Born: 11 December 1872; Dibrugarh district, Assam, India
- Died: 1955 (aged 82–83)
- Occupations: Deputy commissioner, writer, poet, dramatist
- Writing career
- Language: Assamese

Benudhar Rajkhowa (1872-1955) was a prominent writer, poet and dramatist from Assam. He was the president of the Asam Sahitya Sabha in 1926 held at Dhuburi district, Assam. When he was studying at Calcutta, he had done a pivot role for development of Asamiya Bhasa Unnati Sadhini Sabha, a literary organization from Assam. He was honoured with Rai Bahadur title by the ruling British government.

== Early life and career ==
Benudhar Rajkhowa was born on 11 December 1872 to Suchadaram Rajkhowa and Hirawati Rajkhowa in Dibrugarh district of Assam. After having primary education in Dibrugarh he had left for Calcutta for higher education. Returning home, he worked in various posts like Extra Assistant Commissioner, Deputy commissioner under the ruling British Government.

== Literacy Works ==
Rajkhowa was also an editor of the Bijuli magazine from 1890 to 1892. He started writing in Jonaki, a leading Assamese in that period.

Some of his books are:

- Assamese popular superstitions and Assamese demonology (1973)
- Asamīẏā khaṇḍabākya-kosha (1961)
- Assamese Popular Superstitions and Assamese Demonology (1973)
- Assamese Demonology(1905)
- Historical Sketches of Old Assam: Based on an Analysis of Popular Proverbs (1917)
- A dictionary of phrases from Assamese to Assamese and English (1917) (অসমীয়া খণ্ড বাক্যকোষ)
- Notes on the Sylhetee Dialect(1913)
- Garland of Praises, English translation of Gunamala in verse (1923).

Poetry books;

- Dehar pralay (দেহাৰ প্ৰলয়)
- Jivan sandhiya (জীৱন সন্ধিয়া)
- Chandra Sombhob (চন্দ্ৰ সম্ভৱ) (1895),
- Poncho Kobita (পঞ্চ কবিতা) (1895),
- Doxogeet (দশগীত) (1899),
- Soru Lorar Gaan (সৰু লৰাৰ গান) (1901),

Plays

- Durjudhonor urubhongo (দুৰ্যোধনৰ উৰুভঙ্গ) (1903),
- Seuti Kiron (সেউতি কিৰণ) (1898),
- Deka Gabhoru (ডেকা-গাভৰু) (1889),
- Dorbaar (দৰবাৰ) (1902),
- Kolijug (কলিযুগ) (1904),
- Dokhyojogyo (দক্ষযজ্ঞ)(1908),
- Sotikaar Soibhota (শতিকাৰ সভ্যতা) (1908),
- Lokhimi Tiruta (লখিমী তিৰোতা) (1909),
- Osikhita Ghoini (অশিক্ষিতা ঘৈণী) (1912),
- Bipro Damodor (বিপ্ৰ দামোদৰ) (1917),
- Tini Ghoini (তিনি-ঘৈণী) (1928),
- Suror Sristi (চোৰৰ সৃষ্টি) (1931),
- Jompuri (যমপুৰী) (1931),
- Tuponir porinaam (টোপনিৰ পৰিণাম) (1932)

Song collections

- * Asomiya Bhai (অসমীয়া ভাই) (1901),
- Bahi (বাঁহী) (1906)

Autobiography

- Mora jiwana-dapoṇa (মোৰ জীৱন দাপোন)

== See also ==
- Assamese literature
- History of Assamese literature
- List of Asam Sahitya Sabha presidents
- List of Assamese writers with their pen names
