= Rajanikanta Bordoloi =

Indian writer

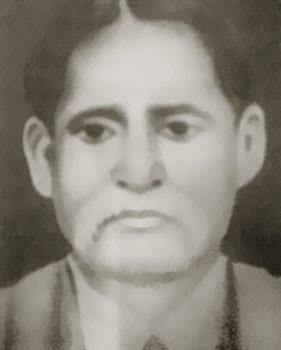
- Born: 24 November 1867; Guwahati, Assam
- Died: 25 March 1940 (aged 72); Guwahati, Assam
- Occupations: Writer, sub-deputy collector, tea planter
- Writing career
- Pen name: Upanyash Samrat (king of novel)
- Language: Assamese
- Notable work: Miri Jiyori (1894)

Rajanikanta Bordoloi was a noted writer, journalist and tea planter from Assam, India. Some critics called him the Walter Scott of Assam. He was President of the Asam Sahitya Sabha in 1925 which was held at Nagaon.

As a part of the cultural exchange between Assamese culture and Meitei culture, the Meitei classic tale of Khamba and Thoibi became an Assamese classic as well, after being translated into Assamese language as "Khamba Thoibir Sadhukatha", by Rajanikanta Bordoloi.

== Works ==
Novels

1. Miri Jiyori (1894)
2. Manomoti(1900),
3. Rahdoi Ligiri (1930),
4. Nirmal Bhakat (1927),
5. Tamreswar Mandir (1926)
6. Rangilee (1925)
7. Donduadrah (1909),
8. Radha aru Rukminir Ron(1925)
9. Thamba-Thoibir Sadhu (1932)

He was a regular contributor to many leading magazines in that period such as Junaki, Banhi (magazine), Usha, Assam Hitoishi and Awahon. He also edited a monthly magazine called Pradipika.

== See also ==
- Assamese literature
- History of Assamese literature
- List of Asam Sahitya Sabha presidents
- List of Assamese writers with their pen names
