= Dimbeswar Neog =

Indian poet, writer, critic and educator (1899–1966)

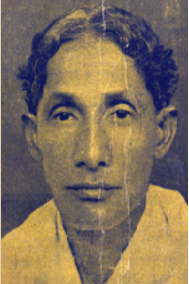
- Born: 7 August 1899; Kamarfadia, Sibsagar, Assam, India
- Died: 11 November 1966 (aged 67); Assam, India
- Occupation: Author
- Website: http://www.dimbeswarneog.com/

Dimbeswar Neog (1899–1966), also known as the Indradhenu Poet, was a renowned writer, literati, critic, educator and poet of Assamese literature.

By Dimbeswar Neog

== Early life ==
Born in the little riverine village of Kamarfadia in Sibsagar, Assam, Dimbeswar Neog was the eldest child to Manik Chandra Neog and Chandra Prabha. His early education began at Kamarfadia. After his matriculation, he joined Cotton College in Guwahati. He earned his bachelor's degree in 1924 after which he pursued a master's in English study. Most of the literary works of Neog were done during the period while studying at Cotton College. Neog was selected to be the General Secretary of Assam Chatra Sanmelan and remained associated with it from 1921 to 1924. During that period he edited the mouthpiece of Chatra Sanmelan 'Janmabhumi' and 'Milan'. He is known as " Indradhenu kobi"( Rainbow poet) of Assam. Dimbeswar Neog started his professional life as a teacher in the Sivasagar Government School on 19 April 1925. Later he earned his master's degree in Assamese in 1940 from Calcutta University.

== Personal life ==
Born in a typical Assamese village Kamarfadia of Sibsagar, Assam, Dimbeswar Neog spent his childhood days amidst the colourful glee of nature. His father was Manik Chandra Neog and his mother was Chandraprabha Neog. He had two brothers - noted scholar Maheswar Neog and Mukheswar Neog. While at Cotton College, he came into contact with poets like Chandra kumar Agarwalla. He was close to personalities like Chandradhar Baruah, Mitradev Mahanta, Bani Kanta Kakoti and Suniti Kumar Chatterji.

In 1930, Dimbeswar Neog married Aajaleetora (Xuwonikon), the daughter of renowned writer and Dibrugarh district judge Benudhar Rajkhowa. Dimbeswar and Aajaleetora Neog had seven children.The couple later had seven children, three sons and four daughters. They then moved to their residence "Xuwoni Poja" (Beauty Cot) in Torajan, Jorhat. The children were Maniki Madhuri (Keteki), Basanta Mongal (Chandan), Amiya Madhuri (Moloya), Sapon Madhuri (Nizara), Jeewan Madhuri (Jonaki), Sarat Mongal (Nandan) and Hemanta Mongal (Bondon).

He died in Assam Medical College after a brief period of illness in 1966.

== Literary scholarship ==
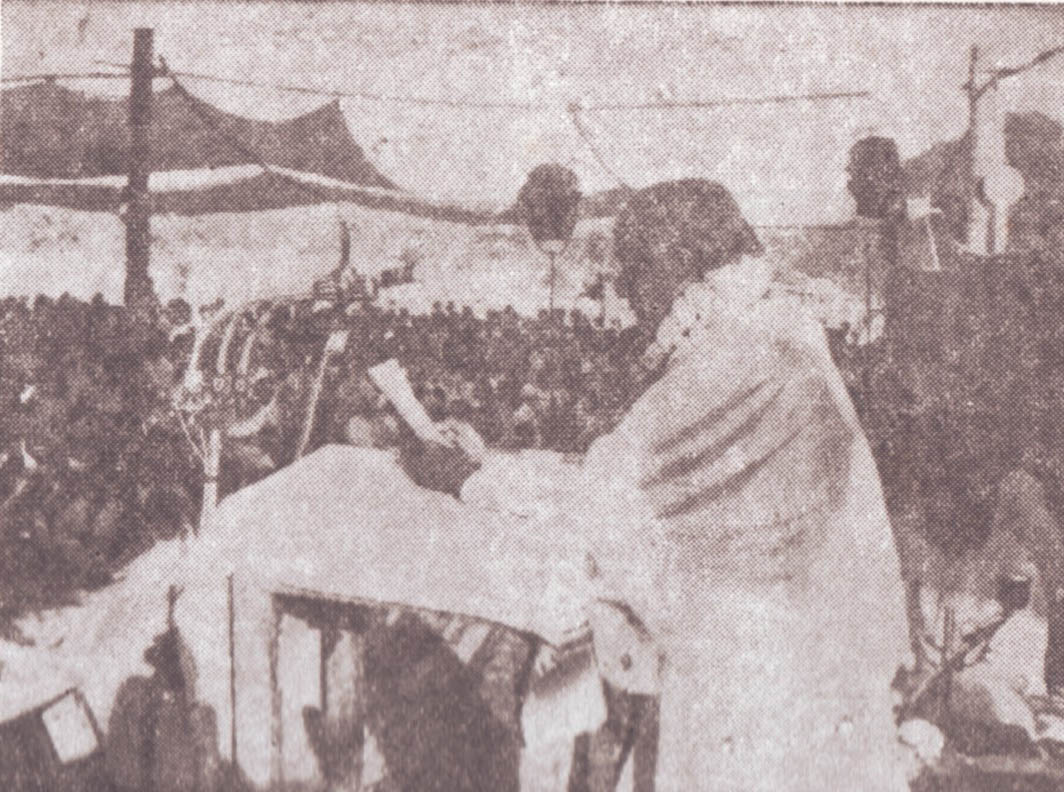
Dimbeswar Neog, presiding Asam Sahitya Sabha, 32nd Nalbari session in 1965

Neog's contributions to the history of Assamese literature and language are impeccable. He authored around 100 books. His works ranged from stories, verses, novels, drama, history of literature and criticism to folk literature. Neog is best known as a critic of Assamese literature. According to the Sahitya Akademi, India's National Academy of Letters, two of Neog's works on Assamese literature "made significant contribution to the development of critical assessment in Assamese literature on an academic plane." Neog's approach to literary criticism has, however, been criticized as being "not entirely free of personal prejudice" and "occasionally vitiated by his biased analysis."

In 1965, Dimbeswar Neog presided over the 32nd session of Asom Sahitya Sabha in Nalbari.

== Memorial committee ==
A memorial committee entitled "Dimbeswar Neog Xuworoni Santha" (Dimbeswar Neog Memorial Committee) in honour of Dimbeswar Neog was formed at his residence in the year 1969 under the aegis of his eldest son Late Basanta Mangal Neog. Gradually, the committee was officially constituted with Dr.Bhupen RoyChodhury as its first secretary and the memorial meetings began to be organized on a public domain for the greater interest of the people. Since then, the committee has been annually organizing the memorial meetings on the 12 November, which is Neog's death anniversary. Prominent scholars and literary geniuses of the state have graced this yearly occasion from time to time as chief speakers, speaking about his invaluable contribution to Assamese literature as well as by being present as distinguished guests. Recitation of his poems, songs penned by him are also performed in these meetings as an ode to him. In 1992, "Dimbeswar Neog Xuworoni Santha" was renamed to "Dimbeswar Neog-Aajaleetara Neog Xuworoni Saurabh Samiti" to commemorate his better-half, Ajaleetara Neog, who had been closely associated with children's literature herself. The committee has been conducting art competitions among children from time to time in the memory of Ajaleetara Neog as well as Dimbeswar Neog. In order to mark the glorious 45 years of this memorial committee, a special presentation has been screened at the yearly memorial meeting of 2014.

== Tributes ==
- An English documentary on the life and works of Dimbeswar Neog was made in 2008. This documentary is regularly screened in the memorial meetings. This documentary is also available on YouTube.

Click here to view the documentary

- A compilation of few of his choicest songs has been made into a music CD entitled Xuwoni Tora and launched at the Guwahati Press Club in June 2011. Several eminent artists like Pulak Bannerjee, Tarali Sarma, Zublee, Debajit Choudhury, Aparna Dutta Choudhury, Dr. Rajeeb Bhattacharyya, Anupjyoti Choudhury had rendered their voices for the album.

Click here to access the album

== Selected works ==
Poetry

- Malika (Elegy,1921)
- Safura (Gitawali, Collection of Songs, 1923)
- Thupitora (1925)
- Malati (1927)
- Bihuwoti (1929)
- Indradhanu (1929)
- Mukuta (1932)
- Thapona (1948)
- Manuh (1965)
- Axoma (1947)
- Bichitra (1948)
- Swohidaan (1952)
- Rahasya Logori
- Xuwoni (1952)
- Meghdoot (Translation,1940)
- Emuthi Geet Aru Kobita এমুঠি গীত আৰু কবিতা

Folk literature

- Banhi
- Putoli
- Bhogjora (Collection of 'Ainam' and children play songs)
- Dohali (Collection of yojanas)
- Parijat
- Moni Konwar
- Kachon Konwari
- Phool Konwar
- Postula Konwari
- Namoti
- Dakor Boson Vedor Baani
- Rohrohi
- Pani Mithoi
- Banabenu(Flute of Forest), (collection of three books Akul Pathika, Phagunee and Bihuwati)

Novels

- Gaone-Nagare (1960)
- Sisuleela
- Kundila Nagara

Drama

- Deepawali
- Krishna Leela
- Kundil Konwari
- Okaal Basanta
- Madan Bhasma
- Kamrup
- Ras Kriya

Literary criticism

- New Light on the History of Assamese Literature
- The Origin and Growth of the Axomiya Language
- A Light coming through wall of Assamese Literature-- Kirtan Ghosa
- Light on Assamese Literature
- Prativa
- Janakabya
- Katha- Prativa
- Modern History of Assamese Literature
- Axomiya Sahityor Odhoyon
- Axomiya Sahityor Buronji

Religion and faith

- Jagat Guru Sankardev
- JugoNayak Sankardev
- Mahapurusism
- Vaisnava Dharmar Atiguri
- Vaisnava Dharmar Kramavistar
- Vaisnava Dharmara Bhaktitatva
- Naradiya Bhoktisutra and Mahapurusiasm-- a Universal Religion
- Santi-Kowas শান্তি-কৱচ
