= Asam Sahitya Sabha Patrika =

Journal

- Frequency: Quarterly
- Publisher: Asam Sahitya Sabha
- First issue: October 1927
- Country: India
- Language: Assamese

Asam Sahitya Sabha Patrika (Assamese: অসম সাহিত্য সভা পত্ৰিকা; Ôxôm Xahityô Xôbha Pôtrika) is an official journal of the Asam Sahitya Sabha. The first issue appeared in October, 1927. Chandradhar Barua was the founder editor of the journal who edited the journal until 1936.

== List of Editors ==
Sl.	Name	Period
1	Chandradhar Barua	1927-1936
2	Dimbeswar Neog	1936-1943
3	Rameswar Baruah	1940-1941
4	Kesab Narayan Dutta	1952-1953
5	Rajanikantha Deva Sarma	1954/1955; 1956/1957
6	Premodhar Rajkhowa	1955/1956
7	Satyendranath Sarma	1957/1958 - 1960/1961
8	Jatindranath Goswami	1961/1962-1962/1963
9	Biswanarayan Shastri	1963/1964
10	Jogesh Das	1966
11	Satyendranarayan Goswami	1967
12	Durgeswar Sarma	1968
13	Harichandra Bhattacharyya	1969
14	Abdus Sattar	1971-1972
15	Jatin Goswami	1971; 1975-1977
16	Poreshnatta Borena (?)	1972/1973
17	Hemanta Kumar Sarma	1973/1974
18	Jogendranarayan Bhuyan	1977-1979
19	Parikhit Hazorika	1979-1981

== See also ==
- Assam Sahitya Sabha
- List of Asam Sahitya Sabha
- History of Assamese literature
- Asamiya Bhasa Unnati Sadhini Sabha
