= Assamese Language Movement =

Indian mass movement

The Assamese Language Movement (Assamese: /ɔxɔmia bʱaxa andʊlɔn/) refers to a series of political activities demanding the recognition of the Assamese language as the only sole official language and medium of instruction in the educational institutions of Assam, India.

The struggle for the use of Assamese for official purposes, in courts and as a medium of instruction in educational institutions began in the nineteenth century, when the region was under the British rule. The use of Bengali in Assam as the language of the courts was resented by the Assamese people and also by American Baptist Missionaries such as Nathan Brown.

Following the agitations for linguistic states in various part of India and the States Reorganization Act (1956), the Assam Sahitya Sabha demanded the use of Assamese as the official language in Assam. This was followed by political movements supporting it and also opposing it. The Assam Official Language Act was passed in 1960, recognizing Assamese as an official language in Assam, while also having provisions for the safeguard of linguistic minorities.

== Background ==
=== The Colonial Era ===
Assam, which was ruled by the Ahom dynasty, Kachari kingdom, Koch dynasty and Chutia dynasty for centuries came into the hands of the British East India Company in 1826 following the Treaty of Yandabo. Assam was placed under the administration of Bengal Presidency. In April 1836, Bengali was declared the language of the courts in Assam, replacing Assamese in the Brahmaputra Valley. Bengali was also used as the medium of instruction in the educational institutions of Assam. Within decades, the Assamese began to resent the state of affairs.

The imposition of Bengali as the language of the court and educational institutions exasperated the Assamese intelligentsia and common society of Assam. As a result of this language imposition, the progress of education in Assam remained slow and deficient. Many Bengalis were brought in and employed in the schools of Assam. There was no encouragement for the writing of school text books in Assamese, and Assamese literature suffered. This was thought to be one of the core factors behind the community conflicts that emerged between the Assamese and Bengali communities in the following decades.

Initially the imposition did not meet with any kind of protest. Rather, the Assamese elite used the language in their writings, and even in conversation, and the language policy of the government went unquestioned for almost a decade. The recruitment of Bengalis to government services increased abruptly, leading to greater unemployment among the Assamese. The increased number of Bengali "Amlas" in the districts of Assam was thought to be posing a challenge to the distinct identities of the People of Assam, because these immigrants had their own culture, language, and traditions, and their existence in the land was perceived as having an effect on Assam's language, culture, economy, and political status.

American Baptist Missionaries were one of the first to take up the cause of the Assamese language. With the desire to spread Christian values in the native language of the people, they started publishing texts in Assamese and initiated the publication of the first Assamese newspaper- Orunodoi. They are believed to have inspired a younger generation of Assamese intellectuals to pursue the cause. Assamese intellectuals such as Anandaram Dhekial Phukan wrote in the 'Orunodoi era'. He also wrote books such as 'Axomiya Lorar Mitro' (Assamese: অসমীয়া ল'ৰাৰ মিত্ৰ, 'Friend of an Assamese Boy'). Gunabhiram Barua was involved with the Assam-Bandhu. Hemchandra Barua contributed to the development and modernization of the language through the publication of grammar texts such as Oxomiya Byakoron (অসমীয়া ব্যাকৰণ), Oxomiya Lorar Byakoron (অসমীয়া ল'ৰাৰ ব্যাকৰণ) and dictionaries such as Porhaxolia Obhidhan (পঢ়াশলীয়া অভিধান) and Hemkosh (হেমকোষ).

In 1872, Lieutenant governor of Bengal, George Campbell declared Assamese the language of education and administration for its native speakers. Two years later, in 1874, Assam acquired the status of a Chief Commissioner's Province. The Chief Commissioner declared that Assamese shall, from then on, be the sole medium of instruction in the primary educational institutions throughout the province. However, Bengali continued to be used as the medium of instruction in middle and higher educational institutions till the end of the nineteenth century. In 1899, Manick Chandra requested the British Government to set up a college in Guwahati- the Chief Commissioner Henry Cotton inaugurated it in 1901. The college was named Cotton College.

In 1888, the Asamiya Bhasa Unnati Sadhini Sabha was formed to further the cause of the development of the Assamese language, by a group of students then studying in Calcutta. The members of this organization were associated with the Jonaki magazine, in what is known as the Jonaki Era of Assamese Literature.

In 1903–1905, decisions regarding the Partition of Bengal were taken. Viceroy Curzon's decision to divide Bengal in two- the Hindu west and the Muslim east sparked protests- both from the Bengali Hindus- because of their opposition to the division of Bengal, and the Assamese- because the Chief Commissioner's Province of Assam was proposed to be included in the proposed Muslim majority eastern Bengal. The decision was annulled in 1911 and Assam was reinstated as a separate Chief Commissioner's Province.

=== Census data - 1931 and 1951 ===
In 1931, the population of Assamese speakers in Assam Province was 1.74 million- which constituted 31.42% of the total population while by 1951, it turned into 4.55 million, constituting 56.69% of the population. After the Sylhet referendum in 1947, only Karimganj region of Sylhet district of Assam province remained in the region. It had a population where most of them spoke Bengali. Garo Hills, United Khasi-Jayantiya Hills, United Mikir and North-Cachar Hills and Mizo Hills had a combined population of about 800 thousand, less than 5% of which spoke either Assamese or Bengali. Bengali majority Sylhet on the other hand, was included in East Pakistan. The majority of the Tea Tribe people reported their first language to be Assamese. A lot of Bengali Muslims also reported their language to be Assamese, many because of prospective land grants and assimilation with the Assamese society. These are proposed to be reasons of the sharp rise in the population of Assamese speakers in the Census of India. The Government of Assam clarified, "there is nothing unusual in the figures of 1951 census, so far as the Assamese speaking and Bengali speaking populations are concerned. The increase or decrease in the number of people speaking a particular language between 1931-1951 Census is dependent not merely on natural growth and biological factors. Emigrations, immigration and natural absorption of immigrant groups are all relevant factors".

== Official Language Movement ==
Although the demand for making Assamese the official language in Assam, after the independence of India had been raised since 1950, following the States Reorganization Act, 1956, the movement gained a new momentum. The inclusion of Assamese in the Eighth Schedule to the Constitution of India also helped increase a sense of confidence. The Assam Sahitya Sabha passed two resolutions, one in 1950 and another in 1959, stressing the need to make Assamese the official language in Assam. The April 1959 resolution, demanding that Assamese be made the sole official language in Assam- sparked political reaction. During a visit by the then Prime Minister of India, Jawaharlal Nehru to Gauhati University, the students made the same demand. In 22 April, the Assam Pradesh Congress Committee (APCC) passed a resolution supporting it. Students organized processions, strikes and meetings for the cause.

This move to make Assamese the official language was however, protested against by a group of non-Assamese speakers in Assam. Following the APCC resolution, a procession was led out by non-Assamese students in Shillong to oppose the decision to make Assamese the sole official language in Assam. The Shillong students' procession was in turn opposed in Upper Assam- in areas such as Sivasagar, Dibrugarh, Golaghat and Jorhat, where they supported the acceptance of Assamese as the official language. After a tenuous situation, as colleges and the university reopened, the agitation became pronounced in Lower Assam and Guwahati. The Silchar and Karimganj Bar Associations on the other hand passed resolutions demanding President's Rule in the state. On 4 July 1960, an Assamese student was killed and 6 others injured in police firing.

The government of Assam, under the then Chief Minister Bimala Prasad Chaliha proposed the Assamese Official Language Bill in the Assembly on 10 October 1960. The Bill provided for two official languages- Assamese and for an interim period, English. It was passed on 24 October 1960.

Protests in the Barak Valley region- including Cachar, Karimganj etc. against the bill on 19 May 1961 led to the death of a number of protesters. In Cachar itself, on the other hand, the Muslims, the Manipuris and the indigenous Cacharis formed the 'Shanti Parishad' which in a memorandum to the Home Minister urged that Assamese should be the sole official language in Assam. Clashes between the two groups led to deaths and insecurity. A circular was released in 1961 stating that "without prejudice to the provisions contained in Section 3, the Bengali language shall be used for administrative and other official purposes up to and including district level" as the bill was amended on 7 October 1961. This move is associated with the 'Shastri Formula'- named after the then Union Home Minister Lal Bahadur Shastri. Provisions regarding the autonomous districts in the state were also made, where English is the official language.

== Medium of Instruction Movement ==
In 1970, the Gauhati University decided to introduce Assamese as the medium of instruction in all colleges under its jurisdiction, except a few, including colleges in Cachar, Manipur, Nagaland, the NEFA and the then newly proposed Meghalaya. English was allowed as an alternative and no deadline was set to shift to Assamese too. With the possibility of other universities taking a similar decision in the near future, political resentment got pronounced in Cachar through press statements, public meetings etc. In March 1972, the university released a circular that also allowed students to write answers in Bengali in examinations. A section of the Assamese students protested. While they had no objection to students from Cachar writing exams in Bengali, they opposed the application of this in the Brahmaputra Valley. The Assam Sahitya Sabha backed this position. The university in response, quickly changed its stand and declared that only Assamese and English shall be accepted in examination answer-scripts. This resulted in protests in Cachar again and the matter reached the Supreme Court of India, where it was alleged that Article 30 of the Indian Constitution, providing certain rights to linguistic minorities, was violated. The court released a stay order while the Government of Assam supported the idea that a new university shall be set up for the Barak Valley. People in the Brahmaputra Valley opposed the government's stand, as they believed it would make the state, clearly bi-lingual. The people of Cachar also did not support the stand because it diluted their demand for making Bengali an option for colleges even in the Brahmaputra Valley. The All Assam Students Union in the Brahmaputra Valley opposed the stand believing that it was against the suggestion of the States Reorganization Commission, 1956, which suggested Assam as an Assamese speaking state. It called for Bandh on 5 October 1972. While it did not face much opposition initially, a clash in Kharupetia turned violent, and one died. Over the days the clashes spread to the neighbouring Mangaldoi town and other parts of the Brahmaputra Valley such as Dhing, Doboka, Laharighat and Moirabari, mostly between immigrant peasantry and Bengali Hindu refugees. Curfew was set up in parts of Guwahati, Dibrugarh and Nagaon. The clashes were finally tackled by the military. A total of 33 deaths was recorded, including 3 in police firing.

== See also ==
- Assam movement
- Assamese language
- Assamese literature
- Bengali language movement
- Dark Age of the Assamese language
- Muzammil Haque
