= Padmanath Gohain Baruah =

Indian poet, novelist and writer (1871–1946)

- পদ্মনাথ গোহাঞি বৰুৱা
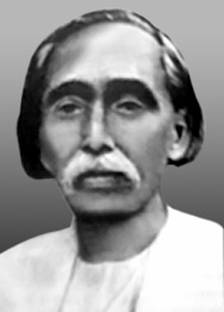
- Pronunciation: [pɔdmɔnatʰ ɡʊɦaĩ bɔɹua]
- Born: 24 November 1871; Nakari , North Lakhimpur, Assam
- Died: 21 April 1946 (aged 74)
- Occupations: novelist, poet, dramatist
- Spouse(s): Lilawati, Hirawati
- Writing career
- Language: Assamese
- Notable works: Bhanumati (novel) (1890), the first Assamese novel

Padmanath Gohain Baruah (Note: Assamese: পদ্মনাথ গোহাঞি বৰুৱা, Assamese pronunciation: [pɔdmɔnatʰ ɡʊɦaĩ bɔɹua].) (Assamese: পদ্মনাথ গোহাঞি বৰুৱা, pronounced [pɔdmɔnatʰ ɡʊɦaĩ bɔɹua]; 24 November 1871 – 21 April 1946) was the first president of Asam Sahitya Sabha and a prominent name in the early part of modern Assamese literature. He was a novelist, poet, dramatist of excellence, analyst and a thought provoking writer. Considering his towering personality and profound knowledge, he is regarded as the "Pitamaha" (great grandfather) in Assamese literary world. In recognition of his outstanding contributions to the Assamese literature and society, the British government gave him Raibahadur title, a rare honour conferred for the first time to an Assamese person. He was also the first literary pensioner of Assam.

== Early life ==
Padmanath Gohain Baruah was born in 1871 at Nakari village in North Lakhimpur. He was first Ahom member of Assam Legislative council. He started schooling in a Bengali medium school at his birthplace. He went to Calcutta in the last part of the 19th century to pursue higher education. His voyage started off as he became an active member of Asomiya Bhasar Unnati Sadhini Sabha, established by a number of Assamese students for the uplifting of Assamese language and literature. However, Gohain Baruah could not complete his BA examination as he found Latin very difficult to master. In those days the Indian students were expected to study an ancient language for their BA course, and Padmanath, who had not learned Sanskrit in his Bangla medium school, had opted for Latin. Failing to complete his graduation, Padmanath started preparing for Bachelor of Law examination, but was barred from appearing in the exam for being underage. Thus, although he had failed to acquire a formal degree in Calcutta, his years there had a very formative influence upon him. It was there that he came into contact with the contemporary stalwarts of the Assamese literature like Gunabhiram Baruah, Hemchandra Goswami, his senior fellow student Lakshminath Bezbarua etc. Moreover, it was Calcutta that he was inspired with a sense of duty towards his nation.

His return to his homeland witnessed his dedication for the noble cause of the uplift of his mother tongue and he went on to write a number of books in various styles and forms.

== Literary career ==
Padmanath with his friend Panindranath Gogoi wrote a number of textbooks in Assamese language. But untimely death of Panindranath led Padmanath to complete the mission alone. To meet the necessities of the Assamese students and teachers he wrote a number of textbooks on history, geography, moral science, teachers hand book and a book on physical exercise including life and works of many stalwarts of Assamese Society. He also edited 'Jivani Sangrah', a rare book in Assamese literature.

He has immense contributions to the domain of Assamese language and literature. He is also revered as a founder of modern Assamese novel. His novel 'Bhanumoti', published in 1890 is the first Assamese novel. From literary point of view it is regarded as the first Assamese novel. His other novel is 'Lahori' (1892).

As a playwright Padmanath was comparable to none in Assamese drama and theatre. He wrote a number of dramas on local plots and events. Picking up a number of glorious chapters from Assam history he wrote historical dramas like Joymoti, Gadadhar, Lachit Borphukan and Sadhani. On the basis of the legendary love story of Usha and Aniruddha he wrote a mythological drama called Ban Raja. In his social drama 'Gaonburha' he neatly described the economic condition of Assamese people under the British rule. His comedy Teton Tamuli and Bhoot Ne Bhram created spontaneous overflow of laughter among the readers and audiences. He is also credited to have written a monumental work: Sri Krishna. He has presented Lord Krishna as a multi faceted personality.

Gohain Baruah was also a poet. His poetical works include ‘Jurani’ (contains 22 sonnets), 'Leela' and 'Fulor Chaneki'. The skilful poetical descriptions of landscapes in 'Leela' are very much beautiful, touchy and sober.

The first session of Asam Sahitya Sabha was held on 26 December 1917 in Sivasagar under his presidency.

== Journalistic career ==
A flag carrier of journalism progress in Assam, Gohain Baruah was closely allied with a number of Assamese journals and magazines. While studying in Kolkata, he with Krishnaprasad Duwara brought out an Assamese monthly called Bijulee. Later he became its editor and ran it for more than three years. In 1901, he with Mathura Mohan Baruah published a weekly called Asom Banti from Tezpur. At a most critical period Asom Banti played a leading role in Assamese language and literature. Acting as a mouthpiece of Assamese society it brought to the focus many important issues to the British government. In 1906 Gohain Baruah published a monthly called Usha. Many stalwarts like Hemchandra Goswami, Satyanath Bora, Sarat Chandra Goswami etc. regularly wrote in the magazine that heralded a new era in Assamese literature.

== See also ==
- Assamese literature
- History of Assamese literature
- List of Assamese writers with their pen names
