= Chandradhar Barua =

Indian writer (1874–1961)

- চন্দ্ৰধৰ বৰুৱা
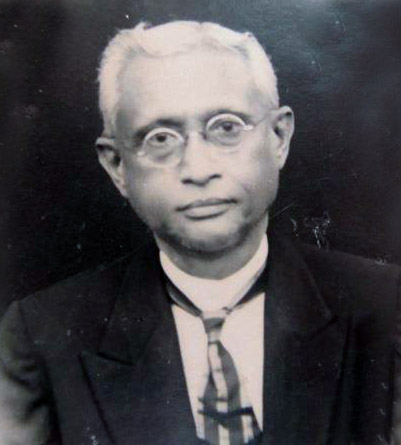
- Born: 15 October 1874; Jorhat, Assam
- Died: 26 October 1961 (aged 87)
- Occupations: Lawyer, tea cultivator, writer, poet, dramatist and lyricist
- Writing career
- Language: Assamese
- Notable awards: Sahitya Ratna, 1929

Chandradhar Barua (15 October 1874 – 26 October 1961) was a writer, poet, dramatist and lyricist from Assam of Jonaki Era, the age of romanticism of Assamese literature.

== Early life ==
Barua was born at Jorhat, Assam on 15 October 1878. He was second president of the Asam Sahitya Sabha in 1918 held at Goalpara. He was the founder secretary of Asam Sahitya Sabha Patrika, an official journal of the Asam Sahitya Sabha established at 1927 and held in that position till 1936. He also represented India at the Round Table Conference held at London in 1930.

== Literary works ==
Poetry Collections

- Ranjan,
- Bidyut Bikash,
- Kamrup Jiyori,
- Muktaboli.

Novel

- Shanti.

Dramas

- Meghnad Badh,
- Bhagya Porikha,
- Mughal Bijoy,
- Ahom Sandhya etc.

== See also ==
- Assamese literature
- History of Assamese literature
- List of Asam Sahitya Sabha presidents
- List of Assamese writers with their pen names
