= Sheela Borthakur =

Indian social worker (1935–2020)

- Born: 1935; Charangia Village, Jorhat district, Assam, India
- Died: 21 June 2020 (aged 84–85); Guwahati, Assam, India
- Other name: Cat
- Occupations: Social worker Littérateur
- Years active: 1945–2020
- Known for: Sadou Asom Lekhika Samaroh Samiti
- Spouse: Saranan Borthakur
- Children: 14
- Parent(s): Nabin Sharma; Pritilata Devi
- Awards: Padma Shri

Sheela Borthakur (1935 – 21 June 2020) was an Indian social worker, littérateur and the founder president of the Sadou Asom Lekhika Samaroh Samity (SALSS), a non governmental organization working in the socio-cultural and literary milieu of Assam. She served as the president of the organization for three terms, 1974 to 1976, 1990 to 1992 and 1993 to 1994 and as its general secretary for two terms, from 1976 to 1990.

== Life ==
Borthakur was born in 1935 to Nabin Sharma and Pritilata Devi at Charingia, a small village in Jorhat, in the Northeast Indian state of Assam but her early years were spent in Dhaka. She did her graduate studies at Jagannath Barooah College, and after her marriage to Saranan Borthakur, a dancer, she started her career as a teacher at Tezpur High School, but continued her studies to secure master's and doctoral degrees, her thesis being on Social Change in Assam. Later, she joined Darrang College as a lecturer of Philosophy and worked there till her superannuation from service. In between, when the first girls' college in Tezpur, Gopinath Bordoloi Kanya Mahavidyalaya, was started in 1979, she worked there as its founder principal. It was during her days at Darrang college, she proposed the idea of an independent literary organization for Assamese women in 1974 which paved way for the formation of SALSS. Her efforts were also reported in the organization of five adult education programmes in Tezpur and she was the editor of three books, composed of writings of Nalini Bala Devi, Dharmeswari Devi Baruani and Sneha Devi. The Government of India awarded her the fourth highest civilian honor of the Padma Shri, in 2008, for her contributions to society.

Sheela Borthakaur died on 21 June 2020 due to prolonged illness in Guwahati, she was 84 years old.

== See also ==
- Nalini Bala Devi
- Jagannath Barooah College
