= Assamese poetry =

Poetry in Assamese language

Assamese poetry is poetry in Assamese language. It borrows many themes from Sanskrit literature and is mainly devotional in tone. The origins of Assamese poetry are considered to have taken place in the early 13th century, the Bhagavat Purana is one of the most notable examples

== History ==
Sanskrit literature, the fountainhead of most of the Indian literature, supplied not only the themes of medieval Assamese literature but also has inspired many a writer of modern Assamese literature to undertake creative writings in the context of modern literary trends and styles. Literature starting with poetry in Sanskrit was mainly devotional in tone and tenor, and so does the Assamese version. Since all the adaptations are being rooted in Sanskrit, making no contrary to this Assamese literature (poetry) was at the devotional tone and tenor. The starting of Assamese Poetry is marked with the adaptation from Sanskrit puranas into Assamese by the poet-scholar Hema Saraswati in the early 13th century. His first adaptation was Prahlad-Charita adapted from Vamana Purana.

Starting with a very few adaptations, Assamese Poetry were of the devotional type in the very beginning. Later the adaptations got divided into two types – religious and secular. During the period of Vaishnavite revivalism, the secularism trend got into much demand. The Bhagavat Purana was considered to be the most important among all the puranas. Sankardev (1449–1568), the initiator of the Bhakti movement, started the process of translating and adapting different books and episodes of Bhagavat-Purana by rendering more than seven books (SKANDHA) and composed a few kāvyas basing on that. He was the introducer of BORGEET, the most initial form of Assamese poems. (There is still confusing to call them poems since they were sung with musical instruments like KHOL and TAAL).

== See also ==
- List of Assamese poets
- History of Assamese literature

== Sources ==
- Modern Assamese poetry, by Hem Barua. Pub. Kavita, 1960.
- History of Assamese literature, Birinchi Kumar Barua. East-West Center Press, 1965. Chapter VII: Poetry
- Sailen Bharali (1992). "Modern Assamese Literature". Modern Indian literature, an anthology, Volume 2. Sahitya Akademi. ISBN 81-7201-324-8.
- Mysticism in Indian poetry: a critical study of the Assamese mystic poets of the romantic age, by Kamal Narayan Choudhury. Punthi-Pustak, 1996. ISBN 81-85094-95-0.
