= Chandrakanta Abhidhan =

Assamese-to-English dictionary

Chandrakanta Abhidhan (Assamese: চন্দ্ৰকান্ত অভিধান, lit. 'Chandrakanta Dictionary') is an Assamese Language to English dictionary, the third one published. It contains 36,816 words and was originally compiled and published by Asam Sahitya Sabha in 1933.

In 1987, the Gauhati University published a third edition of this dictionary, edited by Maheswar Neog and Upendranath Goswami. Chandrakanta Abhidhan is available online since 2009.
