= Arts of Assam =

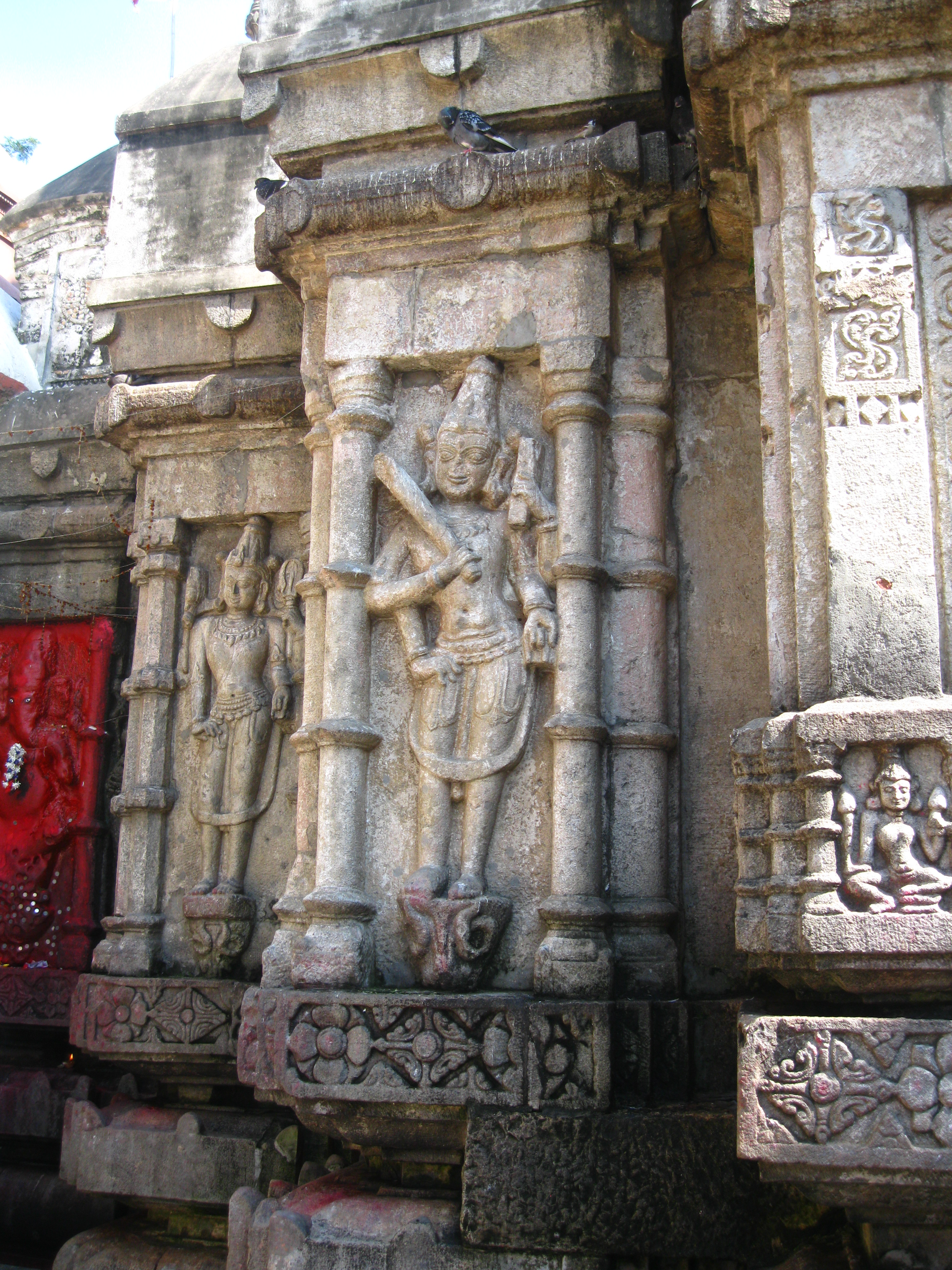
Medieval Assam stone sculpture

The fine arts of Assam has an extremely rich tradition.

== Sculpture and architecture ==
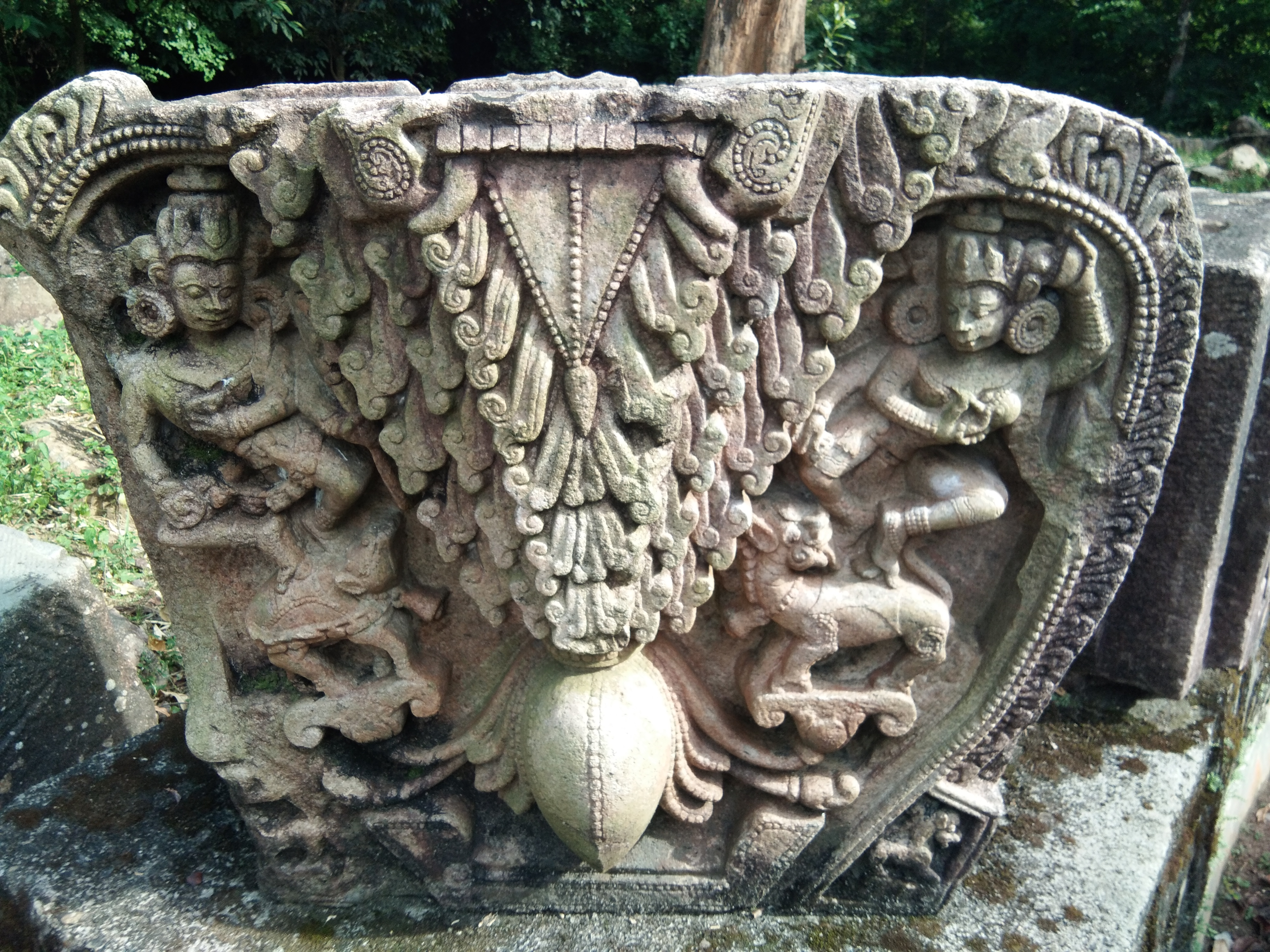
Ruins of Deopahar

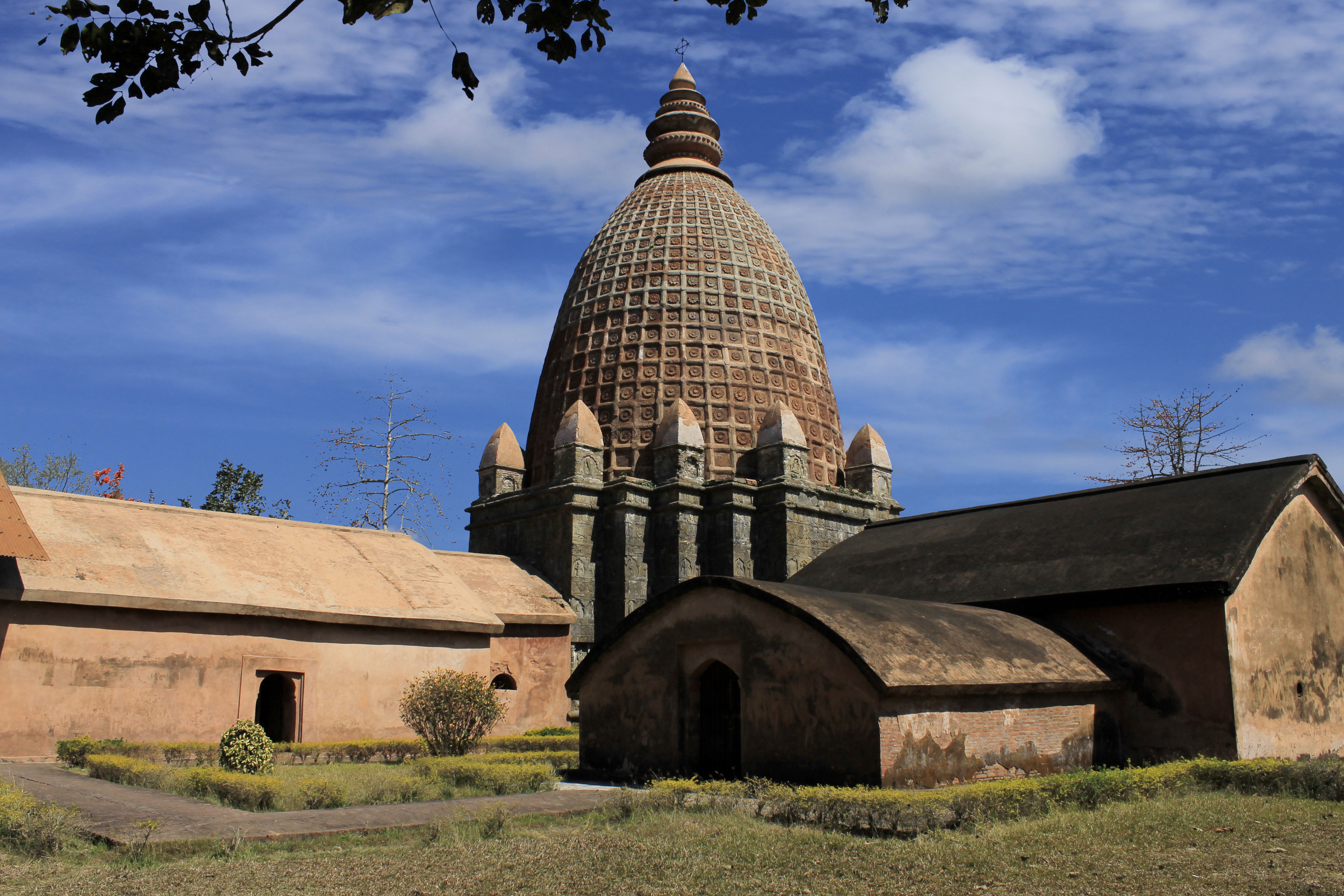
Late Medieval century Joy dol based on Nilachal architecture

The archaic Mauryan stupas discovered in and around Goalpara district are believed to be the earliest examples (c. 300B.C. to c. 100A.D.) of ancient art and architectural works. The monumental architectural remains discovered in Doporboteeya (Daparvatiya) archaeological site along with a beautiful doorframe in Tezpur are identified as the best examples of art works in ancient Assam with influence of Sarnath School of Art of the late Gupta Empire period. Gupta influence was prominent due to intense interaction of the then Kamarupa with the kingdom of Magadha. Many other sites also exhibit development of local art forms with local motifs and sometimes with similarities with those in the Southeast Asia. There are currently more than forty discovered ancient archaeological sites across Assam with numerous sculptural and architectural remains. Moreover, there are examples of several Late-Middle Age art and architectural works including hundreds of sculptures and motifs along with many remaining temples, palaces and other buildings. The motifs available on the walls of the buildings such as Rang Ghar, Joydoul, etc. are remarkable examples of art works.

== Paintings (an ancient tradition of Assam) ==
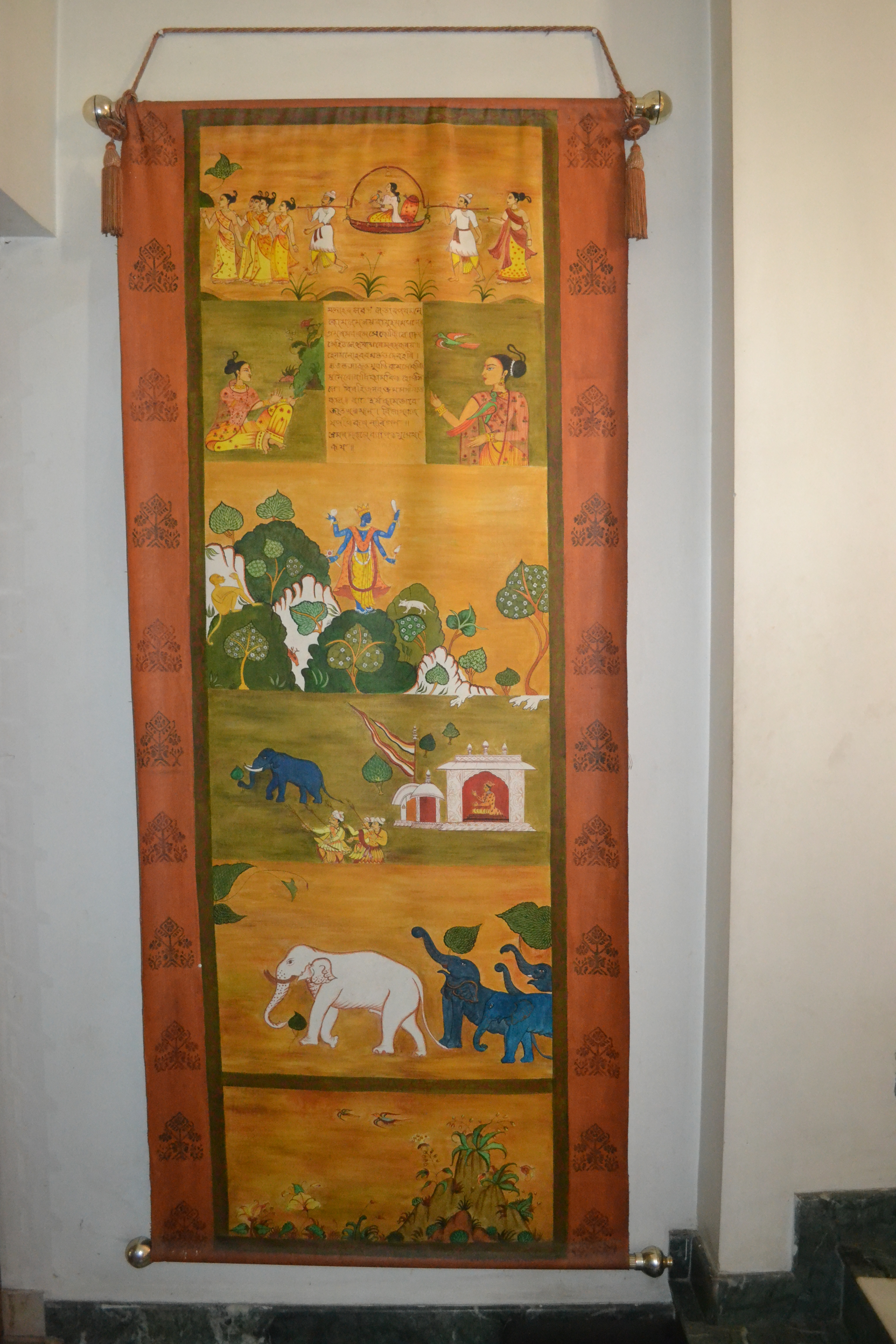
Traditional painting, Assam

Painting is an ancient tradition of Assam. The ancient practices can be known from the accounts of the Chinese traveller Xuanzang (7th century CE). The account mentions that Bhaskaravarma, the king of Kamarupa has gifted several items to Harshavardhana, the king of Magadha including paintings and painted objects, some of which were on Assamese silk. Many of the manuscripts available from the Middle Ages bear excellent examples of traditional paintings. The most famous of such medieval works are available in the Hastividyarnava (A Treatise on Elephants), the Chitra Bhagawata and in the Gita Govinda. The medieval painters used locally manufactured painting materials such as the colours of hangool and haital. The medieval Assamese literature also refers to chitrakars and patuas. Traditional Assamese paintings have been influenced by the motifs and designs in the medieval works such as the Chitra Bhagawata.

There are several renowned contemporary painters in Assam. The Guwahati Art College in Guwahati is one of the government institution for tertiary education. The Department of Visual Arts Assam University (Central University) is one of the only department of North East India which along with the specialization programme in Applied Arts, Graphics, and Paintings have PhD programme in Visual Arts. Moreover, there are several art-societies and non-government initiatives across the state and the Guwahati Artists' Guild is a front-runner organisation based in Guwahati.

== Ceramics ==
The Kumar and Hira communities of Assam have a tradition of Assamese pottery-making.

== Textiles ==
The Mising people, one of the larger indigenous groups in Assam, have a rich history of textile production. Designs in this tradition are often based on religious text and motifs from nature.
