= Naam Ghosa =

Assamese Hindu scripture

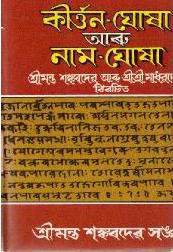
The Naam Ghosa with 1001 verses, along with the Kirtan Ghosha

The Naam Ghosa (Assamese: নামঘোষা; Nāma Ghosā), also known as Hajari Ghosa and Ghosha Sastra, is a Vaishnavite scripture composed by Madhavdeva (c. 1568–1596), the foremost disciple of Sankardeva, the founder of the Ekasarana Dharma movement in Assam. The work consists of nearly one thousand verses (ghosas) in praise of Krishna, emphasizing the chanting of the divine name (nāma) as the highest form of devotion in Kali Yuga.

== Development ==
=== Origin ===
According to tradition, Srimanta Sankardeva once instructed Madhavdeva to compose a scripture demonstrating the superiority of chanting the "divine name" over all other forms of worship in the Kali Yuga. He advised that the composition should be "simple and melodious, as soft as the flesh of a plum, yet firmly rooted in authoritative shastras so that even critics would find no fault in it." Following his guru's instruction, Madhavdeva began composing the work with what is now the third verse of the text. When he presented this to Sankardeva, the latter remarked that although the beginning was excellent, the "head" was missing, and then himself composed the first half of the opening verse. Madhavdeva then continued and completed the scripture, which came to be known as the Naam Ghosa.

=== Chronology ===
Of the 1001 verses in the Naam Ghosa, a substantial portion, about four hundred according to Maheshwar Neog and around six hundred according to Satyendranath Sharma, are considered translations from various Puranas. Scholars generally agree that the composition of the Naam Ghosa began during Srimanta Sankardeva's lifetime but was completed after his death by Madhavdeva. Contemporary biographies of Sankardeva do not mention the text's use in devotional chanting, indicating that it was finalized later.

=== Later manuscripts and editions ===
After Madhavdeva's death, his disciple Mathuradasa Ata of Barpeta possessed the only known manuscript. When Purusottama Thakur, Sankardeva's grandson, requested a copy, Mathuradasa refused, leading Purusottama to compose a similar but less influential text titled Na-Ghosa. A notable English translation of the Naam Ghosa titled "The Divine Verses" was produced by Soroj Kumar Dutta in 1997, with a second edition published in 2017 with an enriched glossary. A bilingual edition translated by Haramohan Das was released in 1957 by the Vaishnava Theological University, Vrindavan.

== Contents and philosopohy ==
=== Overview ===
The Naam Ghosa comprises 1001 verses and is organized into thematic sections that expound the philosophy and practice of the Ekasarana Dharma. The primary thematic divisions are devoted to the "Guru" (spiritual preceptor), "The Deity" (Hari/Krishna), "The Nāma" (the chanting of the divine names) and the "bhakta" (devotee).

Approximately one-third of the Naam Ghosa's content draws directly from Sanskrit scriptures, primarily the Bhagavad Gītā and the Bhāgavata Purāṇa while the remainder comprises Madhavdeva's original devotional compositions.

=== Rejection of Caste ===
In the Naam Ghosa, Madhavdeva strongly rejects the Caste system prevalent in his time. He argues that distinctions based on varṇa and āśrama arise from ignorance of the true spiritual nature of the self, which is identical in all beings. Every individual, he writes, is an aṃśa (part) of God, and thus equal in essence, regardless of social status or birth. Thus, since all living beings are inherently aṃśas of God, they cannot be hierarchically divided. In verse 670, Madhavdeva explicitly declares, "We are no members of the four castes nor followers of the four āśramas," marking one of the strongest rejections of caste distinctions in the Sankaradeva tradition.

=== Nāma-chanda ===
The last section, consisting of about 150 verses and titled Nāma-chanda ("A Meter of the Names"), is purely mystical in tone. Unlike the preceding portions, which are rich with theological arguments, this concluding part consists largely of the repetitive chanting of the divine names of Krishna (nāma-kīrtana). Scholar T. N. Sarma observed this transformation, noting: "....Towards the end of the book, however, the theologian is no more, the poet too sinks into the background, and it is the mystic alone who shines."
