= Miri Jiyori =

Book by Rajanikanta Bordoloi

- Author: Rajanikanta Bordoloi
- Language: Assamese
- Genre: Novel
- Publication date: 1894
- Publication place: Assam, India
- Followed by: Manomoti (1900)

Miri Jiyori (Assamese: মিৰি জীয়ৰী; literally: The Miri Maiden) is an Assamese novel written by Rajanikanta Bordoloi. The book focuses on Mising society customs and traditions. It is a social novel with a love story.

== Plot summary ==
Miri Jiyori (1894) is a love story by Rajanikanta Bordoloi set in the Miri (now referred to as the Mishing) community. A passionate story about doomed love, it was written at a time when the novel as a literary form was yet in a nascent stage. With a deeply sympathetic portrayal of a young Miri couple who matured from being childhood companions to a deeply committed but doomed couple in love, the novel is also a statement on the Mising community as well as a compassionate plea of humanism. (Note: this text is taken from Tezpur University website)

== Characters ==
- Panoi
- Jonkie
- Nirama (Panoi's mother)
- Tamed (Panei's father)
- Komud
- Dalimi
