= Mitradev Mahanta =

Writer, dramatist, historical researcher, freedom fighter and actor

- Born: 13 June 1894; Sorbaibondha, Jorhat, Assam
- Died: 26 March 1983 (aged 88)
- Occupations: Writer, Social Activist
- Writing career
- Language: Assamese
- Notable awards: Sangeet Natak Akademi Award

Mitradev Mahanta (1894–1983) was a noted writer, dramatist, historical researcher, freedom fighter and actor from Assam. He won the Sangeet Natak Akademi Award. He was the president of the Assam Sahitya Sabha in 1964 held at Digobi. He was born into Assamese at Letugram Xatra, Sarbaibandha at Jorhat, Assam on 13 June 1894.

== Literary works ==
Published Assamese Books

- Laklou Lani (লেকলৌ লানি) - 1915
- Biya Biporjoy (বিয়া বিপৰ্যয়) - 1924
- Gyan Lohori (জ্ঞান লহৰী) - 1924
- Chandrahar (চন্দ্ৰহাৰ) - 1925
- Dhurba (ধ্ৰুৱ) - 1925
- Mou Mohabharat - 1925
- Mohan Bhog (মোহন ভোগ) - 1925 etc.
- Niboka Roja (নিবোকা ৰজা) - 1928
