= Modern Assamese =

Assamese is part of the easternmost group of the Indo-Aryan languages. History of Assamese literature can largely be classified into three periods, including: Early Assamese period (6th to 15th century A.D.), Middle Assamese period (17th to 19th Century A.D.) and, Modern Assamese (late 19th century onwards).

== Beginnings ==
The history of Assam can be traced to the 4th century AD, though relics from beyond this period suggests some kind of a pre-history, through cave paintings, etchings on pots etc. The Charyapadas have almost been referred to as the earliest example of Assamese literature. The Charyapadas pertain to Buddhist songs penned within the period of 8th to 12th centuries. These writings, by the way, correspond to Oriya and Bengali languages as well. The phonological and morphological characteristics of these songs bear exceedingly powerful semblance with Assamese some of which are survive to this date. Despite the rich historical details of the pre-Ahom kingdom, literary history of Assam has been traced to the mystic lyrics, known as the "caryas" - esoteric doctrines and erotic practices of the later Sahajayana form of Mahayana Buddhism, written by 23 "siddha-purusas" (8th to 12th century AD). The oldest Assamese writer is Hema Saraswati of the late 13th century. His Prahlada-Charita based on the Sanskrit Vishnu Purana depicts a finished Sanskritized Assamese. Other poets in the court of Kamatapur like Harihara Vipra (Harivara Vipra) and Kaviratna Sarasvati rendered into Assamese, verse episodes from the Mahabharata in the early 14th century. Kaviraja Madhava Kandali in the 14th century is the first great poet of Assam. His extant work consists of a version of the Ramayana and a narrative poem Devajit. Another great poet was Durgavara who retold the story of the Ramayana in songs. A large group of manuscripts known as the "Mantras" of unknown authorship is extant probably going back to the period before 1500. The "Mantras" contain magical formulae against snakebite, against ghosts and demons and against various kinds of diseases.

Perhaps the most important contribution of the Ahom rule was the writing of the buranji a kind of prose history of the Ahom kingdom, which besides giving the accurate history of Assam also strengthened the tradition of the written word in Assam. The post of "Likhakar Barua" was specially created for the writing of manuscripts recording the proceedings of the various departments under the King's rule. Most of the manuscripts are written on sanchi leaves.

== Bhakti movement ==
The greatest period of Assamese literature was ushered in with the "Bhakti" movement started by the great Sankardev. To spread this movement a lot of literature was created, songs song, poems and chants. Shankari religion like Christianity, Islam, Judaism, Buddhism is again centered on the written word, in this case that of Srimanta Sankardev. The evening prayers in the "Namghar" or "The House of Praise" celebrate God through songs and chant or reading of sacred texts. Among the 27 works composed by him the most important are the last canto of the Ramayana, some portions of the Bhagvata Purana, Kirttanaghosha, Rukmini-harana, a narrative poem depicting an episode of the life of Krishna, the Bhakti-pradipa and the Nimi-nava-siddha-samvada. He also wrote a number of dramas that show a Maithili influence. Another kind of poetry introduced by him was "Bargeet", devotional poems, extremely popular to even this day. The father of Assamese prose literature Bhattadeva wrote three major books of Vaishnavism - Katha Geeta, Katha Bhagawat and Katha Ratnawali. He also penned other great books. The 17th century, is renowned for the growth and development of the "Charit Puthi" (biographies).

== Coming of the missionaries ==
It was only with the coming of the missionaries that the first printed book entered Assamese literary circles; the first printed book being the New Testament (Dharmapustakar Antobhag) printed by William Carey in 1813 with the help of Atmaram Sharma and in 1833 the entire Bible. As in the other parts of the country, the missionaries with their interest in propagating Christianity were the initiators in the establishment of the first printing press in Assam as well. Christianity being the religion of the book and the missionaries seeking easy accessibility to the locals, almost always learnt the local languages, translating the word of God (the New Testament more so than the Old Testament) for the use of the common people. For this purpose various pamphlets, magazines and other such media was also used.

In connection with the American Baptist Mission Press, which is the first press to be established in Assam, the first name that comes to the forefront is that of the Reverend Dr. Nathan Brown.

Nathan Brown was born on 22 June 1807 in New Ipswich, New Hampshire, USA. He graduated from Williams College in 1827 holding the highest position in the class. He married Eliza Ballard on 5 May 1830. For a few years, he was Associate Principal of Bennington Seminary and editor of a weekly newspaper called The Vermont Telegraph. He attended the Newton Theological Institute in order to prepare himself for work as a missionary. He graduated in 1832. The American Baptist Missionary Union appointed him as a missionary to Myanmar in 1833. He headed for Assam at the request of Captain Francis Jenkins, the Commissioner of Assam. This request was made in order to launch the "Shan Mission" aiming to help the British administration to enlighten, refine and educate the warrior tribes of Shan, Khamtis and Singphos. Brown and his associate Oliver Cutter along with their printing press sailed to Calcutta. After a stopover in Calcutta, they set out for Sadiya by river. A long, tiresome and dangerous trip brought them to their destination on 23 March 1836.

With the establishment of the first printing press in Assam, Brown's arrival ushered in an era of literary development in the region. Due to inadequate assistance from the Mission and due to tribal aggression in Sadiya, Brown had to shift his base to Joypur near Naharkatiya in 1839 and then to Sibsagar in 1843. He found Sibsagar to be a better place to work from. In fact Upper Assam is seen the hub of printing and the early birthplace of the printed book in Assam. He remained there until 1855. Towards the end of 1844, Brown travelled on foot from Sibsagar to Guwahati, visiting villages in order to study the diverse cultural backgrounds of the people. He along with two other missionaries, Miles Bronson and Cyrus Barker, organized and founded the first Baptist church at Panbazar in Guwahati on 25 January 1845. Brown also pioneered in establishing schools in different parts of the state. He established 14 Assamese medium schools in and around Sibsagar by 1846.

Rev. Nathan Brown's Grammatical notes of the Assamese Language first published in 1848 originally was not intended to be regarded as a grammar of the Assamese language but "they were commenced with the intention of printing only a few sheets, for private use of the most common grammatical forms". However this book soon served as the first Assamese grammar book. He wrote books on elementary arithmetic and geography which were much superior to Bengali books used in schools at that time. In this he was assisted by his wife Eliza, who was a translator in her own right. Brown was also a pioneer in the unearthing of old manuscripts and in editing and publishing them.

Brown was involved in teaching, translating and preparing books in Assamese. He translated and published a catechism in Assamese. Brown found that the Assamese Bible published by William Carey from the Serampore Mission Press, in circulation at that time, consisted of Bengali and Sanskrit loan words, so it was idiomatically inadequate. Therefore, he undertook the project of translating the Bible into pure and simple Assamese and published the New Testament in 1848, from his press. Brown was also a pioneer in writing school books. His books on elementary arithmetic called Pratham ganana (1845), Dutio ganana (1855) and geography called Bhugulor biboran (1851) were much superior to Bengali books used in the schools at that time. He also translated and published John Bunyan's Pilgrim's Progress into Assamese. Brown's wife, Eliza, also translated a dozen tracts into Assamese and wrote arithmetic textbooks and story books for children. Due to ill health and certain problems in Home Mission, Brown, after 20 years of successful service, left Assam on 13 February 1855 for US.

== Orunodoi era ==
Orunodoi was the first Assamese magazine, printed by the Baptist Missionary Press in Sibsagar; it was first published in January 1846. The tag line for the magazine was, "The Orunodoi, monthly paper, devoted to religion, science and general intelligence". It continued to be published until 1879; the press however was sold in 1883. The editors of this magazine include Dr. Nathan Brown, A.H Denforth, William Ward, Miles Bronson and others. Though propagation of Christianity remained the main aim of the paper, it contained other articles related to science, current affairs, astrology, history, and local trivia. This paper helped in entrenching the Assamese intelligentsia, bringing into the forefront three key figures of Assamese literary world, Anandaram Dhekial Phukan, Hem Chandra Baruah and Nidhi Levi Pharowal. The crowning glory of Brown's career was Orunodoi which means 'the dawn'. Brown did the editorial work whereas Oliver Cutter was involved in printing and publishing the magazine. Brown was the editor of this magazine until he left for US. Under his editorship, Orunodoi published history by bringing out the texts of old chronicles in properly edited form such as Chutia Buranji, Purani Asom Buranji and Kamrupar Buranji. He also patronized various Assamese scholars and helped them publish. Among these publications Kashinath Tamuly Phukan's Asom Buranji (1842) and Anandaram Dhekial Phukan's Axomiya Lorar Mitro (1849) and A Few Remarks on the Assamese Language and on Vernacular Education (1855), Bronson's A Spelling Book and Vocabulary in English, Assamese, Singpho and Naga (1839) printed at the Mission Press in Sibsagar are worth mentioning.

After Brown, the Orunodoi was in circulation with occasional breaks until 1880. Following the example of Orunodoi, several newspapers and magazines were published in Assam in the second half of the 19th century. Prominent among these were Asam Bilasini, (1871, published by Dharma Prakash Press, Auniati Satra, Majuli) Asam Darpan (1874, Tezpur), Asam Mihir (1872, Guwahati), Goalpara Hitshadini (1876, Goalpara), Chandrodaya (1876, Nagaon), Asam Dipak (1876, Guwahati) Jonaki (Calcutta, 1889) and Assam News (an Anglo-Assamese weekly, 1885, Guwahati), Assam Bandhu (1885, Nagaon), Mau (1886, Calcutta).

Oliver Thomas Cutter was born on 19 March 1811 at Lexington, Massachusetts. The American Baptist Missionary Union appointed him as a missionary printer and publisher to Burma at the age of twenty. With his wife, Harriet Low Cutter, he sailed from Boston in 1831, taking with him a steam printing press. He was joined by Nathan Brown and his wife Eliza Brown in Burma. The Cutters and Browns sailed for Assam in order to launch the Shan Mission. Jenkins, the commissioner of Assam also promised to contribute Rs 2,000 for a printing press. Cutter's main role was to print and publish books that were mostly translated or written by Brown. On arrival Captain Jenkins presented them a large printing press, and contributed Rs 500 for its support. They published Khamti, Singpho and Assamese books. Cutter's wife was actively involved in teaching in the school and preparing books for the press. Cutter went to Calcutta for a supply of additional type for his press.

After shifting their base to Joypur near Naharkatiya in 1839, Cutter became involved in establishing more Assamese schools and wrote a 252-page Vocabulary and Phrases in English and Assamese, published in 1840 from the Mission Press at Joypur. Looking for a more hygienic and conducive place for work, Brown shifted to Sibsagar in 1841 while Cutter continued at Joypur superintending the operations of the presses under his care. However tribal protest at the conversion activities carried on by the missionaries soon made Joypur an extremely difficult place to work in and also inconvenient for printing due to threats from the locals, for which Cutter had to hide his presses. Finally, in 1843 Cutter moved to Sibsagar and established the printing press along the bank of the Dikhow River near the cantonment. Along with Brown he was involved in translating and printing numerous and diverse books and pamphlets.

Apart from portions of the Bible, hymn books, tracts and school books in Assamese, a good number of other works were published under Cutter's care at the Mission Press. In 1853, Cutter left the mission work and joined as superintendent of the Government Press in Calcutta. Even today, the place at Sibsagar where Cutter established the printing press is locally known as Chapakhana. The Asom Year Book 2008 acknowledges Cutter, Brown and Bronson among the six foreigners (along with Edward Gait, John Berry White and Charles Alexander Bruce) who rendered benevolent service for Assam.

While Nathan Brown and Miles Bronson are well known for their contributions, however, a lesser known junior missionary, the Reverend William Ward, played an important role in propagating the printing of the book in Assam. Ward was born on 28 August 1821 at Sheffield, Ohio, USA. He graduated from Madison University in 1848. The American Baptist Missionary Union appointed him as a missionary to Assam. He and his wife, Cordelia, reached Guwahati in April 1851. He worked in Guwahati for the first six years and then another ten years in Sibsagar. Ward's wife, Cordelia, died in 1859 and he married one Susan, a missionary's widow in 1860. Ward was a linguist par excellence. He translated the books of Genesis, Exodus and Psalms of the Bible and published these from the Mission Press at Sivasagar. Ward revised the Assamese hymn book called Khristio Dharmageet for a new edition to which he added scores of original and translated hymns. In the fourth edition of the book published in 1890, sixty three hymns were credited to Ward.

Ward worked along with Nathan Brown in building up Orunodoi. He contributed many articles for this magazine and was also involved in editing and publishing it from 1861 to 1873. According to Hem Chandra Baruah's advice, Ward changed the system of orthography of Orunodoi from the previous and simplified one of Jaduram Deka Baruah that was adapted by Brown, to the Sanskrit system as it is used today. Replacing the dental 'n' by cerebral 'n' of Assamese alphabets, Ward corrected the spelling of Orunudoi in January 1861. This laid a milestone in the development of Assamese language. Ward's wife Susan was also associated with the Orunodoi magazine and edited a few issues of this magazine. She revised the missionary Oliver Cutter's wife Harriet Cutter's work Vocabulary and Phrases in English and Assamese (1841) and added many new vocabularies making it about 4500 entries published Brief Vocabulary in English and Assamese with Rudimentary Exercises in 1864 from Mission Press, Sibsagar. This was the first book of this kind until Bronson's A Dictionary in Assamese and English was published in 1867. She also authored A Glimpse of Assam (1884).

== Growth of printing in the 20th century ==
Printing and publishing began in Assam from around the end of the 19th century, a number of presses being established in Dibrugarh (also in Upper Assam). The first press in Dibrugarh was established by Radhanath Changkakoti, on 9 May 1881 called the "Radhanath Press". Shivnath Bhattacharya established the "Bhattacharya Press", around the same time, printing mostly school text books and religious books. Nandeswar Chakravarty, a tea planter set up the "Sadasiva Press" in 1905, while the "Ahom Press" established in 1910 was another important press. It was due to the effort of Chandra Kumar Agarwalla that the "Assam Printers and Publishers Limited" was formed, a joint company established along with Nimoni Phukan, Sadananda Dowerah, Lakshminath Phukan. The "Borooah Press" established in 1928 by Guna Govinda Borooah, "Bholanath Press" established by Bholanath Gohain, "Rajkhowa Press", "Jagaran Press" etc. were important presses established during that period. One of the first indigenous names of Assamese print is Anandaram Dhekial Phukan. Phukan (1829–1858) was a writer, government employee and supporter of the American Baptist Mission Press and of its leaders Brown and Bronson for their work in the propagation of Assamese. Phukan was a great scholar and studied English literature, was one of the first students of the school established by Francis Jenkins in 1835 and went on to study at Presidency College, Calcutta. He started his literary career at the age of seventeen by contributing articles to Orunodoi. He then wrote Axomiya Loraar Mitro, a textbook for schoolchildren modeled on English textbooks, publishing it from the Mission Press at Sibsagar. He wrote a pamphlet called A few remarks on the Assamese Language, and on the Vernacular Education in Assam printing 100 copies from the Mission Press and distributing it to various government officials for the purpose of putting forward the case of Assamese language.

Printing in Assamese became part of the greater movement against "foreigners". The identity crisis caused due to the removal of Assamese as official language of Assam in favour of Bengali, gave rise to a movement against "bohiragata", a resentment to the enforced language and a parallel struggle to regain the collective voice of a community. Uddipan Dutta says in his essay "The Growth of Print Nationalism and Assamese Identity in Two early Magazines", "Instead of the colonial economic exploitation, the Bengali linguistic hegemony was perceived as the real threat to the burgeoning Assamese nationality".

== Jonaki era ==
Jonaki Era, Age of Romanticism in Assamese Literature Jonaki era is also known as the age of Romanticism in Assamese literature. The Jonaki magazine, published by "probashi" Assamese students in Calcutta, was the result of this zeal. 'Bhāxār bikāx holehe jātir bikāx hobo' (The nation develops only when the language develops) was the slogan of the early Assamese intelligentsia and they began the process of standardization of the language by standardizing orthography, writing grammars and dictionary, and most importantly by using a standardized version in print. By the end of the nineteenth century the language spoken in Upper and Middle Assam became the accepted standard language of Assam as a direct intervention of this group of young men", writes Uddipan Dutta in the same essay. The students living in Calcutta at the end of the nineteenth century in various "messes" strove towards the development of the Assamese language. One issue of the magazine (Vol. 5, No. 7) relates the inception of the magazine as the outcome of the expat students' meeting on Wednesdays and Saturdays at 67 Mirzapur Street mess on Saturday 25 August 1888. Thus a committee was set up - Asamiya Bhasa Unnati Sadhini Sabha, the development of Assamese language and literature is the primary aim of the organization. For that purpose it strives to preserve the old Assamese texts available, to translate different important books from Sanskrit and other languages into Assamese which are not available in the mother tongue, to develop reading habit among the masses to introduce pure grammar and orthography instead of the impure orthography and grammar, and to create one standard written language all through the areas of Assam".

It was however, rather strangely a Marwari businessman from Tezpur who would finally come to the aid of the Sabha, which did not have the financial means to have the magazine printed. The "Agarwalla" family of Tezpur, is of course not an unfamiliar name in the world of Assamese literature, the most famous of them being the illustrious poet, writer, filmmaker, musician, freedom fighter Jyotiprasad Agarwalla (1903–1951). Haribilash Agarwalla (1842–1916), like the Baptist missionaries printed books in Assamese and his son Chandra Kumar Agarwalla became a leading literary figure in the late 19th and early 20th century, and it was Chandra Kumar Agarwalla who helped in printing, publishing and editing Jonaki. Chandra Kumar was himself a student of Presidency College, Calcutta and a member of the Sabha; it was also he who named the magazine Jonaki.

Chandra Kumar came forward to publish and edit the magazine on two conditions - that every member of the Sabha participate in the operational activities of the magazine and that every member should write an article for the magazine. Violation of any of these two conditions would result in a fine of Rs 15. The date of the first publication of the magazine is not mentioned in it. Only the Assamese month "Māgho" and the year of publication 1889 are mentioned. It is generally taken that 9 February 1889 is the first date of publication. We get conflicting figures on how many copies of the magazine were published and the year of its last publication. But the general consensus is that Jonaki was printed until 1898 from Calcutta: 11 issues in the first year, 12 issues in the second year, 10 issues in the third year, 11 issues in the fourth year, 7 issues in the fifth year, 11 issues in the sixth year, 6 issues in the seventh year, 1 issue in the eighth year, with the total number of 69 issues were published. Jonaki was again published from Guwahati in the year 1901 which continued until 1903. A pioneer in the journalism movement of Assam, Chandra Kumar started an Assamese weekly called Asamiya from Dibrugarh in 1918. From 1924, he published it from his newly established press at Kharghuli (Guwahati) called "Asamiya Press".

Bijuli (1891) meaning thunder is another important journal of this era, like Jonaki, it too was a student magazine being brought out from Calcutta by members of the Assamese Literary Club.

Banhi, meaning flute, a monthly periodical magazine was the brainchild of Lakshminath Bezbaroa, the celebrated littérateur; he was both the editor and publisher of this magazine, which was influential in propagating many influential writers and poets of Assam. The magazine was published from 1909 to 1940.

In 1848, Dr Nathan Brown serialized the Assamese translation of John Bunyan's Pilgrims' Progress in Orunodoi as Jatrikor Jatra. It was the first taste of a "novel" for Assamese readers. It came out in a book form in 1857. In 1854, another missionary translated into Assamese a Bengali novel with the title - Phulmoni Aru Karuna. In 1877, the first original "novel" in Assamese, Kaminikanta by A. K. Gurney, was published from the Baptist Mission Press. M. E. Lesley's Alokeshi Beshyar Bishay was also published in the same year. Gurney's Koni Beheruar Bishay came out the next year. All these books were written for the propagation of Christianity. They are called novels because they are continuous narratives with a unified theme. These can at best be called prototypes of novels and they helped in laying the foundation of the novel in Assamese literature. Padmanath Gohain Baruah's Bhanumati is generally taken to be the first "genuine" novel in Assamese, first serialized in Bijuli magazine from 1890 to 1891 Lakshminath Bezbaroa's Padumkuwori published in 1891 was the other important novel. Miri Jiyori (1894) is an important novel in Assamese, written by Rajnikanta Bordoloi, Bordoloi was a member of Axomiā Bhāxā Unnati Xādhini Xabhā. Bordoloi is more famous as the Walter Scott of Assamese literature, being a writer of historical novels, having spent much time as researcher for E. A Gait's A History of Assam.

The first English weekly The Times of Assam was printed from the "Radhanath Press" in Dibrugarh and the first issue came out on 5 January 1895. It was edited by Radhanath Changkakoti, who with the help of the Chief surgeon of Lakhimpur district, Dr. John Berry White set up the press. Dr. Berry White himself was a shareholder in this press, holding twenty five shares, while at his recommendation Mr. John Davidson, the Superintendent of the Upper Assam Tea Company also purchased twenty five shares. But Berry White left for England before the company could be consolidated and though it is rumoured that a press was sent by the man which was not delivered to Radhanath by the railway manager, however Radhanath set up the press with money collected from friends, the press sadly caught fire in 1883. However Radhanath started working to set up another press. In 1893, he went to Calcutta as a witness before the Royal Opium Commission, and while returning to Assam, collected enough money to publish a newspaper. He set up The Times of Assam with a sum of rupees six hundred. The paper was discontinued in 1947, unable to meet the competition of the nationalist Assam Tribune (4 August 1939, Baruah Press, Dibrugarh); the paper was also tainted as pro-British. Though it was revived for a while in 1948, by a Congressman Jivan Ram Phukan, yet the attempt was unsuccessful.

The First Assamese newspaper was Dainik Batori, published from the Thengal Bhawan, 8 km from Jorhat town on 12 August 1935. Tea baron Shivaprasad Barua started the paper. Earlier, too he had managed a paper called Sadinia Batori. When the Dainik Batori was started, Bagmibor Nilmoni Phukan was appointed as its editor.

"Though Nagarar Katha, a single-page local daily, was published by Mafajal Hussain (Baputa), which included only news pertaining to Jorhat town about one month earlier than the Dainik Batori, critics hesitate to consider it as a full-fledged daily newspaper. It was recognised as a local daily paper of the town".

Shivaprasad Barua bought a printing machine from Calcutta and appointed as many as 55 employees for the proper running of the paper. It consisted of eight pages. The length of the paper was 45 cm and the breadth was 30 cm. The symbol with a banana tree and a garland of flowers on the first issue of the paper was designed by Mahendra Deka Phukan. Inside the symbol the phrase "Aai! Tur batori pahare-bhoiyame, Jane-juriye bowak", meaning 'The news of Assam will reach everywhere, all the hills and dales in the State' was inscribed.

Two other important papers of the early 20th century Assam were Eastern Herald and Citizen.

== Dictionaries ==
Miles Bronson, an American missionary was the first to compile a dictionary of the Assamese language. His Dictionary published in 1867 at American Baptist Mission Press Sibsagar, is out of print now. Bronson's work was not really an etymological dictionary but contained a very considerable collection of words culled from the lips of local people but without derivations. Hem Chandra Baruah (1836–1897) was the first Assamese to compile an etymological dictionary called Hem Kosh of the Assamese language, published in 1900 under the supervision of Capt. P. R. Gordon, ISC 33 years after the publication of the Bronson dictionary. It contained about 22,346 words. It was published and is still under publication by the Hemkosh Printers. In 1873 he wrote a first Primer of the Assamese Language for which he obtained a reward of Rs. 500. He was the author of a treatise called "Notes on the marriage system of the people of Assam" and of two farcical plays the Kania Kirtan which exposed the vice of excessive opium eating, and Bahire Rangchang Bhitare Kowan Bhuturi which was a satire on the contemporary Assamese Society. Hem Chandra also edited the Assam News at Guwahati for some time.

The first Anglo-Assamese dictionary was compiled by a student of Cotton College in the year 1910, Makhan Lal Chaliha of Chiring Chapori, which was found in the British Library by a researcher of the Jatiiya Sikha Samanay Parishad. Under the guidance of Prof Sudmerson, the principal of Cotton College Chaliha completed the task in 1909 after putting in two years of effort. Chaliha however could not find a publisher for it. Nandeswar Chakravarty, the owner of "The Agency Company", a publishing firm, stepped forward to help him and printed the dictionary in his "Sadasiva Press".

The dictionary was appreciated by N.L Halward, the Director of Public Instructor for Eastern Bengal and Asom, and A Majid, the District and Session Judge and fellow of Calcutta University.

The third Assamese Dictionary Chandrakanta Abhidhan, a comprehensive bilingual dictionary with words and their meanings in Assamese and English, originally compiled and published by Asam Sahitya Sabha in 1933, 32 years after the publication of the Hem Kosh. The dictionary contains 36,816 words in all. A third edition of this dictionary was also published by the University of Guwahati in 1987 duly edited by Dr. Maheswar Neog and Dr. Upendranath Goswami. Another Assamese dictionary called Adhunik Asamiya Abhidhan has been published by Assam Prakasan Parishad in 1977 under the editorship of Dr. Maheswar Neog, Rajanikanta Deva Sarma and Nava Kanta Baruah.

== Recent developments ==
The Asam Sahitya Sabha with its motto "Chiro Senehi Mur Bhaxa Jononi" was established in 1917 for the propagation of the Assamese language and took up the publication of various books in Assamese. It still publishes important books in Assamese.

The Publication Board of Assam established in 1958 by a legislation of the Assam Legislative Assembly with the vision of publishing and editing books in the languages of the state (including Bodo, Mising, Kachari and other such languages), as well as English. Along with providing aid to authors, the board also helps in publishing rare manuscripts of historical, academic and cultural importance and also helps in preserving the originals, as well as reprinting classics, such as the great Sanskrit scholar Anandaram Borooah's English-Sanskrit Dictionary, Ancient Geography of India, Namalinganushashana, Bhabhabhuti and His Place in Sanskrit Literature, etc. and other such works, republished nearly a century after their first publication. The board has also worked on an Assamese Encyclopaedia. Among the most notable of the board's publications are the reproductions of Ahom and Shankari manuscripts. Also the Board published an influential magazine called Prakash. It was also instrumental in reissuing several of the Jonaki magazine copies, along with another influential magazine Banhi.

The printing and publishing industry in Assam is presently an ailing one, with most books being "outsourced" for printing to Calcutta and New Delhi and the quality of most local printing and publishing houses being called to question, various organizations are currently trying to remedy this situation.

== See also ==
- Assamese literature
- Dark Age of the Assamese language
- Colonial Assam
- Sankardev
- Lakshminath Bezbaroa
