= Anandaram Dhekial Phukan =

Indian writer (1819–1859)

- Born: 22 September 1829; Guwahati, Assam
- Died: 16 June 1859
- Occupation: Writer
- Relatives: Haliram Dhekial Phookan (Father)
- Writing career
- Pen name: A Native
- Language: Assamese
- Period: Orunodoi era of Assamese literature

Anandaram Dhekial Phukan (1829–1859) was one of the pioneers of Assamese literature in the Orunodoi era who joined in the literary revolution initiated by missionaries. He was remembered for his efforts in promoting the Assamese language. He played a major role in reinstating the Assamese language as the official language of Assam.

== Ancestry ==
Grandfather of Anandaram, Parsuram was the adopted son of Lakshminarayan, who was originally from South India. He could gain the favor of the Ahom king Gaurinath Singha (r. 1780–1795) and his ministers and was made the Duwariya Barua or Customs officers at Hadira-chowki or Ban-galhat outpost. His adopted son, Parsuram succeeded his to the post of Duwariya Barua. After Parsuram's death, his eldest son, Haliram succeeded him to the post of Duwariya Barua who was only 14 years of age. During the Burmese depredations of Assam, he fled to Company's territory in Bengal. After the defeat of Burmese in the Anglo-Burmese Wars, he returned and was in favor of British agent Sccot, he was appointed as the Dhekhiyal Phukan by Chandrakanta Singha and his brother, Janjaram as Kharghariya Phukan; Sccot recognised their positions. As after the conquest of Assam, it was divided into Senior and Junior division, he worked in the Senior division as Sheristadar. In 1832, he was made the Assistant Magistrate at Gauhati but died the same year.

Anandaram was born to Haliram and his first wife, Prastuti in 1829. Purandar Singha after the restoration of his kingdom, was made a tributary king in undivided Sivasagar and Lakhimpur districts, decided to rule the country in old traditional method and conferred the title of Dhekiyal Phukan on Anadaram.

== Early life and education ==
Phukan was born in 1829 at Guwahati in the Dhekial Phukan family. His father Haliram Dhekial Phukan wrote and published Asom Buronji and Kamakhya Yatrapaddhati in Bengali and distributed them freely. He also contributed to the Bengali magazine Samachar Chandrika. He had taken hisformal initiation from Kalidas Bhattacharya of the family of "Parvatiya Gosain" brought to Assam by Rudra Singha (r.1696–1714).

Anandaram started his school life in Guwahati. In 1841, the then commissioner Jenkins sponsored him to go to Calcutta and study in Hindu College. After studying for three years there, he came back to Guwahati and took further lessons in English from Mr. Blend. He also took up some lessons in Sanskrit and Urdu.

He got married in 1846 and took a government job the following year. He served as Dewan of the king of Bijani, Munsif, and Junior Assistance Commissioner, among other positions.

== Literary life ==
Anandaram Dhekial Phukan started his literary life at the age of 17. From then until his death his sole aim was the development of his land and its people, to the detriment of his own health, which led Col. Hopkins to compare him to the Raja Rammohan Roy of West Bengal.

In 1847, Anandaram published Englandor Biwaran (Description of England) in Orunodoi. In 1849, he published Asomiya Lorar Mitra (Assamese Children's Friend) in two volumes containing almost 400 pages, which is considered a milestone in the history of Assamese literature. In 1853, when Moffat Mills came to Assam to review the economic condition, Anandaram Dhekial Phukan presented him with a report written in lucid English describing the political and administrative situation of Assam, in-depth analysis of problems faced by the Assamese language and education system, and reasons and solutions to the poor economic condition of the Assamese people. He published another book, A few remarks on Assamese language, in English in 1855, in which he discussed the independent criteria of the language and the grievous outcome of imposing Bengali as the official language in Assam. This book mentions about 62 religious books and 40 plays. In addition, he started working on two dictionaries (Assamese to English, English to Assamese) and sent some parts of these to Orunodoi but their fate remains unknown.

His love for his motherland can be gathered from the following passage taken from his essay Englandor Biworon (Account of England):

"O Almighty Lord; enlighten them, so that they can learn their misery and wretchedness; with your magical powers, civilize them! Make them capable so that they can recognize your power and come under your sway. O dear lord! hasten and bring in a new era - when jungles of Assam will turn into flower gardens, when river boats will give way to steam ships, when mud houses will turn into concrete homes, when thousands of schools be established in villages, when gjan sabhas and hospitals will aid the poor, when violence will wither away and people will live in peace, love and harmony forever. |"

== Death ==
Anandaram Dhekial Phukan died at the age of 29 on 16 June 1859.

== See also ==
- Assamese literature
- List of people from Assam
- List of Assamese-language poets
- List of Assamese writers with their pen names
