= Asam Sahitya Sabha =

Literary organisation in Assam

- অসম সাহিত্য সভা
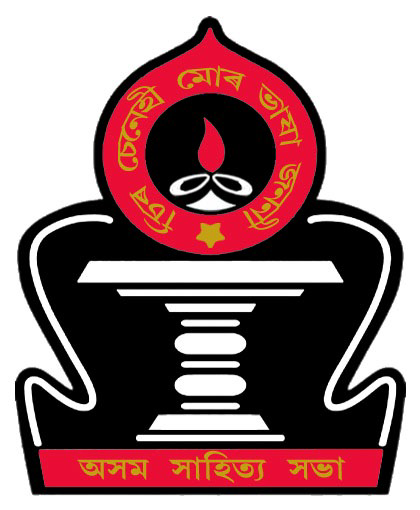
- Official emblem of the Asam Sahitya Sabha

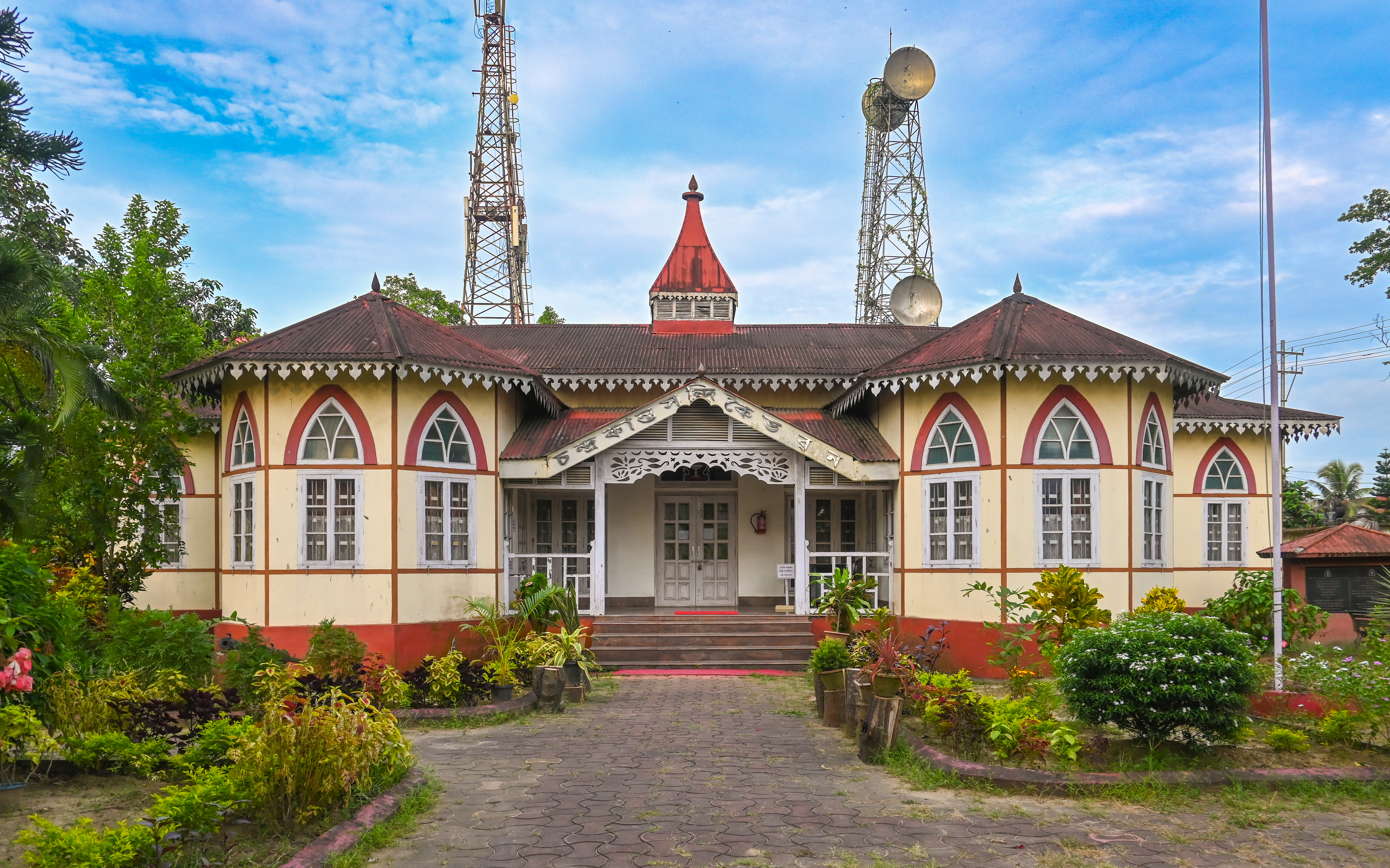
- Headquarters of the Asam Sahitya Sabha, Chandrakanta Handique Bhawan, Jorhat
- Nickname: The Literary Society of Assam
- Pronunciation: [ɔxɔm xaɦitːjɔ xɔbʱa]
- Predecessor: Asamiya Bhasa Unnati Sadhini Sabha
- Formation: 26 December 1917; 108 years ago
- Founders: Padmanath Gohain Baruah, Chandranath Sharma, and Sarat Chandra Goswami
- Founded at: Sivasagar, Assam Province, British India
- Type: Literary organization
- Legal status: Language regulator
- Purpose: Promoting the Assamese language, literature, and culture while fostering a sense of unity and pride among the Assamese people
- Headquarters: Chandrakanta Handique Bhawan
- Locations: Jorhat, Assam, India; Singapore, London, Phoenix, and Chicago
- Coordinates: 26.757891°N 94.209404°E
- Region served: Assam
- Official language: Assamese
- President: Basanta Kumar Goswami
- Vice President: Padum Rajkhowa
- Publication: Asam Sahitya Sabha Patrika
- Website: asamsahityasabha.in

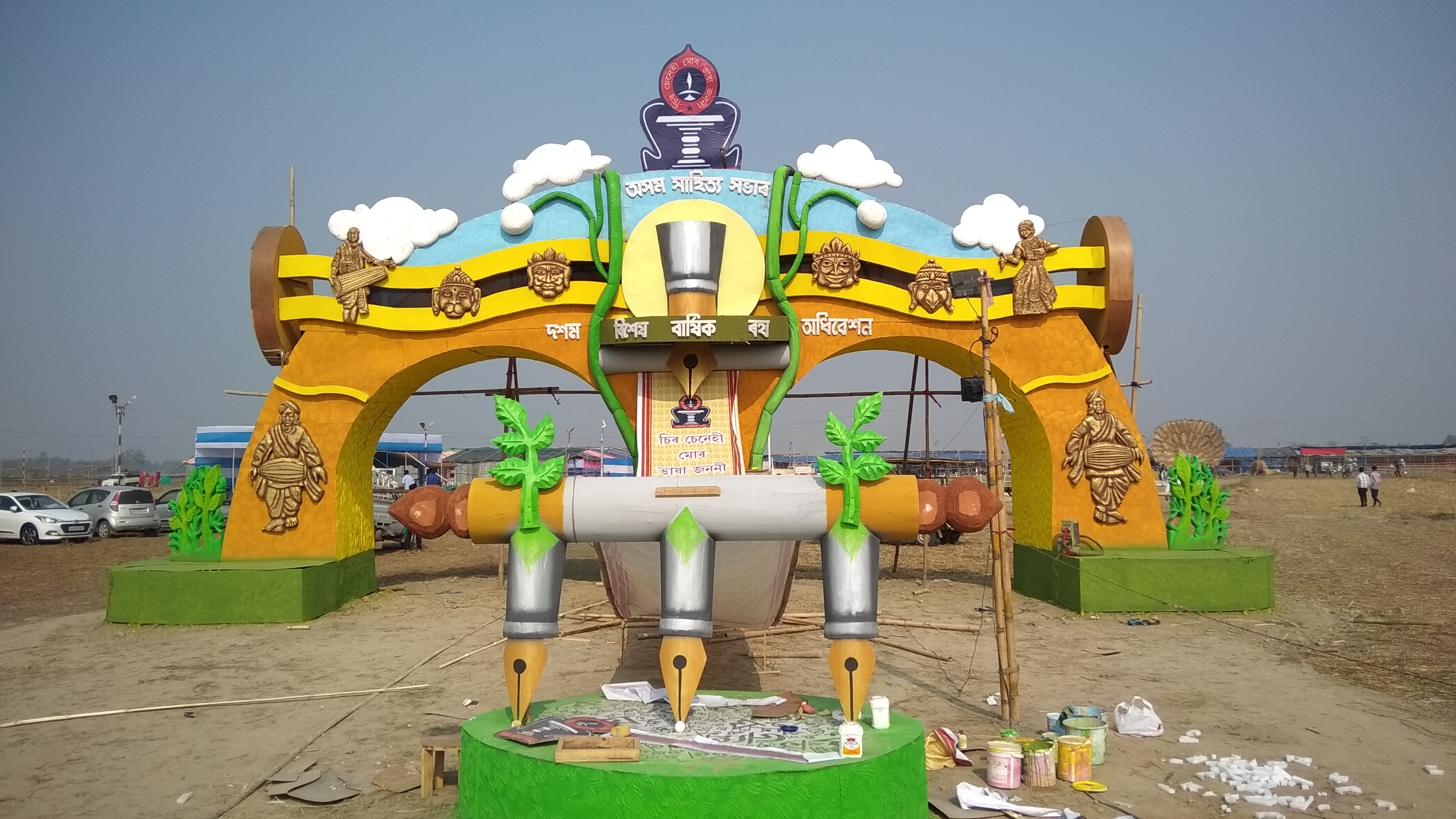
A picturesque image of main entrance of the 10th Annual Special Convention of Asam Sahitya Sabha held at Raha, Nagaon, from 1–3 February 2019.

The Asam Sahitya Sabha (Assamese: অসম সাহিত্য সভা, pronounced [ɔxɔm xaɦitːjɔ xɔbʱa], lit. 'The Literary Society of Assam') is a non-government, non-profit, literary organisation of Assam. It was founded in December 1917 in Assam, India to promote the culture of Assam and Assamese literature. A branch of the organisation named Singapore Sahitya Sabha was launched in Singapore on 28 July 2019. Other foreign branches are located in London, Phoenix and Chicago.

== History ==
Till 1826 AD, Assam Territory was ruled mainly by Kachari, Ahoms in the entirety of Brahmaputra Valley and Koch. In 1826, after the Treaty of Yandabo the administration of Assam was passed down to the British, till independence in 1947. Since then Assam has been an integral part of India.

However, the history of modern Assam, modern Assamese language and literature and culture found their starting points in the early part of the 19th century. Since 1872 some efforts were made to build up some organisations to work for the development of Assamese language, literature and culture of the modern period.

Before the formal formation of Asam Sahitya Sabha, Sahitya Kandari Padmanath Gohain Baruah had established Kohima Sahitya Sabha at Kohima, Nagaland, in the month of December 1895. Padma Nath Gohain Baruah was Founder Secretary and a Bengali Gentleman, Mr. Nabin Chandra Bhattacherjee was the Founder President. There was an Office Building at the Heart of the Kohima Town, which was known as "LAL GHAR" due to painting with Red color. ( See Mor Xuworon, biography of Padma Nath Gohain Baruah). Late Govinda Chandra Paira, Dhan Bahadur Sonar and Hari Prasad Gorkha Rai were the main product of Kohima Sahitya Sabha, who were Honored by awarding Literary Pension by the Assam Government. The Kohima Sahitya Sabha is still alive (till November 2013). It has an own Bhawan at P.R.Hill, Kohima, Opposite Nagaland Police Headquarters. The Bhawan was exchanged by the Nagaland Government with the earlier one, which was known as LAL GHAR and taken by the Nagaland Government in the year 1978.

Assamese literature অসমীয়া সাহিত্য
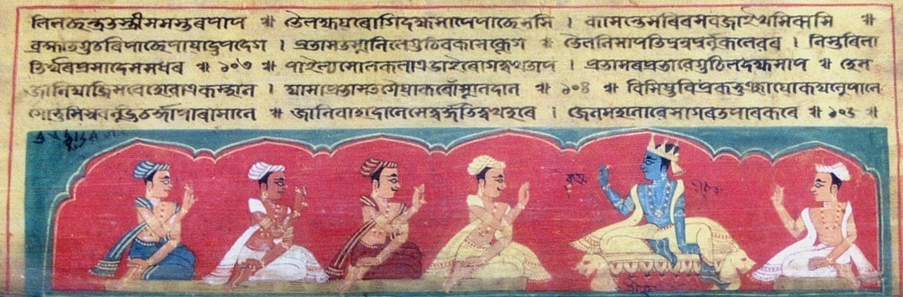
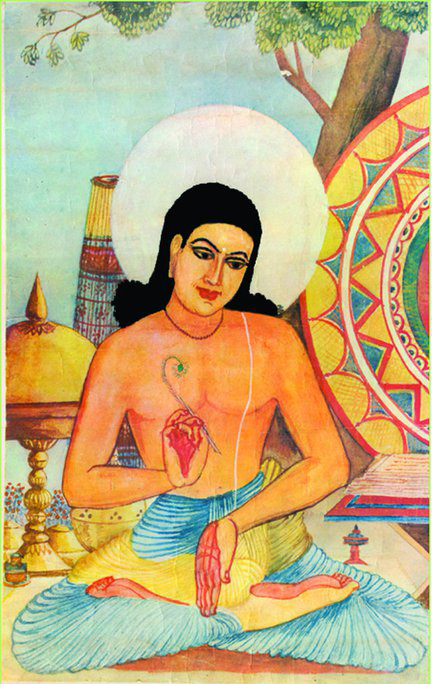
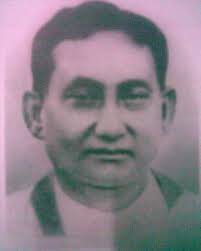
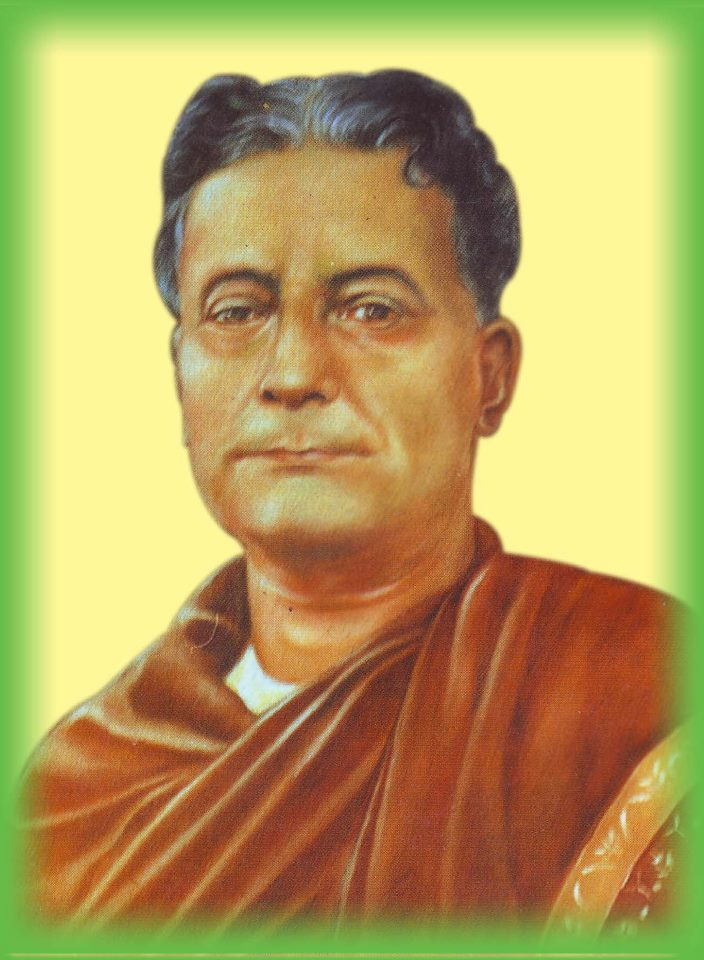
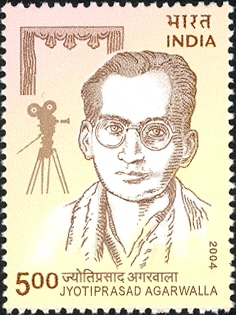
- Assamese literature (by category); Assamese

Assamese literary history
- History of Assamese literature

Assamese language authors
- List of Assamese writers

Assamese writers
- Dramatists & playwrights • Poets • Writers

Forms
- Books – Poetry; Ankia Naats – Bhaona – Borgeets – Buranjis

Institutions & awards
- Asam Sahitya Sabha; Assam Lekhika Samaroh Samiti; Assam Ratna; Assam Valley Literary Award; Kamal Kumari National Award

== Sahitya Sabha festivals ==
The conference of the Asam Sahitya Sabha is held biennially. First conference of Asam Sahitya Sabha was held at Sivasagar, Assam. Except regular biennially seasons in 2000 and 2002 special session was held at Jorhat and Kalgachia. On 31 January–4 February 2013 at Biswaratna Dr. Bhupen Hazarika Samannay Khetra, Barpeta Road, an administrative circle of Barpeta District of Assam. The Sabha's 2015 session held at Kaliabor, Nagaon. The current conference will be held in Padmanath Gohain Baruah Khetra, Rupahi-Jerenga Pathar, Rudrasagar, Sivasagar from 8 to 12 February 2017.

== Asam Sahitya Sabha Patrika ==
Asam Sahitya Sabha Patrika (Ôxôm Xahityô Xôbha Pôtrika) is an official journal of the Asam Sahitya Sabha. The first issue appeared in October 1927. Chandradhar Barua was the founder editor of the journal.

== Objectives ==
1. To make all round development of the Assamese language, literature and the culture of the State.
2. Publications of Dictionary, Research works, monographs on languages, literature, culture, tribes and races etc., books on literary criticism, complete works of the great writers of Assam etc.
3. To enquire, collect and research on ancient literature of the State of Assam.
4. To provide financial help to the deserving writers who cannot afford to publish their books and literature for financial stringency.
5. To promote music, art and sculpture of the State.
6. To bring out leaflets, pamphlets etc. in order to publicize the Assamese language and literature.
7. To promote exchange plans and schemes between Literature and Culture.
8. To do such work which helps in expanding development of Assamese Language, Literature and Culture.

== Presidents ==
The first president of Asam Sahitya Sabha was Padmanath Gohain Baruah during the inaugural conference at Sibsagar in 1917.

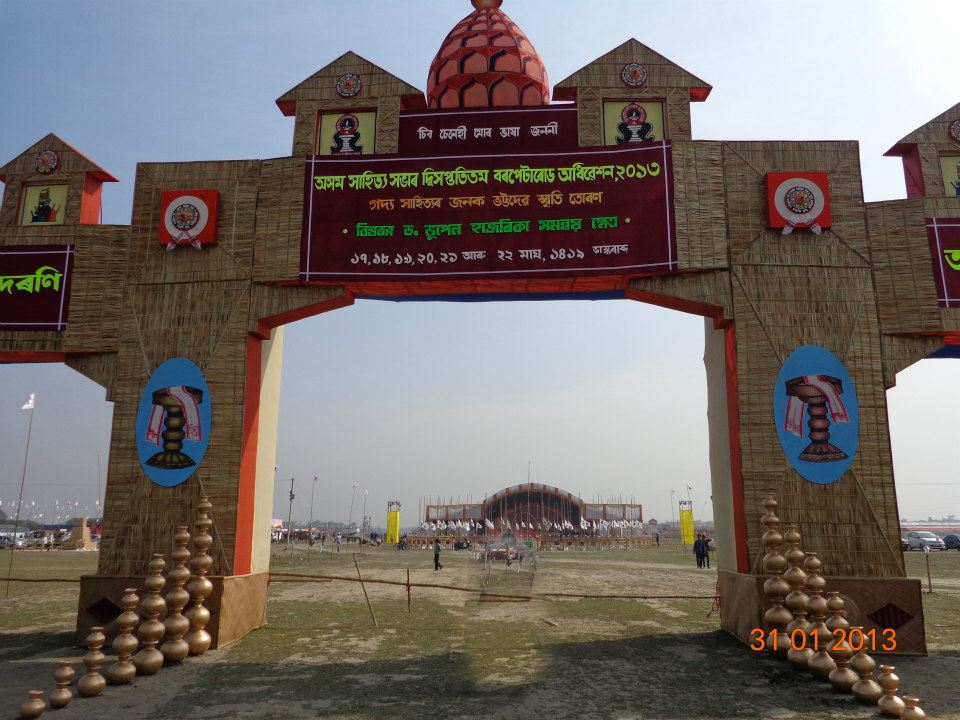
Entrance of Asam Sahitya Sabha Adhibeshan, Barpetaroad, 2013

== The Theme Song ==
The main theme song "Siro Senehi Mur Bhaxa Jononi" was written by Mitradev Mahanta, and the tune and music was done by his student Dorponath Sarma.

== See also ==
- Asam Sahitya Sabha Patrika
- List of Asam Sahitya Sabha
- Asamiya Bhasa Unnati Sadhini Sabha
- Asom Sahitya Sabha presidents Category
- Assamese literature
- Assamese Language Movement
- Bodo Sahitya Sabha
- Manipuri Sahitya Parishad
- Sadou Asom Lekhika Samaroh Samiti
