= Asamiya Bhasa Unnati Sadhini Sabha =

Asamiya Bhasa Unnati Sadhini Sabha (Assamese: অসমীয়া ভাষা উন্নতি সাধিনী সভা, pronounced [ɔxɔmija bʱaxa unːɔti xadʱini xɔbʱa], lit. 'Assamese Language Development Society') was a literary organization founded on Saturday 25 August 1888 (1810 Saka). Its primary objective was the development of Assamese language and literature. It is regarded as the precursor of the Asam Sahitya Sabha. The first secretary of this society was Shivaram Sarma Bordoloi.

== History ==
In the 8th decade of the 19th century the Assamese students studying in Calcutta took the Assamese language as the most important unifying factor for the formation of an Assamese nationality. Initially they formed messes in 50 Sitaram Ghosh Street and 62 Sitaram Ghosh Street in Calcutta. As the influx of students increased, the number of messes was also increased. Some important messes added later were 67 Mirzapur Street, 107 Amherst Street, 14 Pratap Chandra Lane, Eden Hospital Street mess, etc. They initiated a number of inter-mess activities. Among them, the most crucial one was the Tea Party, a social gathering over a cup of tea on every Wednesday and Saturday. They used to discuss various topics in this Tea Party and this is how the concept of Asamiya Bhasa Unnati Sadhini Sabha was mooted on Saturday 25 August 1888 (1810 Saka), at the 67 Mirzapur Street mess and this Tea Party was converted into a literary organization.

== Objectives ==
The objective of the society was elaborately discussed in the magazine Jonaki (Vol 5, No. 7) under the title "Axomiā Bhāxā Unnati Xādhini Xabhār Karjya Biboroni". It is as follows (English translation: Uddipan Dutta)-

The objective of the Sabha is to find out solutions as to how an infant mother tongue would grow; how would it equalize the other rich and developed languages of the world and brighten the poors and gloomy face of Assam; how would it grow from the present weak and sick status to a healthy state. The development of Assamese language and literature is the primary aim of the organization. For that purpose it strives to preserve the old Assamese texts available, to translate different important books from Sanskrit and other languages into Assamese which are not available in the mother tongue, to develop reading habit among the masses to introduce pure grammar and orthography instead of the impure orthography and grammar, and to create one standard written language all through the areas of Assam.

== Some other activities ==
=== Publishing Jonaki ===
Among many other important decisions taken by the society, one was to publish a new monthly magazine and this is how Jonaki was born in 1889. The aim and objectives of the society was regularly discussed on the pages of Jonaki.

=== Baan theatre ===
Assamese actors initially staged plays alongside Bengali actors under the aegis of the Bengali Amateur Theatre Party. In 1903, a division of opinions among the artists from the two linguistic groups led the Assamese artists to the formation of the Baan theatre. In 1906 the society decided to have a theatre exclusively for Assamese plays.

== People associated with the society ==
Here is a list of those who played a pivotal role in the early imagination of Assamese identity.

- From the 50 Sitaram Ghosh Street mess: Benudhar Rajkhowa, Dalimchandra Bora, Lakshiprasad Chaliha, Ramakanta Baruah, Krishnaprasad Duwara, Ramakanta Barkakoti, Gunindranath Baruah, Golapalchandra Baruah, Gunjanan Baruah etc.
- From the 62 Sitaram Gosh Street mess: Lakhyeswar Sarma, Tirthanath Kakoti, Hemchandra Goswami, Kanaklal Baruah, Krishna Kumar Baruah, Chandra Kamal Bezbaruah, Ghanashyam Baruah, Kamalchandra Sarma and Lakshminath Bezbaroa etc.

== See also ==
- Orunodoi
- Jonaki
- Asam Sahitya Sabha
- Assamese Language Movement
- Bodo Sahitya Sabha
- Manipuri Sahitya Parishad
