= Orunodoi =

Assamese-language periodical

- A layout of the magazine
- Former editors: Previous editors Dr. Nathan Brown; A.H. Denforth; Miles Bronson; William Ward; Ms Susane
- Categories: Current affairs & Literature
- Frequency: Monthly
- Circulation: 700
- Publisher: Oliver Thomas Cutter
- First issue: January 1846; 180 years ago
- Final issue: January 1883; 143 years ago
- Company: Baptist Missionary Printing Press
- Country: India
- Based in: Sibsagar, Assam
- Language: Assamese

Orunodoi or Arunodoi (Assamese: অৰুণোদই, English: "Sunrise") was the first Assamese-language magazine published monthly from Sibsagar, Assam, in 1846. The magazine created a new era in the world of Assamese literature and gave birth to notable authors such as Anandaram Dhekial Phukan, Hemchandra Barua, Gunabhiram Barua, and Nidhi Levi Farwell. The magazine took the initiative of innovating the then Assamese dialect instead of borrowing words from other languages. The Assamese people got to know about the western world only through this magazine, which opened the gate to the modern literacy in Assam. It mainly included various news related to current affairs, Science, astrology, history and also trivia although Christianity was its main aim. The magazine's publishing ended when the printing press was sold in 1883.

== History ==
Orunodoi was founded by Dr. Nathan Brown and was first published in January 1846, printed by the Baptist Missionary Press in Sibsagar. The tag line for the magazine was, "The Orunodoi, monthly paper, devoted to religion, science and general intelligence". It continued to be published till 1879, the press, however, was sold in 1883. The editors of the magazine include Dr. Brown, A. H. Denforth, William Ward, and others. It contained articles related to science, current affairs, astrology, history, and local trivia. This paper helped to entrench the Assamese intelligentsia, bringing to the fore three key figures from the Assamese literary world: Anandaram Dhekial Phukan, Hem Chandra Baruah and Nidhi Levi Farwell. The crowning glory of Brown's career was Orunodoi which means ‘the dawn’. Brown did the editorial work whereas Oliver Cutter was involved in printing and publishing the magazine. Brown was the editor of this magazine till he left for the US. Under his editorship, Orunodoi published history by bringing out the texts of old chronicles in properly edited form, such as Chutia Buranji, Purani Asom Buranji and Kamrupar Buranji. He also patronized various Assamese scholars and helped them publish. Notable among these publications are Kashinath Tamuly Phukan's Asom Buranji (1842) and Anandaram Dhekial Phukan's Axomiya Lorar Mitro (1849) and A Few Remarks on the Assamese Language and on Vernacular Education (1855), Bronson's A Spelling Book and Vocabulary in English, Assamese, Singpho and Naga (1839) printed at the Mission Press in Sibsagar.

After Brown, the Orunodoi was in circulation with occasional breaks until 1880. Following the example of Orunodoi, several newspapers and magazines were published in Assam in the second half of the 19th century. Prominent among these were Asam Bilasini, (1871, published by Dharma Prakash Press, Auniati Satra, Majuli) Asam Darpan (1874, Tezpur), Asam Mihir (1872, Guwahati), Goalpara Hitshadini(1876, Goalpara), Chandrodaya (1876, Nagaon), Asam Dipak(1876, Guwahati) Jonaki (Calcutta, 1889) and Assam News (an Anglo-Assamese weekly, 1885, Guwahati), Assam Bandhu (1885, Nagaon), Mau (1886, Calcutta).

It (Orunodoi) explained global geography and gave descriptions of the night sky with its stars and planets. The news of great events in India and in foreign countries were brought to the door of the Assamese even as they took place. They could have the intelligence of scientific inventions and discoveries in a simple and digestive form. Beyond all these somewhat startling matters, looking like coming from another world, which tended to reshape the Assamese mind, there were 'newsy' and 'sensational' matters from a familiar sphere meaning from different parts of Assam. The mind of the readers was thus treated to a very much rich fare.

— Maheswar Neog, Bhagavati Prasad Baruva: Writings of and on Him, 1983

Oliver Thomas Cutter was born on 19 March 1811 at Lexington, Massachusetts, USA. The American Baptist Missionary Union appointed him as a missionary printer and publisher to Burma at the age of twenty. With his wife, Harriet Low Cutter, he sailed from Boston in 1831, taking with him a steam printing press. He was joined by Nathan Brown and his wife Eliza Brown in Burma. The Cutters and Browns sailed for Assam in order to launch the Shan Mission. Jenkins, the commissioner of Assam also promised to contribute Rs 2,000 for a printing press. Cutter's main role was to print and publish books that were mostly translated or written by Brown. On arrival Captain Jenkins presented them a large printing press, and contributed Rs 500 for its support. They published Khamti, Singpho and Assamese books. Cutter's wife was actively involved in teaching in the school and preparing books for the press. Cutter went to Calcutta for a supply of additional type for his press.

After shifting their base to Joypur near Naharkatiya in 1839, Cutter became involved in establishing more Assamese schools and wrote a 252-page Vocabulary and Phrases in English and Assamese, published in 1840 by the Mission Press at Joypur. Looking for a more hygienic and conducive place for work, Brown shifted to Sibsagar in 1841, while Cutter continued at Joypur superintending the operations of the presses under his care. However tribal protest at the conversion activities carried on by the missionaries soon made Joypur an extremely difficult place to work in and also inconvenient for printing due to threats from the locals, for which Cutter had to hide his presses. Finally, in 1843 Cutter moved to Sibsagar and established the printing press along the bank of the Dikhow River near the cantonment. Along with Brown he was involved in translating and printing numerous and diverse books and pamphlets.

Apart from portions of the Bible, hymn books, tracts and school books in Assamese, a good number of other works were published under Cutter's care at the Mission Press. In 1853, Cutter left the mission work and joined as superintendent of the Government Press in Calcutta. Even today, the place at Sibsagar where Cutter established the printing press is locally known as Chapakhana. The Asom Year Book 2008 acknowledges Cutter, Brown and Bronson among the six foreigners (along with Edward Gait, John Berry White and Charles Alexander Bruce) who rendered benevolent service for Assam.

While Nathan Brown and Miles Bronson are well known for their contributions, however, a lesser known junior missionary, the Reverend William Ward, played an important role in propagating the printing of the book in Assam. Ward was born on 28 August 1821 at Sheffield, Ohio, USA. He graduated from Madison University in 1848. The American Baptist Missionary Union appointed him as a missionary to Assam. He and his wife, Cordelia, reached Guwahati in April 1851. He worked in Guwahati for the first six years and then another ten years in Sibsagar. Ward's wife, Cordelia, died in 1859 and he married one Susan, a missionary's widow in 1860. Ward was a linguist par excellence. He translated the books of Genesis, Exodus and Psalms of the Bible and published these from the Mission Press at Sivasagar. Ward revised the Assamese hymn book called Khristio Dharmageet for a new edition to which he added scores of original and translated hymns. In the fourth edition of the book published in 1890, sixty three hymns were credited to Ward.

Ward worked along with Nathan Brown in building up Orunodoi. He contributed many articles for this magazine and was also involved in editing and publishing it from 1861 to 1873. According to Hem Chandra Baruah’s advice, Ward changed the system of orthography of Orunodoi from the previous and simplified one of Jaduram Deka Baruah that was adapted by Brown, to the Sanskrit system as it is used today. Replacing the dental ‘n’ by cerebral ‘n’ of Assamese alphabets, Ward corrected the spelling of Orunudoi in January 1861. This laid a milestone in the development of Assamese language. Ward's wife Susan was also associated with Orunodoi and edited a few issues of the magazine. She revised the missionary Oliver Cutter's wife Harriet Cutter's work Vocabulary and Phrases in English and Assamese (1841) and added many new entries, bringing the total to about 4500 entries, published as Brief Vocabulary in English and Assamese with Rudimentary Exercises in 1864 by Mission Press, Sibsagar. It was the first book of this kind till Bronson's A Dictionary in Assamese and English was published in 1867. She also authored A Glimpse of Assam (1884).

== See also ==
- Jonaki
