= Assamese literature =

Literature in Assamese language

Assamese literature অসমীয়া সাহিত্য
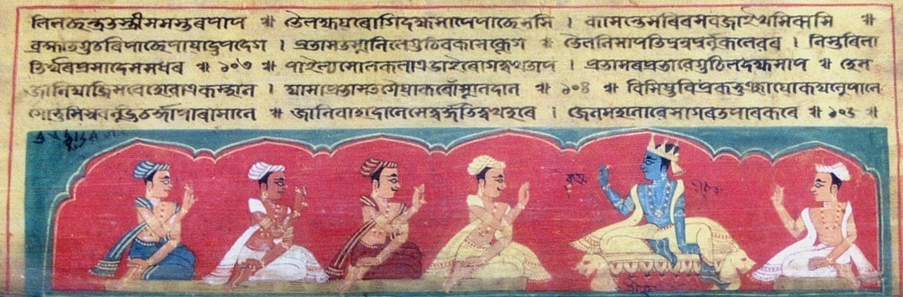
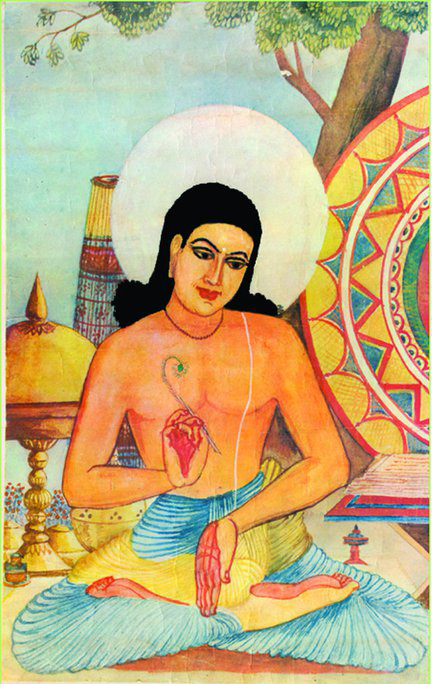
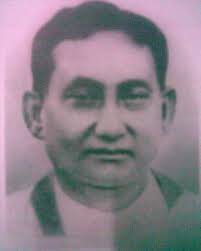
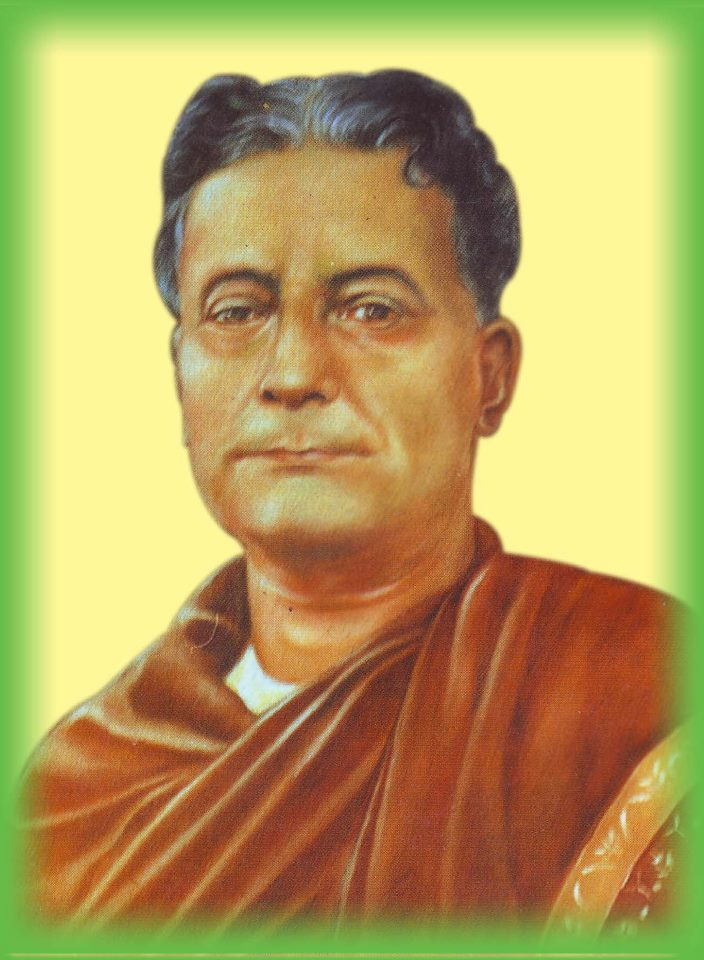
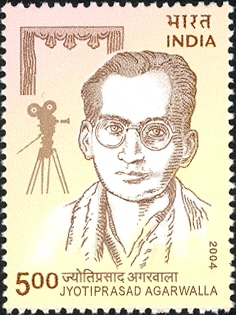
- Assamese literature (by category); Assamese

Assamese literary history
- History of Assamese literature

Assamese language authors
- List of Assamese writers

Assamese writers
- Dramatists & playwrights • Poets • Writers

Forms
- Books – Poetry; Ankia Naats – Bhaona – Borgeets – Buranjis

Institutions & awards
- Asam Sahitya Sabha; Assam Lekhika Samaroh Samiti; Assam Ratna; Assam Valley Literary Award; Kamal Kumari National Award

Assamese literature (Assamese: অসমীয়া সাহিত্য, pronounced [ɔxɔmia xaɦitjɔ]) is the entire corpus of poetry, novels, short stories, plays, documents and other writings in the Assamese language. It also includes the literary works in the older forms of the language during its evolution to the contemporary form and its cultural heritage and tradition. The literary heritage of the Assamese language can be traced back to the c. 9–10th century in the Charyapada (IAST: caryāpada), where the earliest elements of the language can be discerned.

Banikanta Kakati divides the history of Assamese literature into three prominent eras—Early Assamese, Middle Assamese and Modern Assamese—which is generally accepted.

== Ancient era: Literature of the beginning period, 950–1300 AD ==
- Charyapada
- Mantra Sahitya

== Medieval era: 1300–1826 AD ==
- 1st period: Pre-Shankari literature, 1300–1490 AD
- 2nd period: Shankari literature, 1490–1700 AD
- 3rd period: Post-Shankari literature, 1700–1826 AD

== Modern era: 1826 AD–present ==
- 1st period: Missionary literature, 1826–1870 AD
- 2nd period: Hemchandra-Gunabhiram Barua's era, 1870–1890 AD
- 3rd period: Romantic era or Bezbaruah's era, 1890–1940 AD
- 4th period: Current period, 1940 AD–present

== History ==
=== Old Assamese ===
The first reference to the language of Assam was found in the account of famous Chinese monk-cum-traveler Huen Tsang. He visited the Kamarupa Kingdom (Kāmarūpa) during the reign of Bhaskaravarman of Varman dynasty. While visiting Kamrupa in seventh century, Xuanzang noted that the language of the region was slightly different from the language of Middle India (Magadha). He was able to identify the phonetic differences evident in the region. Even though systematic errors in the Sanskrit of Kamarupa inscriptions portray an underlying Pakrit in the pre-12th century period, scarce examples of the language exist. The Charyapadas, the Buddhist ballads of 8th-10th century some of whose composers were from Kamarupa and the language of which bear strong affinities with Assamese (besides Bengali, Maithili and Oriya), are considered the first examples of Assamese literature. The spirit of the Charyapadas are found in later-day Deh-Bicharor Geet (dehavicārar gīta) and other aphorisms; and some of the ragas found their way to the 15th-16th century Borgeets. In the 12th-14th century period the Bengali works of Ramai Pandit (Sunya Puran), Boru Chandidas (Krishna Kirtan), Sukur Mamud (Gopichandrar Gan), Durlabha Mallik (Gobindachandrar Git) and Bhavani Das (Mainamatir Gan) bear strong grammatical relationship to Assamese; and their expressions and their use of adi-rasa are found in the later Panchali works of Mankar and Pitambar. After this period of shared legacy, a fully differentiated Assamese literature finally emerged in the 14th century.

=== Medieval era ===
==== Pre-Shankari literature (1300-1490 AD) ====
This period saw the flourishing of two kinds of literary activity: translations and adaptations, and choral songs.

===== Translations and adaptations =====
The earliest known Assamese writer of this period was Hema Saraswati, whose well known works include Prahlad Charita (prahlādacarita) and Hara Gauri Samvada (haragaurīsaṃvāda). The story of the Prahlad Charita is taken from the Vamana Purana and the Hara Gouri Samvada includes the myth of Hara-Gouri marriage, birth of Kartik etc. Kaviratna Saravati's Jayadratha-vadha; Rudra Kandali's Satyaki-pravesa are prominent works of this era. Harivara Vipra, a court poet of Kamata Kingdom, composed Babhruvahanar Yuddha (babhruvāhanar yuddha) based on the Mahabharata, Lava-Kushar Yuddha (lavakuśar yuddha) based on the Ramayana, and Tamradwajar Yudha (tāmradhvajar yuddha). Though translated works, they contain local descriptions and embellishments, a feature that describes all translated work of this period. His Babhruvahanar Yuddha, for instance makes references to articles of the Ahom kingdom, which at that time was a small kingdom in the east, and describes the undivided Lakhimpur region, and in Lava-Kushar Yuddha he departs from the original and describes local customs for Rama and Sita's pumsavana ceremony. All these works are associated with Durlabhanarayana of Kamata and his immediate successors.

The major work from this period that left a lasting impression is Saptakanda Ramayana (saptakāṇḍarāmāyana), composed by Madhava Kandali in verse, and recited in the court of a 14th-century Baraha king Mahamanikya (Mahamanikpha) who ruled either in the Nagaon or the Golaghat region. In chronology, among vernacular translations of the original Sanskrit, Kandali's Ramayana comes after Kamban's (Tamil, 12th century), and ahead of Kirttivas' (Bengali, 15th century), Tulsidas' (Awadhi, 16th century), Balaram Das' (Oriya) etc. Thus the Saptakanda Ramayana becomes the first rendition of the Ramayana into an Indo-Aryan language in the Indian subcontinent. The literary language (as opposed to the colloquial Assamese) this work adopted became the standard literary language for much of the following periods, till the rise of new literature in the 19th century. That his work was a major influence can be inferred from Sankardev's tribute to the "opromadi purbo kobi" (apramādī pūrvakavi, unerring predecessor poet).

The pada form of metrical verse (14 syllables in each verse with identical two syllables at the end of each foot in a couplet) became a standard in Assamese kavya works, something that continued till the modern times. Though a translated work, it is infused with local color, and instead of the heroic, Kandali instead emphasized the homely issues of relationships etc. Among the two kinds of alamkara's, arthalankaras were used extensively, with similes and metaphors taken from the local milieu even though the original works are set in foreign lands; whereas the shabdalankara (alliteration etc.) were rarely used.

In the pre-shankari era, a renowned mathematician, Bakul Kayastha from Kamarupa Kingdom, compiled Kitabat Manjari(1434), which was a translation of the Līlāvatī by Bhāskara II into Assamese. Kitabat Manjari is a poetical treatise on Arithmetic, Surveying and Bookkeeping. The book teaches how accounts are to be kept under different heads and how stores belonging to the royal treasury are to be classified and entered into a stock book. The works of Bakul Kayastha were regarded as standards in his time to be followed by other Kayasthas in maintaining royal accounts.

=== Choral songs ===
Choral songs composed for a popular form of narration-performances called Oja-Pali, a precursor to theater and theatrical performances, came to be known as Panchali works. Though some of these works are contemporaneous to Sankardev's, they hark back to older forms free of Sankardev's influences and so are considered pre-Sankardev literature. The Oja-palis follow two different traditions: biyah-gowa which tells stories from the Mahabharata and Maroi, which tells stories on the snake goddess Manasa. The poets—Pitambar, Durgabar, Mankar and Sukavi Narayan—are well known for the compositions.

==== Shankari literature (1490-1700 AD) ====
প্ৰথমে প্ৰণামো ব্ৰহ্মৰূপী সনাতন ।
সৰ্ব্ব অৱতাৰৰ কাৰণ নাৰায়ণ ।।
তযু নাভি কমলত ব্ৰহ্মা ভৈলা জাত ।
যুগে যুগে অৱতাৰ ধৰা অসংখ্যাত ।।১।।

— Sankardev, Kirtana Ghosa

In Assamese literature, the era of Sankardev or Shankari era, incorporates the literary works that were produced mostly as pertinent to the Neo-Vaishnavite movement which propagated the Ekasarana Nama-Dharma. Sankardev's contribution to Assamese literature is multidimensional and spread through different genres of literature. He is credited with building on past cultural relics and devising new forms of music (Borgeet), theatrical performance (Ankia Naat, Bhaona), dance (Sattriya), literary language (Brajavali). Sankardev produced a large body of work. Though there were others before him who wrote in the language of the common man, it was Sankardev who opened the floodgates and inspired others like Madhavdev to carry on where he left off. His magnum opus is the Kirtana-Ghosha which contains narrative verses glorifying Shri Krishna, meant for community singing. His other prominent literary works include the rendering of eight books of the Bhagavata Purana including the Adi Dasama (ādidaśama, Book X), Harishchandra-upakhyana (hariścandra upākhyāna), Bhakti-pradip (bhaktipradīpa), Nimi-navasiddha-samvada (niminavasiddhasaṃvāda), Bhakti-ratnakara (bhaktiratnākara; Sanskrit verses, mostly from the Bhagavata, compiled into a book), Anadi-patana, Gunamala and many plays like Cihna yatra (cihna-yātrā), Rukmini haran (rukmiṇī-haraṇa), Patni prasad (patnī-prasāda), Keli Gopal (keli-gopāla), Kurukshetra yatra (kurukṣetra-yātrā) and Srirama vijaya (śrīrāma-vijaya).

Madhavdeva, a disciple of Sankardev, has a large scale contribution to Assamese literature. His Magnum opus, Naam Ghosa (nāmaghoṣa) is based chiefly on the Bhagavata Purana. The Naam-Ghosa is known by the name of Hajari Ghosa as well, as it contains one thousand verses (ghoṣas).His Guru Bhatima, a long poem of praise to his Guru Sankardev, is also popular. Bhakti-Ratnavali (bhakti-ratnāvalī) is another notable work, rendered by Madhavadeva from the original work by Viṣṇupurī in Sanskrit. Other prominent works include Naam Maalikaa (nāma-mālikā, Assamese rendering of the Ādi Kāṇḍa of Vālmīki's Ramayana), Janma Rahasya, 191 Borgeets and several plays.

After Sankardev and Madhavdev, several other writers emerged and contributed to Assamese literature. Ananta Kandali's Mahiravana Vadha, Harihara Yuddha, Vrttrasura Vadha, Kumara Harana and Sahasra Nama Vrttanta; Rama Saraswati's translation of the Mahabharata, Geeta Govinda and Vadha Kavyas; a part of Naam Ghosa by Ratnakar Kandali; Sridhar Kandali's Kumara Harana; Janmajatra, Nandutsav, Gopi-Uddhab Sambad and Sitar Patal Pravesh by Gopaldev; compilation of Kirtan Ghosha by Ramcharan Thakur; Nava Ghosha, Santasaar, Burha-Bhashya by Purushottam Thakur etc. are notable of the period.

Bhattadeva, another notable writer of this period, is acknowledged as the father of Assamese prose. Katha Bhagavata, Katha Gita, Bhaktiratnavali, Bhakti Viveka (Sanskrit) etc. are his prominent works. BhattadevBhattadeva's erudition in Sanskrit grammar and literature, and his command over the Bhagavata earned him the title of Bhagavata Bhattacharya.

==== Post-Shankari literature (1700-1826 AD) ====
Along with the expansion of power and border of the Ahom kingdom, literary works other than Neo-vaishnavite centric started gaining momentum in the 18th century. However the tradition of composing works based on Sanskrit scriptures still continued. Raghunath Mahanta was one of the most important figures of this period whose well known works include Katha-Ramayana, Adbhut Ramayana and Satrunjoy- all of them are based on the Ramayana. Kabiraj Chakravarti's translation of Brahma Vaivarta Purana and Shakuntala, Gitar Puthi of Kabiraj Chakravati mentions several songs themselves composed by the Ahom Rajas Rudra Singha and Siva Singha. Kavichandra Dwija's Dharma Purana, Bishnu Dev Goswami's Padma Purana, Putala Charitra by Borruchi, Ramchadra Borpatra's Hoigrib-Madhva Kahini, Acharya Dwija's Ananda-Lahari, Ruchinath Kandali's translation of Chandi Aakhyana are important works of this period. Among translation of texts related to practical knowledge include translation of Srihastha Muktavali on Dance and mudra by Suchand Ojha, translations of Kaamratna- Tantra, Bhaswati by Kaviraj Chakraborti. Hastividyarnava, commissioned under the patronage of king Siva Singha and translated by Sukumar Barkaith, is based on the Sanskrit text Gajendra-Chintamoni by Sambhunath. Books like Ghora Nidaan, Aswanidaan by Surjyakhari Daivajna were also compiled during this period.

Attached to the palace of the Ahom Kings there was a set of apartments for the preservation of royal manuscripts, records, letters despatches, and maps in charge of a high official named Gandbia Barua. There was another officer named Likhakar Barua literally the superintendent of scribes who supervised the work of an army of clerks and copyists.

=== Modern era ===
This is a period of the prose chronicles (Buranji) of the Ahom court. The Ahoms had brought with them an instinct for historical writings. In the Ahom court, historical chronicles were at first composed in their original Tai-Kadai language, but when the Ahom rulers adopted Assamese as the court language, historical chronicles began to be written in Assamese. From the beginning of the 17th century onwards, court chronicles were written in large numbers. These chronicles or buranjis, as they were called by the Ahoms, broke away from the style of the religious writers. The language is essentially modern except for slight alterations in grammar and spelling.

==== Effect of British rule ====
The British implemented Bengali in 1836 in Assam after the state was occupied and annexed with the Bengal Presidency. As a result of this, it is argued that the progress of education in Assam remained not only slow but highly defective and a lot of Bengalis were brought in and employed in the different schools of Assam. Writing of text books in Assamese for school children did not get any encouragement and Assamese literature naturally suffered in its growth. Due to a sustained campaign, Assamese was reinstated in 1873 as the state language. Since the initial printing and literary activity occurred in eastern Assam, the Eastern dialect was introduced in schools, courts, and offices and soon came to be formally recognized as the Standard Assamese. In recent times, with the growth of Guwahati as the political and commercial center of Assam, the Standard Assamese has moved away from its roots in the Eastern dialect.

==== Influence of missionaries ====
The modern Assamese period began with the publication of the Bible in Assamese prose by the American Baptist missionaries in 1819. The currently prevalent standard Asamiya has its roots in the Sibsagar dialect of Eastern Assam. As mentioned in Bani Kanta Kakati's "Assamese, its Formation and Development" (1941, Published by Sree Khagendra Narayan Dutta Baruah, LBS Publications, G.N. Bordoloi Road, Gauhati-1, Assam, India) – "The Missionaries made Sibsagar in Eastern Assam the centre of their activities and used the dialect of Sibsagar for their literary purposes". The American Baptist Missionaries were the first to use this dialect in translating the Bible in 1813.

The missionaries established the first printing press in Sibsagar in 1836 and started using the local Asamiya dialect for writing purposes. In 1846 they started a monthly periodical called Arunodoi, and in 1848, Nathan Brown published the first book on Assamese grammar. The Missionaries published the first Assamese-English Dictionary compiled by M. Bronson in 1867. One of the major contributions of the American Baptist missionaries to the Assamese language is the reintroduction of Assamese as the official language in Assam. In 1848 missionary Nathan Brown published a treatise on the Assamese language. This treatise gave a strong impetus towards reintroducing Assamese the official language in Assam. In his 1853 official report on the province of Assam, British official Moffat Mills wrote:

...the people complain, and in my opinion with much reason, of the substitution of Bengalee for the Vernacular Assamese. Bengalee is the language of the court, not of their popular books and shashtras, and there is a strong prejudice to its general use. …Assamese is described by Mr. Brown, the best scholar in the province, as a beautiful, simple language, differing in more respects from, than agreeing with, Bengalee, and I think we made a great mistake in directing that all business should be transacted in Bengalee, and that the Assamese must acquire it. It is too late now to retrace our steps, but I would strongly recommend Anandaram Phukan’s proposition to the favourable consideration of the Council of Education, viz., the substitution of the vernacular language in lieu of Bengalee, and completion of the course of the Vernacular education in Bengalee. I feel persuaded that a youth will, under this system of tuition, learn more in two than he now acquires in four years. An English youth is not taught in Latin until he is well grounded in English, and in the same manner, an Assamese should not be taught in a foreign language until he knows his own.

==== Beginning of modern literature ====
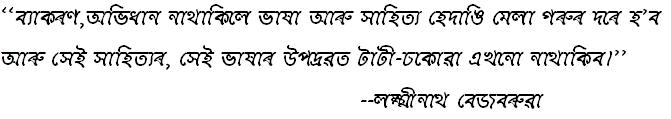

মোৰ ই অন্তৰ খনি সাগৰৰ দৰে নীলা, বেদনাৰে –
দেখা নাই তুমি ?
উঠিছে মৰিছে য’ত বাসনাৰ লক্ষ ঢউ তোমাৰেই
স্মৃতি – সীমা চুমি |

— Dev Kanta Barooah, "Saagor Dekhisa"

The period of modern literature began with the publication the Assamese journal Jonaki (জোনাকী) (1889), which introduced the short story form first by Lakshminath Bezbaroa. Thus began the Jonaki period of Assamese literature. In 1894 Rajanikanta Bordoloi published the first Assamese novel Mirijiyori.

The modern Assamese literature has been enriched by the works of Jyoti Prasad Agarwalla, Birinchi Kumar Barua, Hem Barua, Atul Chandra Hazarika, Mafizuddin Ahmed Hazarika, Nalini Bala Devi, Navakanta Barua, Syed Abdul Malik, Mamoni Raisom Goswami, Bhabendra Nath Saikia, Homen Borgohain, Birendra Kumar Bhattacharya, D. K. Barooah, Nirupama Borgohain, Kanchan Baruah, Saurabh Kumar Chaliha and others. Moreover, as regards the spreading of Assamese literature outside Assam, the complete work of Jyoti Prasad Agarwala has been translated into Hindi to reach a wider audience by Devi Prasad Bagrodia. Bagrodia has also translated Sankardev's 'Gunamala' into Hindi.

In 1917 the Asam Sahitya Sabha was formed as a guardian of the Assamese society and the forum for the development of Assamese language and literature. Padmanath Gohain Baruah was the first president of the society.

==== Contemporary literature ====
Contemporary writers include Arupa Patangia Kalita, Parismita Singh, Monikuntala Bhattacharya, Mousumi Kondoli, Monalisa Saikia, Geetali Borah, Juri Borah Borgohain. Emerging trends are marked by experiments with post modernist literary technique and growing fascination of young writers with magic realism and surrealism. In the realm of literary criticism young literary critics Areendom Borkataki, Bhaskar Jyoti Nath, Debabhusan Borah are exploring different possibilities and ideas to meet the needs in literary criticism. Assamese literature is currently booming in Assamese-speaking world, with readership of Assamese books gradually increasing over the last decades. A huge success can be seen in North East book fair and Nagaon book fair, when selling of Assamese books increased then English books.

== See also ==
- List of Assamese writers with their pen names
- Asamiya Bhasa Unnati Sadhini Sabha
- Assamese Short Story
- Assamese Poetry
- List of Assamese poets
- Indian literature
- List of Sahitya Akademi Award winners for Assamese
- Assam Sahitya Sabha
- Sadou Asom Lekhika Samaroh Samiti
