= List of Sahitya Akademi Award winners for Assamese =

List of winners of a literary honor in India

Sahitya Akademi Award for Assamese
- Award for contributions to Assamese literature
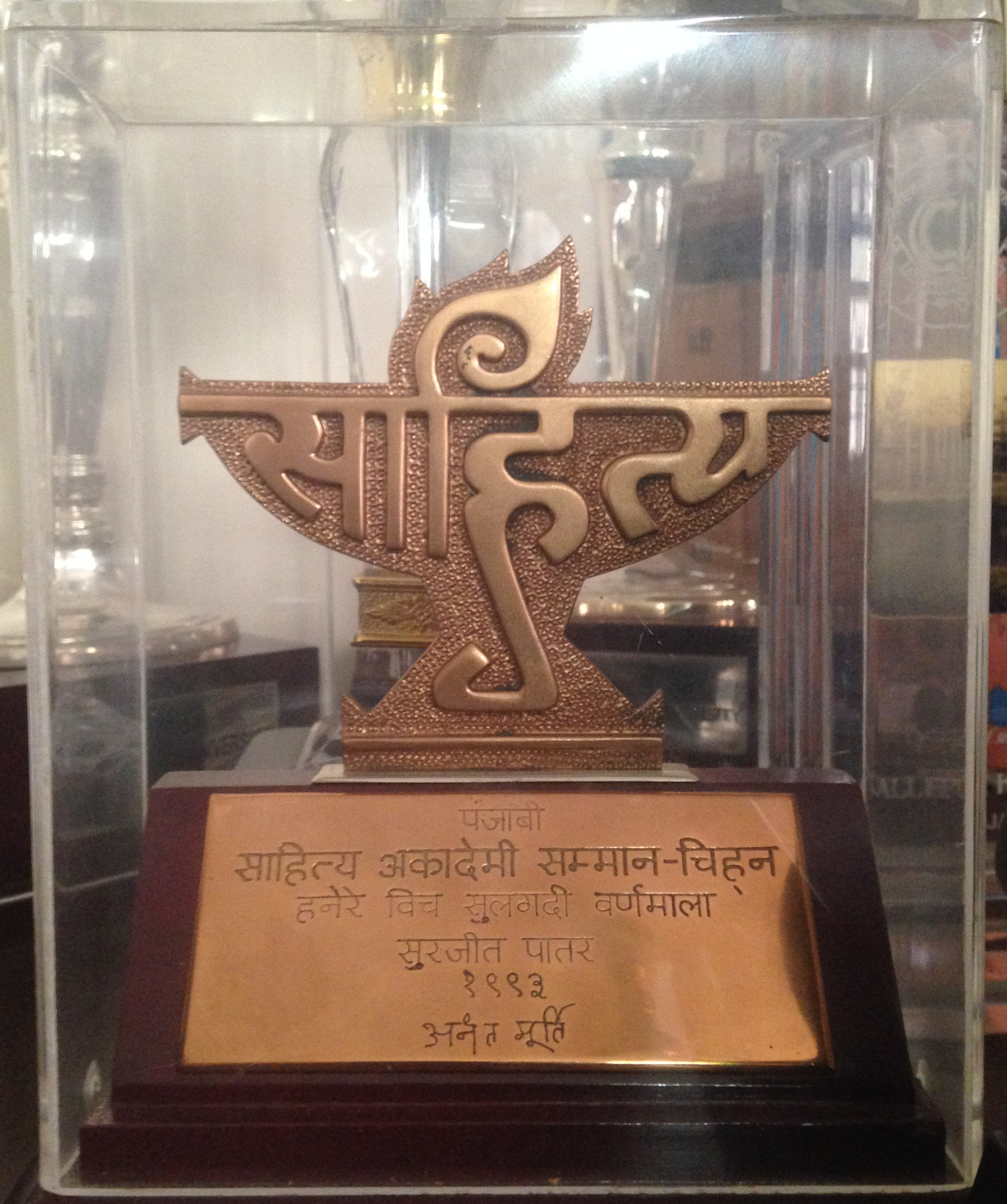
- Awarded for: Literary award in India
- Sponsored by: Sahitya Akademi, Government of India
- Reward: ₹1 lakh (US$1,100)
- First award: 1955
- Final award: 2024

Highlights
- Total awarded: 61
- First winner: Jatindranath Dowara
- Most Recent winner: Sameer Tanti
- Website: website

Part of a series on

Sahitya Akademi Awards
Category
Sahitya Akademi Award winners by language
- Assamese
- Bengali
- Bodo
- Dogri
- English
- Gujarati
- Hindi
- Kannada
- Kashmiri
- Konkani
- Maithili
- Malayalam
- Marathi
- Meitei (Manipuri)
- Nepali
- Odia
- Punjabi
- Rajasthani
- Sanskrit
- Santali
- Sindhi
- Tamil
- Telugu
- Urdu
Sahitya Akademi Translation Prizes
- Assamese
- Bengali
- Bodo
- Dogri
- English
- Gujarati
- Hindi
- Kannada
- Kashmiri
- Konkani
- Maithili
- Malayalam
- Marathi
- Meitei (Manipuri)
- Nepali
- Odia
- Punjabi
- Rajasthani
- Sanskrit
- Santali
- Sindhi
- Tamil
- Telugu
- Urdu
Sahitya Akademi Yuva Puraskar
- Assamese
- Bengali
- Bodo
- Dogri
- English
- Gujarati
- Hindi
- Kannada
- Kashmiri
- Konkani
- Maithili
- Malayalam
- Meitei (Manipuri)
- Marathi
- Nepali
- Odia
- Punjabi
- Rajasthani
- Sanskrit
- Santali
- Sindhi
- Tamil
- Telugu
- Urdu
Sahitya Akademi Bal Sahitya Puraskar
- Assamese
- Bengali
- Bodo
- Dogri
- English
- Gujarati
- Hindi
- Kannada
- Kashmiri
- Konkani
- Maithili
- Malayalam
- Meitei (Manipuri)
- Marathi
- Nepali
- Odia
- Punjabi
- Rajasthani
- Sanskrit
- Santali
- Sindhi
- Tamil
- Telugu
- Urdu
Related
- Eighth Schedule to the Constitution of India
- Official Languages Commission
- List of languages by number of native speakers in India

Sahitya Akademi Award is given each year, since 1955, by Sahitya Akademi (India's National Academy of Letters), to writers and their works, for their outstanding contribution to the upliftment of Indian literature and Assamese literature in particular. Sahitya Akademi Fellowship is the highest honour conferred by the academy on a writer. Three people from Assam have been honoured with the fellowship, namely Nagen Saikia (2019), Nilmani Phookan (2002) and Syed Abdul Malik (1999).

No awards were conferred in 1956, 1957, 1958, 1959, 1962, 1963, 1965, 1971, 1973 and 2013.

== Recipients ==
Year	Book	Portrait	Author	Category of Books
1955	Ban Phul	—	Jatindranath Dowara	Poetry
1960	Kangrechar Kachiyali Rodot		Benudhar Sharma	Reminiscences
1961	Iyaruingam	—	Birendra Kumar Bhattacharya	Novel
1964	Asamar Loka Sanskriti	—	Birinchi Kumar Barua	Study in folk culture
1966	Bedanar Ulka	—	Ambikagiri Raichoudhury	Poetry
1967	Adhunik Galpa Sahitya		Trailokyanath Goswami	Literary criticism
1968	Alakananda		Nalinibala Devi	Poetry
1969	Manchalekha	—	Atul Chandra Hazarika	Study of Assamese theatre
1970	Mahatmar Pora Rupknowarloi	—	Lakshminath Phukan	Reminiscences
1972	Aghari Atmar Kahini	—	Syed Abdul Malik	Novel
1974	Golam	—	Saurabh Kumar Chaliha	Short stories
1975	Koka Deutar har	—	Nabakanta Barua	Novel
1976	Srinkhal	—	Bhabendra Nath Saikia	Short stories
1977	Bakul Banar Kavita		Anand Chandra Barua	Poetry
1978	Pita Putra		Homen Borgohain	Novel
1979	Sonali Jahaj	—	Bhaben Barua	Poetry
1980	Prithibir Axukh	—	Jogesh Das	Short stories
1981	Kabita	—	Nilmani Phookan Jr	Poetry
1982	Mamare Dhara Tarowal Aru Dukhan Upanyasa		Mamoni Raisom Goswami (Indira Goswami)	Novel
1983	Sudirgha Din Aru Ritu	—	Nirmalprabha Bordoloi	Poetry
1984	Jangam	—	Debendra Nath Acharya	Novel
1985	Krishna Kanta Handique Rachna-Sambhar		Krishna Kanta Handique	Literary criticism
1986	Benudhar Sarma	—	Tirthanath Sarma	Biography
1987	Aan Ejon	—	Harekrishna Deka	Poetry
1988	Patal Bhairavi		Lakshmi Nandan Bora	Novel
1989	Asamiya Jatiya Jivanat Mahapurushiya Parampara	—	Hiren Gohain	Literary criticism
1990	Snehadevir Ekuki Galpa	—	Sneha Devi	Short stories
1991	Brahmaputra Ityadi Padya	—	Ajit Barua	Poetry
1992	Shaichar Pathar Manuh		Hiren Bhattacharyya	Poetry
1993	Mor Je Kiman Hepah	—	Keshav Mahanta	Poetry
1994	Madhupur Bahudur	—	Rebati Mohan Dutta Choudhury (Sheelabhadra)	Short stories
1995	Maharathi	—	Chandra Prasad Saikia	Novel
1996	Abhijatri	—	Nirupama Borgohain	Novel
1997	Andharat Nijar Mukh		Nagen Saikia	Short stories
1998	Asirbadar Rang		Arun Sarma	Novel
1999	Biponna Samay	—	Medini Choudhury	Novel
2000	Baghe Tapur Rati		Apurba Sarma	Short stories
2001	Edhani Mahir Hahi	—	Mahim Bora	Novel
2002	Mahat Aitijhya		Nalinidhar Bhattacharyya	Prose
2003	Anek Manuh Anek Thai Aru Nirjanata	—	Bireswar Barua	Poetry
2004	Manuh Anukule	—	Hirendra Nath Dutta	Poetry
2005	Mouna Oth Mukhar Hridoy		Yeshe Dorjee Thongchi	Novel
2006	Cheneh Jorir Ganthi	—	Atulananda Goswami	Short stories
2007	Santanukulanandan	—	Purabi Bormudoi	Novel
2008	Deo Langkhui	—	Rita Chowdhury	Novel
2009	Katha Ratnakar	—	Dhrubajyoti Bora	Novel
2010	Assamiya Ramayani Sahitya:kathabastur atiguri	—	Keshada Mahanta	Article
2011	Aei Anuragi aei udas	—	Kabin Phukan	Poetry
2012	Patkair Epare Mor Desh	—	Chandana Goswami	Novel
2013	Dhuliyori Bharir Sans	—	Rabindra Sarkar	Poetry
2014	Mariam Astin Athaba Hira Barua		Arupa Kalita Patangia	Short Stories
2015	Akashar Chhabi Aru Anyanya Galpa	—	Kula Saikia	Short Stories
2016	Maghmalar Bhraman		Jnan Pujari	Poetry collection
2017	Moriahola		Jayanta Madhab Bora	Novel
2018	Kaliloir Dintu Amar Hobo		Sananta Tanty	Poetry collection
2019	Chanakya		Joyasree Goswami Mahanta	Novel
2020	Bengsata	—	Apurba Kumar Saikia	Short stories
2021	Yat Ekhon Aranya Asil	—	Anuradha Sharma Pujari	Novel
2022	Bhool Satya	—	Manoj Kumar Goswami	Short stories
2023	Dr. Pranavjyoti Dekar Srestha Galpa	—	Pranavjyoti Deka	Short stories
2024	Pharingbore Bator Katha Jane	—	Sameer Tanti	Poetry
2025	Karhi Khelar Sadhu	—	Devabrat Das	Novel
