= Dear Mom =

Dear Mom may refer to:

- Dear Mom (Glenn Miller song)
- Dear Mom (Girls' Generation song)
- Dear Mom (Brooke Hogan song)

== See also ==
- Dear Dad (disambiguation)
