= Rajaniprabha Saikia =

First Assamese woman doctor

Rajani Prabha Saikia
- Born: Rameswari; Daisingari village, Bajali, Barpeta district
- Died: Daisingari village, Bajali, Barpeta district
- Citizenship: Indian
- Education: Bachelor of Medicine
- Alma mater: Calcutta Medical College
- Occupation: Physician
- Parent(s): Ratiram Majumder (father); Gangapriya (mother)
- Relatives: Chandraprabha Saikiani (sister)
- Writing career
- Language: English

Rajani Prabha Saikia (also known as Rajani Prabha Das) was the first Assamese woman to graduate with a Bachelor of Medicine degree. She was among the first two Assamese women to earn an MBBS degree from Calcutta Medical College, the oldest medical college in Asia. The other recipient was Tilottama Roy Chowdhury.

== Early life and personal background ==
Rajni Prabha Saikia was born in Daishingari village in the Bajali area of present-day Barpeta district, Assam. She was originally named Rameshwari at birth. She was a member of Saikia family and her sister Chandraprabha Saikiani was a noted social reformer and Padma Shri awardee.

== Career ==
Rajni Prabha Saikia initially held government positions in places such as Shillong and Chabua. She later moved to Bengal, where she worked at a hospital associated with a cotton mill in Angos near Serampore, West Bengal.

== Death ==
Shortly after her marriage, Rajni Prabha Das experienced mental health issues and became mentally disturbed. She later died due to complications arising from her mental illness in her native village of Daishingari.
