= Bhabendra Nath Saikia =

Indian film director

- Born: 20 February 1932; Nowgong, Assam Province, British India
- Died: 13 August 2003 (aged 71); Guwahati, Assam, India
- Education: PhD in Physics, University of London.; Honorary PhD in Literature, Dibrugarh University, Assam, India
- Alma mater: Cotton College (BS); Presidency College (MS); University of London (PhD); Imperial College London (Diploma)
- Occupations: Teacher, filmmaker, writer
- Spouse: Preeti Saikia
- Awards: See below

Bhabendra Nath Saikia (20 February 1932 – 13 August 2003) was a novelist, short-story writer, editor and film director from Assam, India. Saikia received his doctorate in physics from the University of London. He began his career as a reader in the Department of Physics, University of Guwahati. He later played an important role in the publication of college level textbooks in the Assamese language during his tenure as the Secretary of the Co-ordination Committee for production of textbooks in regional languages.

Saikia was the founding editor of the Assamese language weekly Prantik and the children's magazine Safura. He has written plays for radio and theatre. He was the director and screenplay writer for eight Assamese language films, receiving the Rajat Kamal Award from the Government of India for seven.

He won the Sahitya Academy (1976), and was also recognised with the Padma Shri in 2001. He was awarded the 'Assam Valley Literature Award' in 1990.

== Biography ==
Bhabendra Nath Saikia was born on 20 February 1932 at Nagaon town. He passed his matriculation examination in 1948 from Nagaon Government Boy's Higher Secondary School (where he was founder editor of school magazine 'UDAY') and the intermediate examination in Science in 1950, both with first division marks. He passed BSc Examination in 1952 with honours in Physics from the Cotton College of Gauhati University. He received a post graduate degree in physics from the Presidency College of Calcutta University. He obtained his PhD in physics from the University of London in 1961. He also obtained a diploma from the Imperial College of Science & Technology, London, in 1961. He later worked as reader in Physics at the Gauhati University. He became a member of Sangeet Natak Akademi, India.

Saikia edited the Prantik (প্ৰান্তিক), an Assamese monthly magazine, and a children's magazine named Xaphura (সঁফুৰা), both in the Assamese language. He was also the president of the Jyoti Chitraban which was for a long time the only film studio in Assam. He had the unique distinction of having won the National Awards for each of his seven Assamese films. For his services to the literature, culture and cinema of Assam, Saikia was awarded the Padma Shri in 2001.

Having spent his childhood in poverty, Saikia established the Aarohan Trust in Guwahati using the money he received from the Assam Valley Literary Award to provide free training to poor children interested in art, theatre, and music. Saikia died on 13 August 2003 in Guwahati, survived by his wife Preeti Saikia and two daughters. The Assam Government has named a road in Guwahati and a state award in his honour.

== Works ==
Many of Saikia's stories have been translated into English, Bengali, Hindi, Telugu, Malayalam, Marathi, Gujarati etc. He had also written a large number of plays for All India Radio (AIR). The plays Kolahal, Durbhiksha, and Itihas were taken up by the AIR as national plays. He has written many plays for the Mobile Theatre of Assam, and a number of one-act plays.

Saikia directed eight feature films, which have been screened at International Film Festivals held at various places such as Cannes, Madras, Hyderabad, New Delhi, Bangalore, Calcutta, Karlovy Vary (Czechoslovakia), Nantes (France), Valladolid (Spain), Algiers (Algeria), Pyong Yong (North Korea), Sydney, Munich, Montreal and Toronto. He has also directed one episode of a Doordarshan series on Rabindranath Tagore's stories in Hindi. Seven out of Saikia's eight films have been selected for Indian Panorama Section of the International Film Festival of India. He received the Sahitya Akademi (India) Award in 1976, the Rajat Kamal Award of the Government of India for the film Sandhyarag in 1978, Anirban in 1981, Agnisnan in 1985, Kolahal in 1988, Sarothi in 1992, Abartan in 1994 and for Itihas in 1996. He was adjudged as one of the "Twenty one Great Assamese Persons of the twentieth century" in a literary weekly news magazine of Assam.

Sringkhal (The Quiver), an Assamese film based on a short story written by Bhabendra Nath Saikia, was released on 17 October 2014. Directed by Prabin Hazarika, Sringkhal was co-produced by the Assam State Film (Finance and Development) Corporation Limited with Preeti Saikia, Partha Pratim Bora, Sangeeta Saikia, Dipendra Patowary and Prabin Hazarika.

He was actively involved with the Assamese Mobile Theater industry, most notably with Abahan Theater.

=== Feature films ===
==== Assamese ====
- Sandhya Raag (Rajat Kamal award, 1977; screened at the Cannes Film Festival in 1978)
- Anirban [অনির্বান] (Rajat Kamal award, 1981)
- Agnisnaan [অগ্নিস্নান] (Rajat Kamal award, 1985)
- Kolahal [কোলাহল](Rajat Kamal award, 1988)
- Sarothi [সাৰথি](Rajat Kamal award, 1992)
- Abartan [আৱর্তন](Rajat Kamal award, 1994)
- Itihas [ইতিহাস](Rajat Kamal award, 1996)

==== Hindi ====
- Kaal Sandhya [কালসন্ধ্যা](1997) deals with the insurgency in the North East and was screened at the International Film Festival of India and the Cairo International Film Festival.

=== Novels ===
- Antarip [অন্তৰীপ][ the cape]
- Ramyabhumi [ৰম্যভূমি] [ the accoland]
- Atankar Shekhot [আতংকৰ শেষত] [ at the end of the panic]

=== Short story collections ===
- Prahari (প্ৰহৰী) [ the watchman]
- Sendur (সেন্দুৰ) [Sindur]
- Gahabar (গহ্বৰ) [the cave]
- Srinkhal (শৃংখল) [the chain]
- Upakantha (উপকন্থ)[ nearby place]
- Ai bandaror abeli (এই বন্দৰৰ আবেলি) [Afternoon of this port ]
- Brindabon (বৃন্দাবন) [brindabon-name of a person ]
- Taranga (তৰংগ) [ wave ]
- Sandhya Bhraman (সান্ধ্য ভ্ৰমণ) [evening walk ]
- Galpa aru Shilpa (গল্প আৰু শিল্প) [ Story and art]. Edited by Shri Hridayananda Gogoi
- Akash (আকাশ) [the sky]

=== Plays ===
- Romyabhumi (ৰম্যভূমি)
- Neelakontho (নীলকণ্ঠ)
- Mahaaranya (মহাৰণ্য)
- Deenabandhu (দীনবন্ধু)
- Paandulipi (পান্দুলিপি)
- Aamrapaali (অম্ৰপালি)
- Aranyat Godhuli (অৰণ্যত গধুলি)
- Monikut (মণিকুট)
- Gahbor (গহ্বৰ)
- Gadhuli (গধুলি)
- Amrit (অমৃত)
- Barnamaalaa (বর্ণমালা)
- Bandeexaal (বন্দীশাল)
- Paramaananda (পৰমানন্দ)
- Xubho-xongbaad (শুভ সংবাদ)
- Bixkumbha (বিষকুম্ভ)
- Andhakup (অন্ধকুপ)
- Digambar (দিগম্বৰ)
- Swarnajayanti (স্বর্ণজয়ন্তী)
- Swargar Duwar (স্বর্গৰ দুৱাৰ)
- Raamdhenu (ৰামধেনু)
- Xataabdee (শতাব্দী)
- Xamudra Manthan (সমুদ্ৰ মন্থন)
- Junak Rati (জোনাক ৰাতি) [unfinished]
- Brindabon (বৃন্দাবন)
- Janmabhumi (জন্মভূমি)
- Pratibimba (প্ৰতিবিম্ব)
- Ejaak jonakir jilmil (এজাক জোনাকীৰ জিলমিল) [one-act play]

=== Children's books ===
- Maramar Deuta (মৰমৰ দেউতা) [Dear Father]
- Tumalukor bhal houk (তোমালোকৰ ভাল হওক)[May you all prosper]
- Xantaxista Hristopusto Mahadusta (শান্ত-শিষ্ট হৃষ্ট-পুষ্ট মহাদুষ্ট)[The quiet one, the physically fit one, and the immensely notorious one. All India Radio children's play on two brothers, a friend, and a sister]
- Mahadustor Dustobuddhi (মহাদুষ্টৰ দুষ্টবুদ্ধি) (Mischief)
- Maram (মৰম) [Love]

=== Collection of essays ===
- Xekh Pristha (শেষ পৃষ্ঠা) [vol-1]
- Xekh Pristha (শেষ পৃষ্ঠা) [vol-2]
- Xekh Pristha (শেষ পৃষ্ঠা) [vol-3]
- Xekh Pristha (শেষ পৃষ্ঠা) [vol-4]

=== Autobiographies ===
- Jeebon Britta (জীৱন বৃত্ত)
- Jeebon Rekha (জীৱন ৰেখা)
- Mur hoishab, mur koishur (মোৰ শৈশৱ, মোৰ কৈশোৰ) [My childhood, my teenage]

=== Humor books ===
- Kalpalukor Kahini (কল্পলোকৰ কাহিনী)
- Xampadokor Kuthalit (সম্পাদকৰ কোঠালিত

=== Magazines ===
- Prantik (প্ৰান্তিক) – He was the founder editor of this Assamese magazine published fortnightly from Guwahati since 1981. It plays a vital role in the socio-political lives of the people of Assam.
- Sofura (সঁফুৰা) – He was the founder editor of this popular Assamese children's magazine.

== Awards and legacy ==
- Assam Publication Board award (1973)
- Sahitya Akademi (1976)
- Assam valley Literary award( 1990)
- Srimanta Sankardeva Award (1998)
- Padma Shri (2001)
- Degree of D.Litt, honoris causa (2001)
- Saikia was honoured posthumously with the naming of the Dr. Bhabendra Nath Saikia Road, in Guwahati, India
- Saikia was honoured posthumously with the naming the Dr. Bhabendra Nath Saikia children's amusement park at the Sri. Sankardev Kalakshetra in Guwahati, India
- Saikia was honoured posthumously with the naming the Dr. Bhabendra Nath Saikia Library at the Sri. Sankardev Kalakshetra in Guwahati, India
- Saikia was honoured posthumously with the naming the Dr. Bhabendra Nath Saikia Cultural Award. The first recipient (2010) was film maker Jahnu Barua from the Chief Minister of Assam, Tarun Gogoi.

== Leadership ==
Saikia was a Member of Sangeet Natak Akademi; Member of the Executive and General Council of Sahitya Akademi; Member, Indian National Council for co-operation with UNESCO; Member, Academic Council, Gauhati University; President of Jyoti Chitraban (Film Studio) Society; Member, Advisory Body, All India Radio, Guwahati; chairman, Assam State Film (Finance and Development) Corporation Ltd; Member., Governing Body, North East Zone Cultural Centre, Dimapur; Member, Governing Body, East Zone Cultural Centre, Kolkata; Member of Court of the Gauhati University, Assam; Member, Society of the Film and Television Institute of India, Pune, Member, Board of Trustees, National Book Trust of India.

He also worked in the creation, proposal, construction, and planning of the Srimanta Sankardev Kalakshetra in Guwahati, Assam, a cultural center and a tourist attraction for the state of Assam. He served as the first vice-president of the Kalakshetra, under the governor of Assam as the President. This center was built in the memory of Assamese cultural legend Srimanta Sankardev (1449–1568).
