= Dear Father =

Dear Father may refer to:

- Dear Father (1979 film), a 1979 Italian film
- Dear Father (2022 film), a 2022 Indian Gujarati-language film
- Dear Father (book), a children's novel by Indian writer Bhabendra Nath Saikia
- "Dear Father" (song), a single by Defeater
- "Dear Father", a song by Yes from Time and a Word
- "Dear Father", a song by Sum 41 from Underclass Hero
- "Dear Father", a song by Black Sabbath from 13
- "Dear Father", a song by Quinn Barnitt and an ending theme song of Sonic Frontiers

== See also ==
- Dear Dad (disambiguation)
