= Sari Gelin =

Folk song of the Transcaucasus region

Sari Gelin (Azerbaijani: Sarı Gəlin, سارؽ گلین; Persian: دامن کشان, romanized: Dâman Kešân) or Sari Aghjik (Armenian: Սարի աղջիկ, romanized: Sāri Āɣčīk) is the name for a number of folk songs popular among the people of Iran, the southern Caucasus (most prominently present-day Azerbaijan and Armenia) and in eastern Anatolia in present-day Turkey. All versions of the song use the same melody and are written in the Bayati makam or mode, but are sung with different lyrics. The consensus about its country of origin is contested.

In the song, a boy complains to or about an unattainable girl he loves. Sari Gelin is either a blonde bride or a girl from the mountains, depending on the language of the lyrics.

== Etymology ==
In Armenian, the song is known as Sari Aghjik, where sari (սարի) means "of the mountain", and "aghjik" means "girl". Together they mean "girl/bride from the mountains".

In Azerbaijani and Turkish the song is known as Sari Gelin, sarı as a Turkic adjective means "yellow". The word gelin or gəlin means someone who comes to the family (i.e. a bride). Thus Sarı Gelin can mean "golden/blond/fair-skinned bride."

== Versions ==
=== Armenian Sari Aghjik ===
The Sari Aghjik (Mountain Girl) version uses the same melody with the Armenian word for the girl (aghjik աղջիկ) as in the song Vard Siretsi ("I loved a rose"). Both Armenian versions, are about the boy complaining that the unkind girl has rejected him. In Armenian Sari Aghjik, the girl has chosen someone else over him. The lyrics translate to:

Վարդ սիրեցի՝ փուշ դառավ, Դլե յաման, (×3), Գնաց, ուրիշին առավ ... Ա՜խ, մերըդ մեռնի, սարի աղջիկ, օ՜յ, օ՜յ, Քարի աղջիկ, օյ, օյ, Քար սիրտ աղջիկ, օյ, օյ, Չար սիրտ աղջիկ: Գնաց, ուրիշին առավ, Դլե յաման, լեյլի յար ջան.	I loved a rose, it turned to thorns, My heart yaman! (×3) She left and chose someone else, Akh! let your mother die! You mountain girl, oy oy you stone girl, oy oy, you stone-hearted girl, oy oy, you wicked-hearted girl. She left and chose someone else My heart yaman! Leyli dear beloved (Persian-Armenian)
Մինուճարիս մեղքացիր, Դլե յաման, (×3) Թույն մի ածա թեժ վերքիս ... Ա՜խ մերըդ մեռնի, սարի աղջիկ, օ՜յ, օ՜յ ... Քարի աղջիկ, օյ, օյ, Քար սիրտ աղջիկ, օյ, օյ, Չար սիրտ աղջիկ: Թույն մի ածա թեժ վերքիս ... Դլե յաման, լեյլի յար ջան.	Take pity on my only child My heart yaman! (×3) Don't pour poison into (salt on) my wound. Akh! let your mother die! You mountain girl, oy oy you stone girl, oy oy, you stone-hearted girl, oy oy, you wicked-hearted girl. Don't pour poison into my wound My heart yaman! Leyli dear beloved.
Եղնիկ եմ՝ նետը կրծքիս, Դըլե յաման, (×3) Տիրել ես խելք ու մտքիս ... Ա՜խ մերըդ մեռնի, սարի աղջիկ, օ՜յ, օ՜յ ... Քարի աղջիկ, օյ, օյ, Քար սիրտ աղջիկ, օյ, օյ, Չար սիրտ աղջիկ: Տիրել ես խելք ու մտքիս ... Դլե յաման, լեյլի յար ջան.	I am a deer with an arrow in my chest My heart yaman! (×3) You have possessed my thoughts and my mind. Akh, may your mother die! You mountain girl, oy oy you stone girl, oy oy, you stone-hearted girl, oy oy, you wicked-hearted girl. You have possessed my thoughts and my mind. My heart yaman! Leyli dear beloved

The phrase "Don't pour poison into (salt on) my wound" is an idiom that means "don't make my troubles worse".

=== Azerbaijani Sarı Gəlin ===
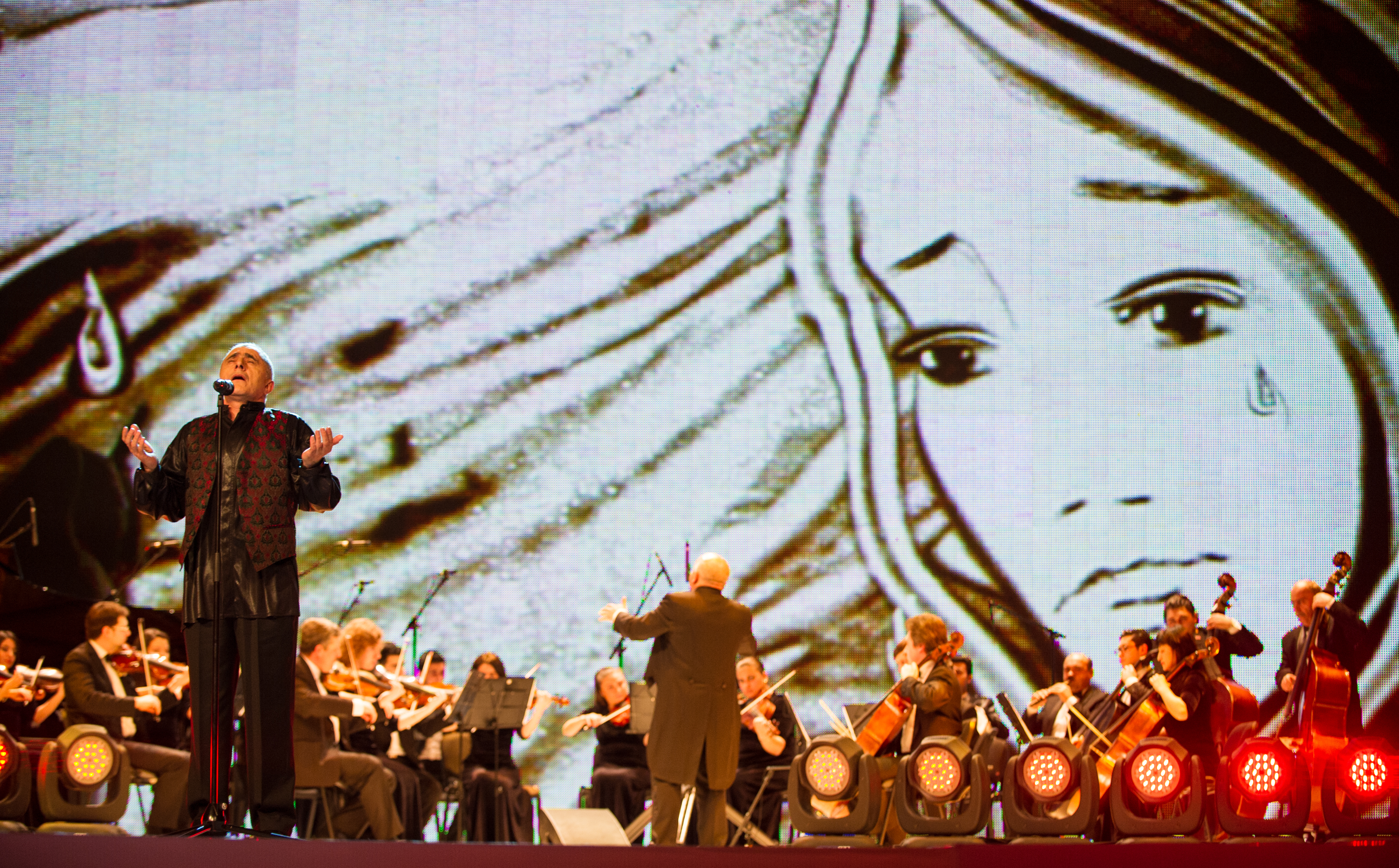
Alim Gasimov performs the Azerbaijani version of "Sari Gelin" at Eurovision 2012 Baku.

In Azerbaijan, Sarı Gəlin (Blond Maiden) is a legend that symbolizes the love between a Muslim Azerbaijani and a Christian Armenian girl who are kept apart.

This versions of Sari Gelin-Sari Aghjik use the same melody and are written in the literary genre known as Bayati, which is one of the most popular forms of poetry in most of the Middle East. Bayati poetry is known for its reflective and introspective prose. Generally, Bayati poetry consists of lines of seven syllables written in a simple rhythm.

Saçın ucun hörməzlər, gülü sulu dərməzlər, Sarı Gəlin.	You don't braid the end of your hair, you don't pick a dewy flower. yellow (blond, fair) bride
bu sevda nə sevdadır, səni mənə verməzlər; neynim aman, aman, (×2); Sarı Gəlin.	What a love is this love! they will not give you to me. what can I do? aman! (secure me! / help! / please!) aman! (×2) yellow bride
bu dərənin uzunu, çoban qaytar quzunu, Sarı Gəlin.	The tallest of this valley, shepherd, return the lamb, yellow bride.
nə ola bir gün görəm, nazlı yarın üzünü; neynim aman, aman, (×2); Sarı Gəlin.	I wish that one day I could see the face of my playful love what can I do? aman! aman! (×2) yellow bride.
Gün ola mən bir görəydim Nazlı yarımın üzünü Neynim aman, aman (×2); Sarı gəlin	Could there be a day I would see (correct translation?) the face of my playful love what can I do? aman! aman! (×2) yellow bride.

The Azerbaijani version of the song was processed and pitched by Azerbaijani composer Asaf Zeynally (1909–1932).

The text of the song in the Azerbaijani language was published in 1982 in Baku under the edition of Hamid Arasly. In 2001 the Azerbaijani text of the song was published by Rafik Babayev.

=== Azerbaijani long version ===
DayIrMan sings a longer Azerbaijani version, which translates to:

Don't braid the end of your hair,

Don't pluck the flower while it's young, yellow bride. Don't braid the end of your hair, Don't pluck the flower while it's young, yellow bride.

You were born for love with me; / We were born to love each other; You are the only one; on earth, in life, in the sky. You are my sunshine, my fire. I fell in love with you on a moonlit night The sun, a man and yellow bride; The only star, land and your breath, I love life, life is you. My eyes that see you are full of eagerness, You came into my dream like a ray, yellow bride.

What kind of love is this? They won't let me marry you. What should I do, what should I do, yellow bride? What kind of love is this? They won't give you to me.

It's me, looking for you among the stars. Answer me, don't break my heart! I will breathe with your warm breath, I will remember you all my life, Enough! dry your tears, don't cry! Don't keep the fire in your heart too long, Your destined happiness is written on your forehead. Pure love within one night. But this is only a dream and you are in my dream, You are my yellow bride among my wishes.

What kind of love is this? They won't let us marry. What should I do, what should I do, yellow bride? What kind of love is this? They won't give you to me.

It's us, only us and the sky, You came to me in this utter night. The light woke me up, And we got separated among the stars. Oh, God, hear my crying, I felt this sharp pain in my heart, Love is a game and I was winning, I couldn't imagine such an end. But you wanted death, You achieved your goal in the end, yellow bride.

What kind of love is this? They won't let me marry you. What should I do, what should I do, yellow bride? You are my yellow bride, You are my yellow bride.

Along this valley, Give the lamb back to me, shepherd ... You are my yellow bride ...

=== Turkish Sarı Gelin ===
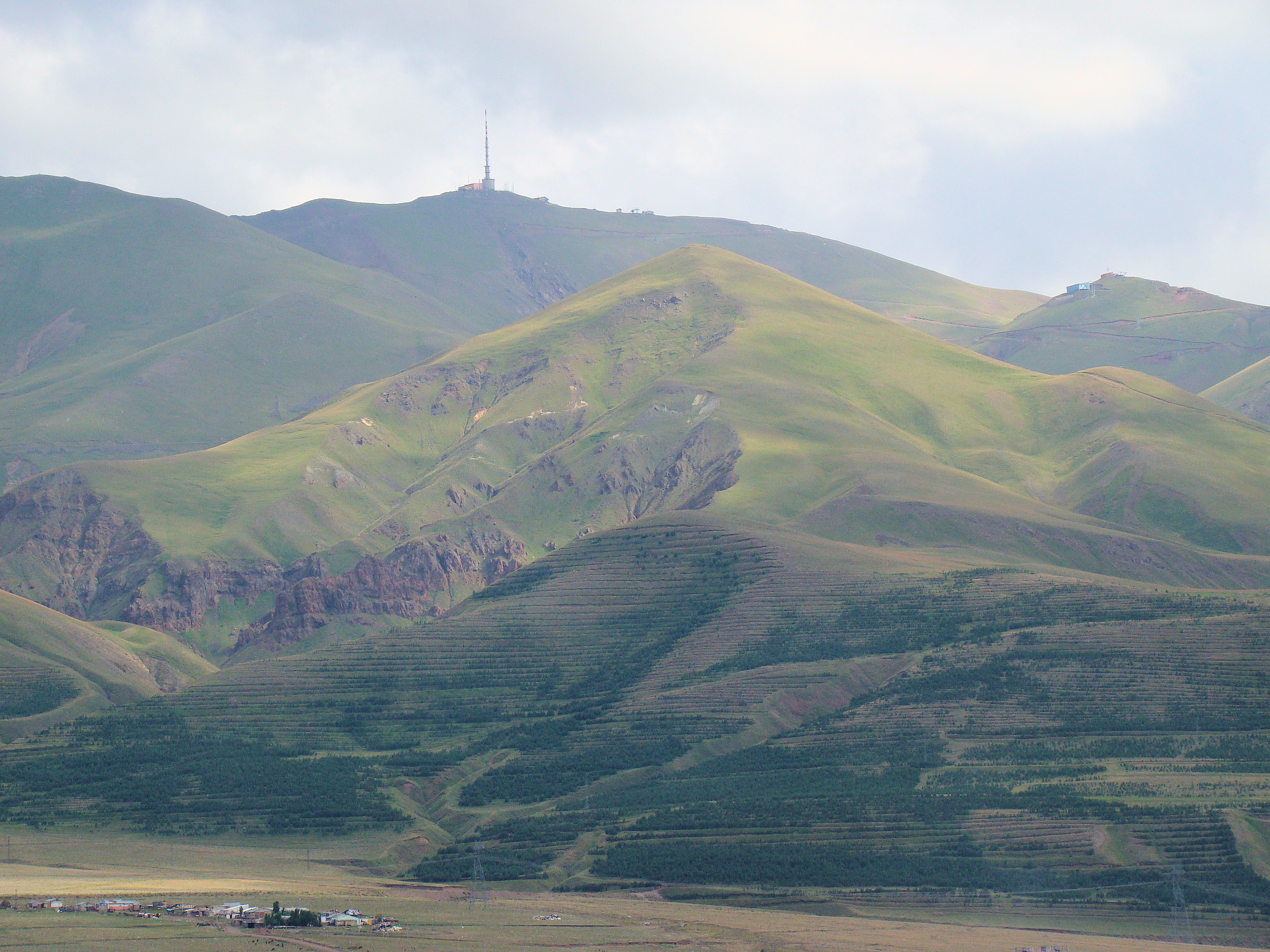
Palandöken Mountain in Erzurum Province

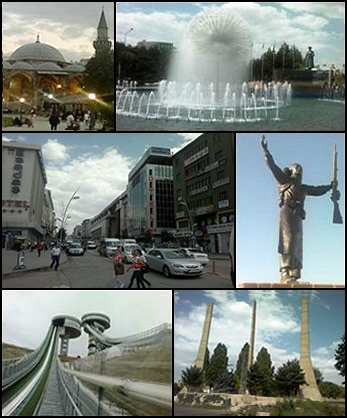
City of Erzurum

Erzurum çarşı Pazar, leylim aman! aman! (×2) sarı gelin. İçinde bir kız gezer, ay! nenen ölsün, sarı gelin aman! (×3) suna yarim.	In the bazaar of Erzurum, my Leyli, aman! (secure me! / help! / please!) aman! (×2) yellow (or blond) bride. A girl is walking around, oh, may your grandma die! my yellow bride, aman! (×3) my tall beautiful dear.
Elinde divit kalem, leylim aman! aman! (×2) sarı gelin. Dertlere derman yazar, / Katlime ferman yazar, ay! nenen ölsün, Sarı gelin aman! (×3) suna yarim.	With the paper/ink and pen in her hand my Leyli, aman! aman! (×2) yellow bride. She writes the prescription for my pains, / She writes the sentence to my assassination, oh, may your grandma die! my yellow bride aman, (×3) my tall beautiful dear.
Erzurum'da bir kuş var leylim aman! aman! (×2) sarı gelin. Kanadında gümüş var, ay! nenen ölsün, sarı gelin aman! (×3) suna yarim.	There's a bird (girl) in Erzurum my Leyli, aman! aman! (×2) yellow bride. It (She) has silver in its wings, oh, may your grandma die! my yellow bride, aman! (×3) my tall beautiful dear.
Palandöken güzel dağ, leylim aman! aman! (×2) sarı gelin. Altı mor sümbüllü bağ ay nenen ölsün sarı gelin aman! (×3) suna yarim.	Palandoken is a beautiful mountain, my Leyli, aman! aman! (×2) yellow bride. Underneath has garden with purple hyacinth, oh, may your grandma die! my yellow bride aman! (×3) my tall beautiful dear.
Vermem seni ellere, leylim aman! aman! (×2) sarı gelin. Niceki bu halimse, ay! nenen ölsün, sarı gelin aman! (×3) suna yarim.	I don't give you to others, my Leyli, aman! aman! (×3) yellow bride. Till I am well (alive), oh, may your grandma die! my yellow bride, aman! (×2); My tall beautiful dear.

=== Kurdish Ser Le Ser Ranî ===
There are versions of this song in Sorani, the Kurdish language that is predominantly spoken in Iran and Iraqi Kurdistan. One of these versions was performed by Mohammad Mamle, a well-known Kurdish singer.

Yar bo min bê wefa bû Ser leser rranî, taku beyanî Bûn be mîwanî nazenînim	My boyfriend was not faithful for me He put his head on her thigh until the morning She was my lover's (new) guest
Dostî namîhrebanî Ser leser rranî, taku beyanî Bûn be mîwanî nazenînim	He is not a merciful lover He put his head on her thigh until the morning She was my lover's (new) guest
Zorim hewll legel da Ser leser rranî, taku beyanî Bûn be mîwanî nazenînim	I've tried so hard with him He put his head on her thigh until the morning She was my lover's (new) guest
Bê xeber bûm nemzanî Ser leser rranî, taku beyanî Bûn be mîwanî nazenînim	I didn't know about it He put his head on her thigh until the morning She was my lover's (new) guest

=== Persian Dāman Kešān ===
The Persian version is entitled Dāman Kešān (دامن کشان) or Sāqi e Mey Xārān (ساقی می خواران).

،دامن کشان ،ساقی می خواران ،از کنار یاران ،مست و گیسو افشان.می گریزد	Dragging her skirt, The cup-bearer of wine drinkers, past her suitors/friends, inebriated and with flowing hair, flees.
،در جام می ،از شرنگ دوری ،وز غم مهجوری ،چون شرابی جوشان.می بریزد	In the goblet of wine, from the sorrow of separation, and from the grief of parting, like boiling wine, she pours.
دارم قلبی لرزان ز غمش؛.دیده شد نگران ،ساقی می خواران ،از کنار یاران ،مست و گیسو افشان.می گریزد	I have a heart trembling because of her sorrow; my eyes have become distressed. The cup-bearer of wine drinkers, past her suitors/friends, inebriated and with flowing hair, flees.
دارم چشمی گریان ز رهش؛.روز و شب بشمارم تا بیاید	I have an eye crying before her way; I count days and nights until she comes.
آزرده دل ،از جفای یاری ،بی وفا دلداری ،ماه افسونکاری.شب نخفتم	Heartbroken from the anguish of a sweetheart, a disloyal beloved, a charming moonlike beauty, I didn't sleep at night.
با یادش تا ،دامن از کف دادم ،شد جهان از یادم.راز عشقش در دل تا نهفتم	With her memory, as I lost control, I forgot the world, while I hid the secret of her love in my heart.
ز چشمانش ریزد به دلم.شور عشق و امید ،دامن از کف دادم ،شد جهان از یادم.راز عشقش در دل تا نهفتم	From her eyes she pours into my heart the sensation of love and hope. I lost control, I forgot the world, while I hid the secret of her love in my heart.
دارم چشمی گریان ز رهش؛.روز و شب بشمارم تا بیاید	I have an eye crying before her way; I count day and night until she comes.

=== Greek Απ΄ τον Έρωτα στον Αχέροντα (Ap ton Erota ston Akheronta) ===
The composer of the music is anonymous. The Greek lyrics were written by Christos C. Papadopoulos.

== Parallels ==
While the Persian version is completely different, there are notable similarities between Armenian, Azerbaijani and Turkish version:

- The girl is from mountainous regions. The Turkish version boy encounters the girl in Erzurum market and suggests that she is from Palandöken mountain. The Armenian version girl is "sari" (from the mountain). and the Azerbaijani version boy calls the girl "tallest in the valley" and "shepherd".
- The girl is blond. In Azerbaijani and Turkish versions "Sari" means yellow. in the Azerbaijani version, where the story is about a Muslim boy in love with a Christian girl, It makes sense for "Sari" to mean blond, as it is a notable characteristic among predominantly dark haired people.
- The girl is tall, as Azerbaijani "uzunu" (the tallest) and Turkish "suna" (male duck. here: tall and beautiful) correspond.
- The boy says "aman!". The Arabic word "aman" (secure me / help / please) is an exclamation of lasting pain and long distress. It is used in Azerbaijani "neynim aman, aman" (what do I do? please!), Turkish "Leylim aman" (my Leyli, please!) and Armenian "dle aman" (my heart, please!).
- The boy and the girl are apart as told in Azerbaijani story, Azerbaijani line "seni mene vermezler" (They won't give you to me / let me marry you), Armenian Sari Gyalin line "I could not have the one I loved". Turkish line "I won't give you [up] to others" and In Armenian Sari Aghjik line "She left and chose someone else".
- The girl is called Leyli in Turkish line "leylim aman aman" (my leyli, please!) and the Armenian Sari Aghjik line "Leyli janin yar" (Leyla dear beloved). but this particular line is a Persian phrase referring to Layla the famous beloved. This can mean:
  - The girl is beloved, as Leyli is the famous object of desire.
  - The girl's name is Leyli.
  - The girl is insanely loved, but is impossible to get; especially if similarity to Romeo & Juliet is noticed, as widely done by Turks.
- The boy says "may your grandmother die" in Armenian and Turkish versions. It may be:
  - A curse.
  - That grandmother might have a real role in parting the lovers.
- The girl may have been taken away from the boy, and even given to someone else: In the last part of Turkish lyric found in some sources, the boy says "I won't give you [up] to others", and in some of its variations, the girl writes the boy's death sentence. In the Persian version the girl is unkind and flees away. Both Armenian versions, are about the boy complaining that the unkind girl has rejected him. In Armenian Sari Aghjik, the girl has chosen someone else over him.

If the statements are taken as complementary rather than just similar, the Muslim Turk (language of both Azerbaijan and Turkey) boy has fallen in love with a Christian Armenian/Kipchak blond maiden from the mountains and valleys, probably close to Palandöken; But they are kept apart, and the unkind girl is taken away, causing the boy to lament and curse frequently.

== Cultural impact ==
=== In Armenia ===
- In the twentieth century Pavel Lisitsian, the Armenian-Soviet opera singer and national artist of the USSR interpreted his own version of the folk song in the Armenian language.
- In 2013 Armenian singer Andre, who represented Armenia at the Eurovision Song Contest 2006 released his version of "Sari Aghjik" (Սարի աղջիկ) and a music video for the song.
- Armenian recording artist Emmy, who was the Armenian representative at the Eurovision Song Contest 2011 released her own version of the song and shot a music video for it in 2014.
- In 2016, Sona Rubenyan, the winner of the fifth edition of the Armenian television hit show Hay Superstar, performed her version of the song in Armenian during Arena Live TV show.
- In 2016, the folk group Gata Band (also participants in Armenia's national selection for Eurovision Song Contest 2018) performed their version of the song in Armenian.
- On May 31, 2020, Garik and Sona released their version of the song in Armenian and a music video.
- In 2020, the melody of "Sari Aghjik" was used as a soundtrack for Armenia TV's television series of the same name.

=== In Azerbaijan ===
- The story was retold by the prominent early 20th Century Azerbaijani poet and playwright Huseyn Javid in his play Sheikh Sanan featuring a Muslim boy and a Christian girl.
- The story has also been adapted into a film directed by Yaver Rzayev called Sari Gelin (1999); which was Azerbaijan's first feature film, shown in 2000 at the London and Karlovy Vary Film Festivals. It is about the country's fight with Armenia. The protagonist, is a boy named Gadir. He has a vision of a bride dressed in yellow, which in both cultures is a symbol of death and the cruelties of fate.
- There is an Azerbaijani musical ensemble called "Sari Gelin";
- Azerbaijani artist Safura, who was the Azerbaijani representative at the Eurovision Song Contest 2010 released her own version of the song.
- Latvian artist Anmary, who was the Latvian representative at the Eurovision Song Contest 2012 during her visit in Azerbaijan also released her own version of the song and shot a music video for it in 2012 in Baku.
- On 18 December 2013 during a concert of Italian singers, at the Baku Crystal Hall, one of the most popular Italian singers Toto Cutugno sang "Sari Gelin" in Azerbaijani language.
- On 23 November 2014 during the concert Lara Fabian, which was held at the Heydar Aliyev Palace, sang Sari Gelin in Azerbaijani.
- In 2014 Azerbaijani-British singer Sami Yusuf sang and released versions of "Sari Gelin" in Azerbaijani and English.
- In 2014 Azerbaijani dancer Oksana Rasulova presented music video "Sari Gelin".

=== In Iran ===
- The Persian version was performed by Viguen, who was a prominent Iranian pop and jazz singer of Armenian descent.
- A Central Kurdish version of the song was performed by Mohammad Mamle, a well-known musician, singer and political activist from Mahabad.
- The song was featured in 2006 collaboration album Endless Vision by eminent musicians Djivan Gasparyan and Hossein Alizadeh, which was nominated for a Grammy Award for Best Traditional World Music Album at the 49th Grammy Awards. The album was recorded at the Niavaran Palace of Tehran, and was released through Hermes Records (Iran) and World Village (United States).

=== In Turkey ===
- The Turkish multiethnic / multicultural group Kardeş Türküler recorded it as "Sari Gyalin (Dağlı Gelin)" in their 1997 self-titled album Kardeş Türküler on Kalan Ses Görüntü label.
- A controversial documentary with the same title as the song (due to it being linked to Armenians in Turkey) was distributed in Turkish schools that shows denial of the Armenian Genocide. It received several criticism.
- In 2017, Cem Adrian released a video on YouTube singing this song recorded live in 2010.

=== International ===
- In 2014, British-Azerbaijani Muslim singer Sami Yusuf recorded a bilingual version, mainly in English but ending with Azerbaijani lyrics on his 2014 album The Centre released on Andante Records.

== See also ==
- Suzan Suzi
- Ahcik
- Karadır kaşların ferman yazdırır
- Gelin Ayşe
