= Sananta Tanty =

Indian poet (1952–2021)

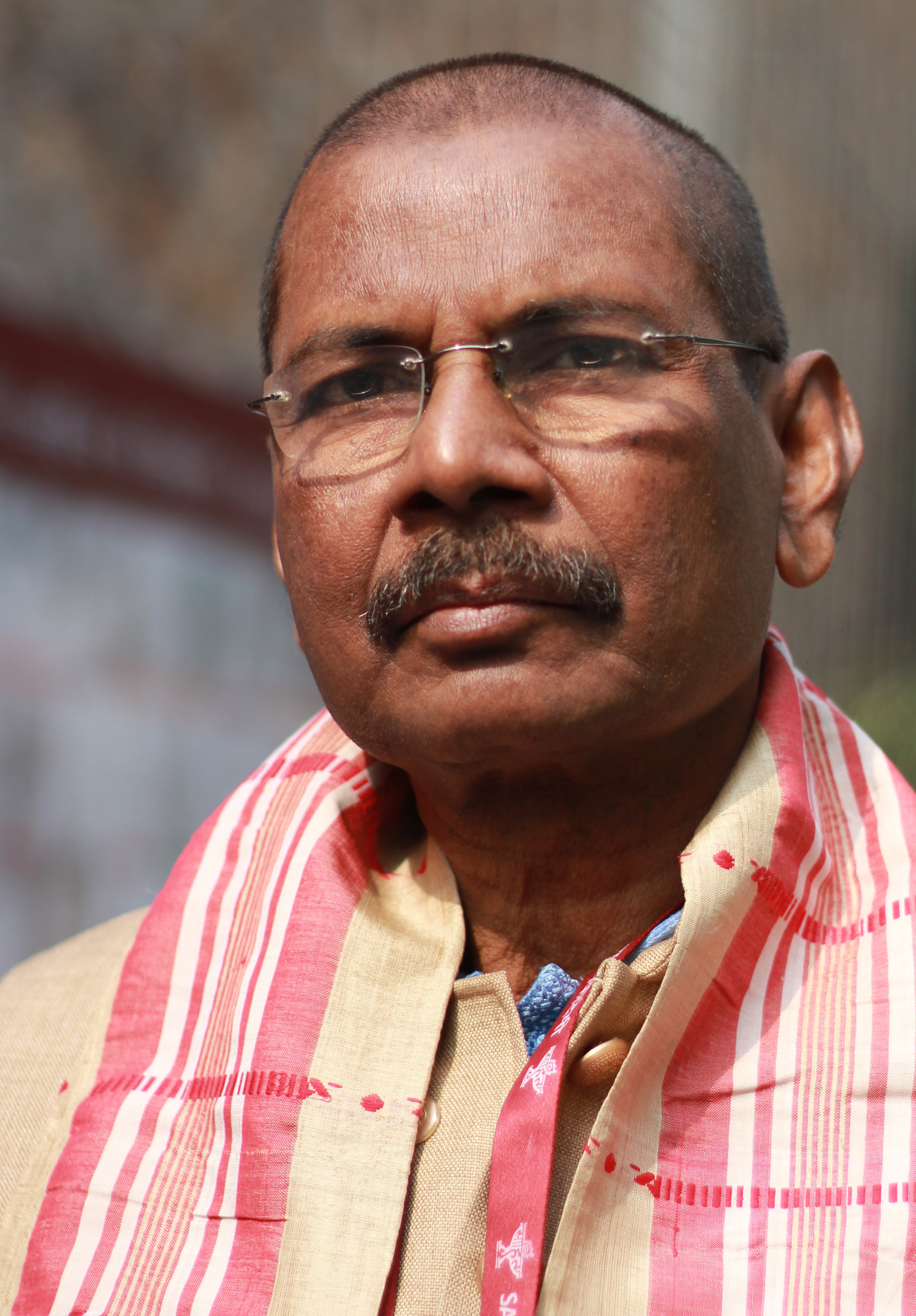
- Born: 4 November 1952; Kalinagar Tea Estate, Karimganj, Assam, India
- Died: 25 November 2021 (aged 69); New Delhi, India
- Education: St. Anthony's College, Shillong; Jorhat College, Jorhat; Dibru College, Dibrugarh
- Occupation: Poet
- Spouse: Minati Tanty (m. 1986)
- Children: 2
- Writing career
- Notable work: Kailoir Dinto Amar Hobo
- Notable awards: Sahitya Akademi Award (2018); Assam Valley Literary Award (2017)

Sananta Tanty (4 November 1952 – 25 November 2021) was an Indian poet of Assamese literature. Tanty was born to an Odia family in Kalinagar Tea Estate. Tanty completed his secondary education at a Bengali-medium school but continued his literary works in the mainland Assamese language. Tanty received numerous awards and distinctions, including the 2018 Sahitya Akademi Award for "Kailoir Dinto Amar Hobo" (Tomorrow Will be Ours), a collection of his poems.

According to the website Asymptote, Tanty is "a chronicler of the times and an advocate for the downtrodden" and "a poet of change and of unbridled optimism".

== Early life and education ==
Sananta Tanty was born on 4 November 1952 to Loke Nath Tanty and Baitarani Tanty in Kalinagar Tea Estate in the district of Karimganj of Assam, near the India-Bangladesh border. He started his education at a primary school in Kalinagar Tea Estate and finished his secondary education in the science stream at Ram Krishna Vidyapeeth Senior Secondary School, Ram Krishna Nagar located 2 km (1.2 miles) away from his home in 1969. Sananta Tanty then went to Shillong to study at St. Anthony's College but had to discontinue his studies because his parents were unable to afford his education. He then went to work in Jorhat, where he attended night classes at Jorhat Amalgamated College, finally graduating from Dibru College (under Dibrugarh University) as a private candidate in 1975.

== Career ==
Tanty started his professional career as an employee of Assam Tea Employees' Provident Fund Organisation in Jorhat in 1971. Subsequently, he joined office of the Directorate of Information and Public Relations, Government of Assam, as a Sub-Divisional Information and Public Relations Officer in Guwahati. He then joined the Assam Tea Employees' Provident Fund Organisation as an officer in the Public Relations department and became Senior Public Relations Officer, finally retiring from service in 2012 as Deputy Provident Fund Commissioner. Tanty was given an extension for another one and a half years after his retirement as an Officer on Special Duties.

== Personal life and death ==
Sananta Tanty married Smt. Minati Tanty (formerly Minati Kakati) from North Lakhimpur on 18 February 1986. They had two sons; Swagat (born 1988) and Tathagat (born 1994). Tanty died on 25 November 2021 at the age of 69 in a private hospital in New Delhi. He suffered from cancer and was under treatment for a long time prior to his death.

== Positions held ==
Positions Tanty held:

- Member, Executive Committee, Children’s Literary Trust, Government of Assam
- Member (nominated), Central Working Committee, Asom Sahitya Sabha
- Member, Advisory Committee, All India Radio, Guwahati
- Member, Assamese Language Advisory Board, Sahitya Akademi
- Member, Working Committee, Public Relations Society – North-east Branch

== Published works ==
Works include:

- Ujjol Nakhyatror Sandhanot (Poetry book, Trend, Guwahati, January 1981)
- Moi Manuhor Amal Utsav (Poetry Book, LBS Publication, Guwahati, November 1985)
- Nizor Biruddhey Sesh Prastab (Poetry Book, LBS Publication, Guwahati, August 1990)
- Sabdat Othoba Sabdahinotat (Poetry Book, LBS Publication, Guwahati, 1993)
- Mrityur Agar Stoppageot (Poetry Book, LBS Publication, Guwahati, 1996)
- Toponito Ketiaba Barisha Ahey (Poetry Book, LBS Publication, Guwahati, 1997)
- Dhuan Sar Sopun (Poetry Book, Puthi Niketan, Guwahati, 1999)
- Dirno Bosontor Saurav (Poetry Book, Journal Emporium, Nalbari, 2002)
- Apuni Apunar Hotey Yudhha Koribo Paribone (Poetry Book, Seuji Seuji, Nankar Bhaira, Nalbari, 2004)
- Moi (Poetry Book, Seuji Seuji, Naakar Bhaira, Nalbari, 2008)
- Mur Nirabhoron Atmar Sokaboho Sobdobur (Poetry Book, Seuji Seuji, Naakar Bhaira, Nalbari, 2010)
- Kailoir Dinto Amar Hobo (Poetry Book, Aank Baak, Guwahati, December 2013)
- Mur Priyo Sopunor Osore Panzore (Poetry Book, Faculty Books, Guwahati, April 2017)
- Selected Poems Sananta Tanty (Translated into English by Dibyojyoti Sharma, Eye Right Imprint, New Delhi, 2017)

=== In-press ===
- Kavita Samagra :SanantaTanty (Editor: Kushal Dutta, Papyrus Publication, Guwahati)
- Karimganjorpora Relerre Ahonte (Poetry Book, Aank Baak, Guwahati)

His works have been translated into many languages in the country and abroad.

== Awards and recognition ==
Awards received:

- 1992, Mrinalini Devi Goswami Memorial Award, conferred by Asom Poets Society, Assam
- 2002, Bir Birsa Munda Award, conferred by Dalit Sahitya Akademi – Assam Chapter
- 2011, Usman Ali Sadagar Samannay Award, Char-Chapori Sahitya Parishad, Assam
- 2014, Krantikal Sahitya Samann, conferred by Krantikal Publishers, Nagaon, Assam
- 2015, Sailadhar Rajkhowa Award, conferred by Asom Sahitya Sabha, Assam
- 2016, Padmanath Vidyavinod Smriti Sahitya Purashkar, conferred by Ramanath Bhattacharyya Foundation, Mumbai
- 2017, Assam Valley Literary Award, conferred by Williamson Magor Education Trust, Assam
- 2018, Sahitya Akademi Award Conferred by Sahitya Akademi, Government of India
- 2020, Meghraj Karmakar Sahitya Award, Conferred by Assam Tea Community Sahitya Sabha, Assam

== Impact and legacy ==
While growing up, Sananta Tanty read a lot of Bengali literature at home. His poetry portrays the emotions of a downtrodden people. Hope plays a big part in the poetry of Tanty as he conjures contrasting planes of thought into his works. The plight of the tea gardeners, their lives, a deep sense of longing along with a determined choice to elicit changes in their lives is prominent in verses of Tanty's poetry. His left-wing radicalism and sensitivity are prominent themes in his work.

During his time in Jorhat, Sananta Tanty came in contact with many prominent litterateurs of the state, which prompted him to learn the Assamese language. He began writing for a magazine, then edited by Dr. Nagen Saikia, for which he began to gain attention. Journalist Rajiv Konwar credits him with revolutionising the field of modern Assamese poetry, and he is considered by The Indian Express as one of the stalwarts in the state today in the field of literature.

== See also ==
- List of Indian writers
- List of Indian poets
- Assamese literature
- History of Assamese literature
- Assamese cinema
- Culture of Assam

== See also ==
1. as:সনন্ত তাঁতি
