= Dear Dad (disambiguation) =

Dear Dad was the 12th episode of the first season of the American TV series M*A*S*H.

Dear Dad may also refer to:

- Dear Dad...Again of M*A*S*H
- Dear Dad... Three of M*A*S*H
- Dear Dad (Medium), an episode of Medium, an American television series
- Dear Dad, an episode of Council of Dads (TV series), an American television series
- Dear Dad, an episode of British children's television series The Story of Tracy Beaker (series 4)
- Dear Dad (2016 film), Hindi film
- Dear Dad, Russian comedy film starring Vladimir Vdovichenkov
- "Dear Dad", track from The Journey (Ky-Mani Marley album)
- "Dear Dad", track from Chuck Berry in London
- "Dear Dad", track from We Were Here (Turin Brakes album)
- "Dear Dad", track from The Masters Apprentices (1967 album)
- "Dear Dad", track from First Born (The Plot in You album)
- "Dear Dad", track from "Music of Battlestar Galactica"
- "Dear Dad", reggae single by Ky-Mani Marley
- Dear Dad, album by Zack Knight
- Dear Dad, 2006 book by Bradley Trevor Greive
- Caro papà, English title: Dear Dad, in List of Don Matteo episodes

== See also ==
- Dear Father (disambiguation)
- Dear Mom (disambiguation)
