= Itihas (1995 film) =

- Directed by: Bhabendra Nath Saikia
- Written by: Bhabendra Nath Saikia
- Starring: Nikumoni Barua; Tapan Das; Biju Phukan
- Cinematography: Kamal Nayak
- Music by: Indreswar Sarma
- Release date: 12 October 1995
- Country: India
- Language: Assamese

Itihas (transl. Exploration) is a 1995 Indian Assamese language family drama film directed by Bhabendra Nath Saikia and starring Nikumoni Barua, Tapan Das and Biju Phukan.

The film is about the demoralization of society.

== Cast ==
- Nikumoni Barua
- Tapan Das
- Biju Phukan

== Reception ==
Reviewing the film at the Indian Panorama section of the International Film Festival of India, S. R. Ashok Kumar of The Hindu wrote that "The film has family sentiment, emotions and the required twists and turns needed for a movie. But the artistes Nikumoni Barua, Tapan Das, Biju Phukan have not risen to the occasion".

== Awards ==
- National Film Award for Best Feature Film in Assamese (1996)
