= Arupa Kalita Patangia =

Assamese writer (born 1956)

- Born: Golaghat, Assam, India
- Education: Debraj Roy College; Gauhati University
- Occupations: Novelist, writer, professor
- Writing career
- Language: Assamese
- Notable work: Mariam Austin Othoba Hira Barua
- Notable awards: Sahitya Akademi Award; Bharatiya Bhasha Parishad Award

Arupa Kalita Patangia was born in 1956 and is an Indian novelist and short story writer and known for her fiction writing in Assamese. Her literary awards include: the Bharatiya Bhasha Parishad award, the Katha Prize and the Prabina Saikia Award. In 2014, she received the prestigious Sahitya Akademi Award for her short stories book named Mariam Austin Othoba Hira Barua. Her books have been translated to English, Hindi, and Bengali. Her works touch upon Assamese history and culture, addressing the lives people from middle and lower income brackets, and focus specifically on concerns of women, violence, and insurgency.

== Biography ==
She studied at Golaghat Mission Girls High School, and Debraj Roy College, and completed her PhD from Gauhati University on Pearl S. Buck's women characters. Arupa Patangia Kalita taught English at Tangla College, Darrang, Assam and retired as Head of the English Department of Tangla College on 22 June 2016.

== Literary works ==
She has more than ten novels and short story collections to her credit. Some of these include:

Novels

- Mriganabhi (1987),
- Ayananta
- Millenniumar Sapon (2002)
- Marubhumit Menaka Aru Anyanya,
- Kaitat Keteki,
- Rongamatir Paharto
- Felanee etc.

Short Stories

- Mariam Austin Othoba Hira Barua

Translated novels

- Dawn: A Novel, an English translation of Ayananta by Ranjita Biswas, was published by Zubaan, New Delhi. It has also been translated into Hindi.
- Felanee, another important novel, was translated into English by Deepika Phukan (also published by Zubaan) and shortlisted for the Crossword Book Award.
- The Invitation is an English translation, by Arunabha Bhuyan, of Patangia Kalita's Assamese work Handpicked Fictions.
- ‘’The Loneliness of Hira Barua’’ translated by Ranjita Biswas, 2020

Feature Films

- Arupa Patangia Kalita has written the dialogues for the critically acclaimed Assamese feature film Kothanodi (The River of Fables).

She released a collection of her short-stories, Alekjaan Banur Jaan, at the 20th Guwahati Book Fair. Her short stories have been translated into several languages, including English, Hindi, and Bengali.

A leading feminist from the North-East, she also writes extensively on questions of women and society. She has stated an interview that, "I’m a woman and hence I write about women in my society.... In this uneven society that I belong to, I always feel I have a lot of say about women, as a woman." Specifically on the question of feminism, she has rejected labels, stating that "You can call me a feminist or a humanist, but I feel being a feminist and a humanist are not contradictory."

== Awards ==
Kalita's literary awards include:

- Sahitya Akademi Award (2014),
- Bharatiya Bhasha Parishad Award,
- Katha Award
- Prabina Saikia Award
- Assam Valley Literary Award

=== Rejection of the Basanti Devi Award ===
She famously declined an award from the Asam Sahitya Sabha, on grounds of it being in the 'women-only' category. In an interview, Patangia stated that her reasons for rejecting the Basanti Devi Award were on the following grounds:

"A text is a text, written by a woman or a man. I feel, after it is published and given away to the readers to judge, it should be considered merely as a text and judged according to its merit as a text, not on the basis of gender. Even men have written about woman sensitively, and some immortal female characters in literature have been created by male writers. When questions of merit and judgment come in, a writer should be treated as a writer, not as a male or female writer."
