= Boiragimoth =

- Suburb
- Location in Assam, India Boiragimoth (India)
- Coordinates: 27.47033°N 94.93020°E
- Country: India
- State: Assam
- District: Dibrugarh
- Elevation: 94 m (308 ft)

Languages
  - Official: Assamese
- Time zone: UTC+5:30 (IST)
- PIN: 786003
- Telephone code: 0373
- Vehicle registration: AS-06 - XX - XXXX

Boiragimoth is a suburb of Dibrugarh city in Assam, consisting of several residential neighbourhoods and local markets. It is considered one of the most popular residential areas in the town, with shops, restaurants, schools, colleges, boarding houses, places of worship, sports facilities, and so on.

== Name origin ==
Boiragimoth's name traces its origin to the Ahom kingdom. According to folklore, Loraa Rojaa (Sulikphaa - Ratnadhwaj Singha 1679–1681), the then Ahom monarch, started maiming his royal kin in an attempt to maintain his hold over the throne. One of his cousins fled the capital, Garhgaon, now in Sibsagar district, and started living in this area disguised as a "Boiragi" or hermit and founded a "Moth" (monastery). So, Boiragimoth means Hermit's Monastery.

== Location ==
Boiragimoth is a sub-urban revenue circle belonging to the Dibrugarh East circle. The Convoy Road, which traverses the area, divides the locality into two State Assembly seats: The north is under the Dibrugarh Block which is part of the Dibrugarh Assembly constituency, and the south of Convoy Road is under the Borbaruah Block, which is under the Lahowal Assembly constituency . To the west lies the green, lush expanse of the Jalan Nagar South tea estate.

== Demographics ==
Though it has its existence since Ahom regime, but over time, the demography has become pan-Assamese, consisting of people from entire Assam. Unlike other localities in Assam, Boiragimoth is basically an Assamese society with deep roots in Assamese Culture, Traditions, and Literature. People from other parts of India are also dwelling in the region.
In 1950, the Medog earthquake measuring over 8.6 on the Richter Scale, changed the course of the Brahmaputra River, and this caused the destruction of more than 3/4ths of the city. The District Administration in and around 1960 allotted plots for homeless people mostly belonging from Nagakhulia, Panchali, and Tinkunia, who have lost their properties in the devastating quake and erosion.

== Religion ==
People of all faiths are existing harmoniously in the vicinity. Hindus, Muslims, Sikhs, Jains, Buddhists, and Christians are practising their respective faiths.

== Places of Worship ==
Boiragimoth has Naamghars for the Vaishnavites, Mosques for the followers of Islam, Shiva Mandir for the Hindus.

== Education ==
Boiragimoth has from Lower Primary Schooling up to higher levels of education.

Higher Secondary School/College:

- Dibru College
- Salt Brook Academy
- Sri Sri Aniruddhadeva Junior College, Dibrugarh

Vocational

- Saint Vincenza Gerosa Institute of Nursing.

== Health Facilities ==
Boiragimoth has several healthcare in the area. Including a prominent mental hospital in Assam. Additionally, primary Health Centre serves the basic needs of the local population.

1. State Primary Health Centre. Malakhubasa Bye-Lane No.2
2. Saint Vincenza Gerosa Hospital. Convoy Road
3. Kairali Ayurveda Hospital. Convoy Road

Moreover, people can avail the emergency medical service just by dialing 108 from any network. There is also Assam Medical College and Hospital just 6 km away.

== Sports ==
The Jalan Outdoor Stadium of Dibrugarh district is located at the heart of Boiragimoth. The residents takes the pleasure of either viewing or participating in various outdoor sports. Apart from sporting facilities, the locality has various Sports Clubs which have bought laurels to the region.

Primarily, Navarupa Sangha is the sporting club with various winning histories in sporting events in and around the state of Assam.

== Communication ==
As it is a suburb it is well accessed by rail, road, river, and air.

Rail
The New Dibrugarh Railway Station is located here. It is just 2 km from the centre & 10 km away from Dibrugarh town Railway station.

Road
The Assam State Road Transport Terminus is just 2.2 km from here, which is located at Chowkidingee.

Air
The Dibrugarh Airport is located 13 km from here and can be accessed via Convoy Road, then NH-37, next Airport Road at Mohanbari.

River Port
The nearest river port is situated at Panchali, Dibrugarh, on the banks of the river Brahmaputra.

== Important offices and premises ==
The All India Radio Station of Dibrugarh is located at the convoy Road. All necessary programmes are produced here.

The Assam State Electricity Board (ASEB) is having its Power Grid control, Transmission, Engineering, and Administrative Offices here for the entire Dibrugarh district.

The Assam Gas Company Limited having its administrative and maintenance office here and is next to V.G.Hospital, off Convoy Road.

The District Employment Exchange is located near Convoy Road Tiniali/ Tee Point.

The Food Corporation of India is having its operating food storage godowns near Convoy Road Tiniali/ Tee Point.

The Asomiya Pratidin, an Assamese daily newspaper is having its printing press cum circulation and editorial premises at the Convoy Road.

The Janasadharan, another Assamese daily is having its printing press cum circulation and editorial premises behind outdoor stadium.
