= Chandraprabha Saikiani =

Indian social reformer, writer and freedom fighter (1901–1972)

Chandraprava Saikiani
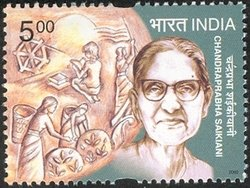
- Postal stamp of Chandraprabha.
- Born: Chandrapriya Das; 16 March 1901; Daisingari, Assam, India
- Died: 16 March 1972 (aged 71); Daisingari, Assam, India
- Other name: Chandraprabha Saikiani
- Occupations: Social reformer, writer
- Years active: 1918-1972
- Known for: All Assam Pradeshik Mahila Samiti
- Spouse: Dandinath Kalita
- Children: 1
- Awards: Padma Shri

Chandraprabha Saikiani (16 March 1901 – 16 March 1972) or Chandraprava Saikiani was an Assamese freedom fighter, activist, writer and social reformer considered to be the pioneer of the feminist movement in Assam. She was the founder of The All Assam Pradeshik Mahila Samiti, a non governmental organization working for the welfare of the women of Assam and was a recipient of the fourth highest Indian civilian award of Padma Shri for the year 1972 from the Government of India. Three decades later, the Indian government issued a commemorative stamp on Saikiani under the series, Social Reformers, in 2002.

She also took proactive role in the Civil Disobedience Movement of 1932 and Non-Cooperation Movement of 1920–1921. Contesting elections for the Legislative Assembly, she became the first woman to foray in politics in Independent India. Saikiani was also a noted poet and prolific writer.

== Early life ==
She was born as "Chandrapriya Mazumdar" (Chandrapriya Das) on 16 March 1901 to Ratiram Mazumdar (a village headman) and Gangapriya Mazumdar at Daisingari village of the Bajali district in the Northeast Indian state of Assam. She was the seventh of eleven children and choose the name "Chandraprabha Saikiani" for herself.

Accompanied by her sister Rajaniprabha Saikiani (who later on became the first woman doctor of Assam), they waded through waist deep mud to attend a boys' school (there was no girls' school) several kilometers away. Their endeavour impressed Nilkanta Barua, a school sub-inspector, and she was awarded a scholarship to the Nagaon Mission School. At Nagaon Mission School, she protested against the school authorities who did not allow a girl to stay at hostel after rejecting a proposal to convert to Christianity. She finally saw the result of her protest: the authorities admitted induct the girl into the hostel.

After school, she gathered local illiterate girls and taught them what she learnt at school at a makeshift shed near the school. Her social activism started here when she protested against the allegedly discriminatory treatment meted out to Hindu students by the hostel superintendent.

She refused to honour her parents' commitment to marry her off to an elderly person and got engaged to Dandinath Kalita, an Assamese writer. The relationship resulted in Saikiani becoming a mother out of marriage and she remained a spinster for life after Kalita married another woman. She was reported to have faced strong opposition from the conservative society in bringing up her son as a single mother but her life in Tezpur brought her opportunities to meet and interact with social and cultural leaders such as Chandranath Sharma, Omeo Kumar Das, Jyotiprasad Agarwalla and Lakhidhar Sarma.

== Social and political life ==
Saikiani started her career as a teacher at a primary school in Nagaon and later, became the headmistress of the Girls' M. E. School, Tezpur.

During her stay at Tezpur she associated with luminaries like Jyotiprasad Agarwala, Omeo Kumar Das, Chandra Nath Sarma, Lakhidhar Sarma. In 1918, at Tezpur session of Asom Chhatra Sanmilan, she was the only female delegate and addressed a huge throng on the harmful effects of opium eating and asked for its ban. It was the first event where an Assamese woman spoke in front of a large gathering.

Affected by the rise of nationalism in 1921, she joined the non co-operation movement of Mahatma Gandhi and worked to spread the message among women of Tezpur. She was an invited speaker at the Nagaon session of the Assam Sahitya Sabha in 1925 where she called upon the women attendees who were seated in a separate enclosure to break the barriers and the women heeded her call to come out to the open area. Returning to her village, she joined Kaljirapara school as a teacher but resigned her job when she was denied permission to attend the Guwahati session of the Indian National Congress. She continued her social activism and founded Assam Pradeshik Mahila Samiti in 1926 to act against child marriage, polygamy and the discrimination of women at the temples and to take up issues like women's education and self-employment. Her efforts were reported in getting the Hayagriva Madhava Temple, Hajo, near Guwahati opened to women. Her involvement with the civil disobedience movement landed her in jail in 1930 and later in 1943, she was jailed again while participating in the non co-operation movement.

After the Indian independence, she joined the Socialist Party but returned to the Indian National Congress and unsuccessfully contested in the 1957 Assam Legislative Assembly elections. Her son, Atul Saikia, is a politician and a former member of Assam Legislative Assembly.

== Literary activities, awards and recognitions ==
Saikiani published her first short story in a local magazine, Bahi, in 1918 aged 17 followed by several novels such as Pitribhitha (The Paternal Home) (1937), Sipahi Bidrohat (Sepoy Mutiny), Dillir Sinhasan (Throne of Delhi) and Kavi Anav Ghosh. She served as the editor of Mahila Samiti's Assamese journal Abhijatri for a period of seven years and also headed the Al India Assam Peasants' Conference.

Chandraprabha Saikiani was a noted poet and a prolific writer. She also published a novel titled Pitribhita in 1937. The Government of India honoured her with Padmashree in 1972 shortly after her death. Again in 2002, the Government of India released a commemorative stamp in her honour.

== Death and legacy ==
Saikiani died on her 71st birthday on 16 March 1972 succumbing to cancer. A couple of months before her death, the Government of India awarded her the civilian honour of Padma Shri in 1972. She was honoured again in 2002 by the government when a commemorative postage stamp was issued by the Department of Posts in 2002 under the series, social reformers. The government polytechnic in Kamrup, Guwahati is named after her and the Tezpur University established a women's centre in her name, Chandraprabha Saikiani Center for Women's Studies (CSCWS) in 2009 for promoting women's education in the Northeast India.

Her life has been documented in four biographies:

- Agnisnata Chandraprabha (1998) by Pushpalata Das,
- Chandraprabha Saikiani (2001) by Achyut Kumar Sharma,
- Muktixongrami Chandraprabha (2002) by Hironmoyi Devi and
- Chandraprabha [2011] by Anjali Sarma.

Abhiyatri: One Life Many Rivers, a novel by Nirupama Borgohain, renowned Assamese novelist and wife of Homen Borgohain, is a fictionalised account of Saikiani's life and the novel went on to win the Sahitya Akademi award in 1996. Later on Prodipto Borgohain translated Abhijatri into English and won the Sahitya Akademi Award.

== See also ==
- Jyotiprasad Agarwalla
- Homen Borgohain
- Pushpalata Das
