= Prantik =

Assamese magazine

- Cover page
- Editor: Pradeep Baruah
- Former editors: Bhabendra Nath Saikia
- Categories: Entertainment
- Frequency: Fortnightly
- Publisher: Pradeep Baruah
- Founded: 1981; 45 years ago
- Country: India
- Language: Assamese

Prantik is a multi-topic Assamese language magazine published fortnightly from Guwahati in Assam since 1981.

The founding chief editor of the magazine was Bhabendra Nath Saikia. The founding editor was Pradip Baruah, who is also its present editor after more than three decades.

Presently, it is still being published fortnightly. Some of its articles include "Buddhi Jukti" and "Letters from Canada". Pages from Bhabendra Nath Saikia's diary are published on the last page of each issue.
