= Rongbong Terang =

Indian academic and writer

- Born: Rongbong Terang; 13 January 1937 (age 89); Lumbungdingpi (near Bokoliaghat/Volongkom-aji), Karbi Anglong, India
- Occupations: Academic, Novelist, Poet
- Spouse: Kanam Hansepi
- Children: 4
- Writing career
- Language: Karbi, Assamese
- Notable work: Rongmilir Hanhi (1981)
- Notable awards: Padma Shri (1989); Assam Valley Literary Award (2008)

Rongbong Terang is a literary figure from Assam, India. He is a Padmashree Awardee for his literary work Rongmilir Hanhi (1981).

Terang was given Lifetime Achievement award at Pratidin Achiever Award 2021, Lummer Dai Award in 2019, he is conferred with Honorary DLitt from Cotton University in May 2022.

== Education ==
He studied in Lanka High School. He was in the first batch to pass out of the school. After that he completed his graduation from Nowgong College in Assamese as his honours. In 1966, he completed his post graduation from Gauhati University.

== Career ==
Rongbong Terang worked as an Assamese teacher in Diphu Govt. Boy High School. Then as an Assamese lecturer in Diphu Govt. College and acted as Principal-in-charge on 1 April 2000 and retired on 30 November 2002. He was also the president of Asam Sahitya Sabha for two terms.

=== Selected works ===
- Rongmilir Hahi (1981)
- Srimad Bhagawad Gita (1986)
- Samanway Prabah (1989)
- Faringor Geet (1990)
- Smritir Papori (1998)
- Neela Orchid (2001)
- Krantikalar Ashru (2005)
- Jak Herowa Pakhi (2005)
- Langsoliator Kukrung (2007)

== Awards ==
- Asam Sahitya Sabha's Bishnu Rabha (1982)
- Asom Prakashan Parishad (1983)
- Padma Shri (1989)
- Assam Valley Literary Award (2008)
- Asam Sahitya Sabha's Basudev Jalan award (2008)
- Mahapurush Madhavdev (2008)
