= Assam Valley Literary Award =

Annual writer award

- Civilian award for contributions to Assamese literature
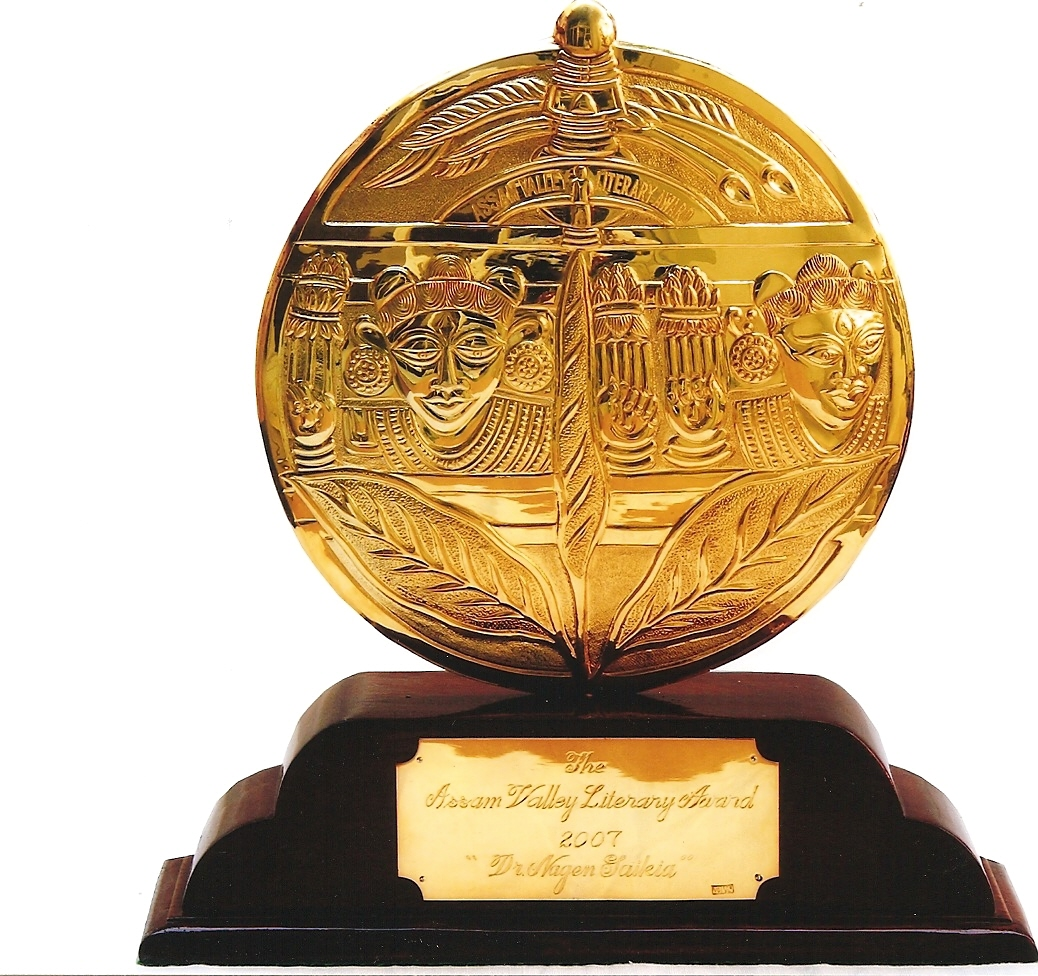
- Awarded for: Contributions to Assamese literature
- Sponsored by: Williamson Magor Education Trust
- First award: 1990

Highlights
- First winner: Dr Bhabendranath Saikia

The Assam Valley Literary Award (Assamese: অসম উপত্যকা সাহিত্য বঁটা) was conceived in the year 1990 by Williamson Magor Education Trust to honour creative writers who have enhanced Assamese literature.

It is given to writers of Assam once a year. The award was instituted by the Williamson Magor Group, a tea company.

== History ==
The award was announced by Shri B.M. Khaitan, Chairman, Williamson Magor Group of Industries, Tea major at the foundation stone laying ceremony of the Assam Valley School on 11 February 1990, at Harchurah in Sonitpur district of Assam.

The award comprises cash award, a scroll of honour made of Assam "Muga" silk and a specially designed golden trophy. This trophy has been designed by the artist of Assam, Shri Shobha Brahma.

== Award winners ==
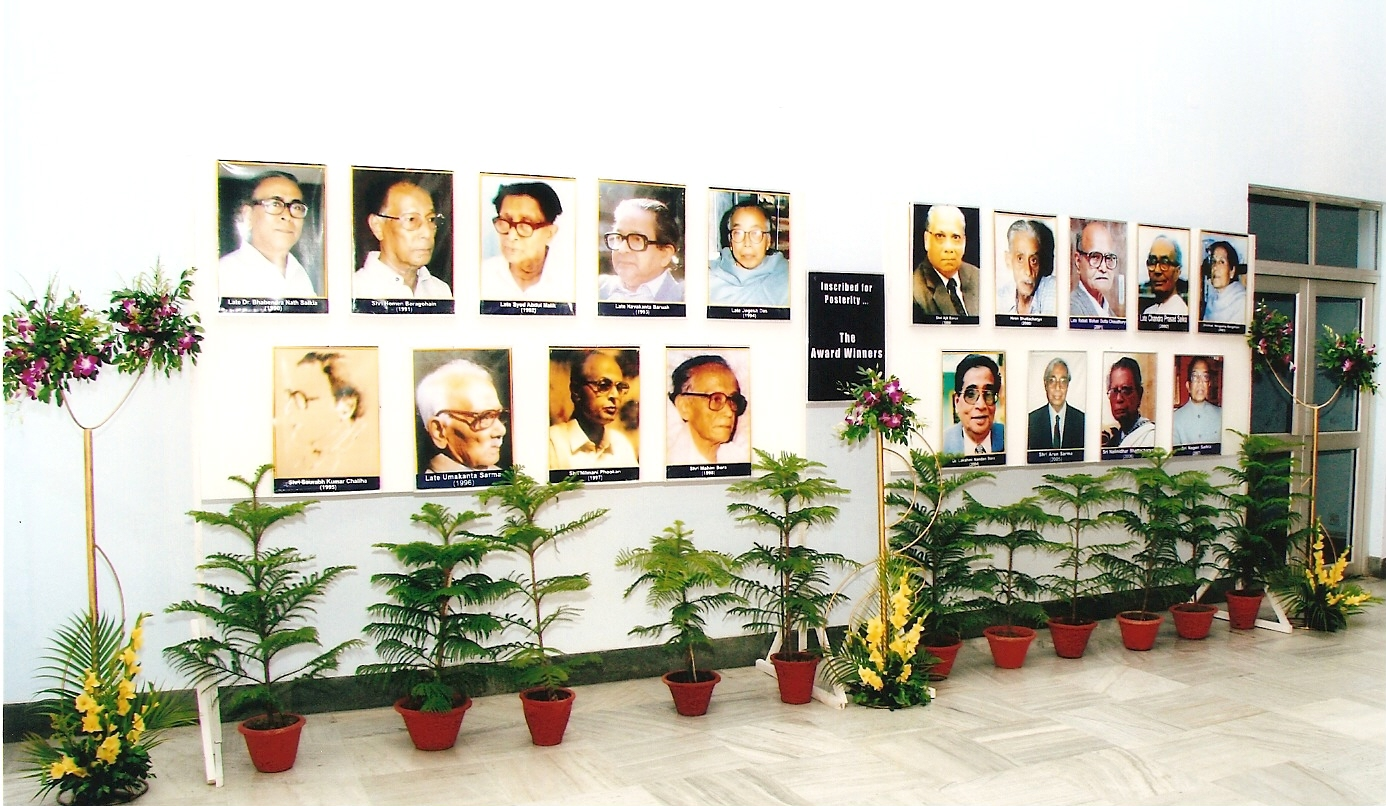
The Winners

Year Winner

- 1990 Bhabendra Nath Saikia
- 1991 Homen Borgohain
- 1992 Syed Abdul Malik
- 1993 Nabakanta Barua
- 1994 Jogesh Das
- 1995 Saurabh Kumar Chaliha
- 1996 Umakanta Sharma
- 1997 Nilamani Phookan
- 1998 Mahim Bora
- 1999 Ajit Barua
- 2000 Hiren Bhattacharya
- 2001 Sheelabhadra (Rebati Mohan Dutta Choudhury)
- 2002 Chandra Prasad Saikia
- 2003 Nirupama Borgohain
- 2004 Lakshmi Nandan Bora
- 2005 Arun Sharma (dramatist)
- 2006 Nalinidhar Bhattacharya
- 2007 Nagen Saikia
- 2008 Rongbong Terang
- 2009 Imran Shah
- 2010 Harekrishna Deka
- 2011 Purobi Bormudoi
- 2012 Sameer Tanti
- 2013 Atulananda Goswami
- 2014 Hirendra Nath Dutta
- 2015 Apurba Sharma
- 2016 Dr. Arupa Kalita Patangia
- 2017 Sananta Tanty, Yeshe Dorjee Thongchi, Dr. Rita Chowdhury
