= Folklore of Assam =

1972 book by Jogesh Das

- Author: Jogesh Das
- Language: English
- Series: Folklore of India
- Subject: Folklore of Assam
- Publisher: National Book Trust
- Publication date: 1972
- Publication place: Assam, India
- Media type: Print (Hardcover & Paperback)
- Pages: 141
- ISBN: 81-237-0145-4

Folklore of Assam is a comprehensive book on Assamese folklore authored by Jogesh Das. The book was published by National Book Trust in 1972. The book is a part of the Folklore of India series. The book is originally written in English and then in other Indian languages.
