= Sameer Tanti =

Indian poet

- Born: 6 February 1955 (age 71); Karbi Anglong, Assam, India
- Education: MA in English Literature
- Alma mater: Gauhati University
- Occupations: poet, translator, editor
- Spouse: Liliban Kolkita (m. 1980)
- Writing career
- Language: Assamese
- Period: 21st century
- Genres: Poetry
- Notable work: Kadam Phular Raati
- Notable awards: Assam Valley Literary Award (2012); Gangadhar National Award For Poetry (2020); Sahitya Akademi Award (2024)

Sameer Tanti (born 6 February 1955) is an Assamese language poet, storyteller, translator, painter and social worker from India. He is the 2012 winner of the Assam Valley Literary Award. TantI was born in Bihora tea estate, Golaghat. In 2024, he won the Sahitya Akademi Award for his book of poems “Foringbure Bator Kotha Jane”.

== Biography ==
Sameer Tant was born on 6 February 1955 at Behora, Mikirchang tea estate in the Karbi Anglong district of Assam, India. He studied at Bihora Mikirchang P primary school in Golaghat, higher secondary from Haflong Government College, graduation in English literature from Dergaon college and Master's degree in English from Gauhati University in 1983. He worked as a faculty member at Saraighat College before working as a translator with an English daily newspaper in Guwahati and then as a tourist information officer in the Department of Tourism, Government of Assam.

== Works ==
Sameer Tanti has written fourteen poetry books, four critical essays, and two translations of African and Japanese books. he has also edited two short story collections. In his works he strives to bridge the growing disparity among different sections of society. He has presented his poetry at several international forums like Indian Poetry Festival (1987), Asian Poetry Festival (1988) and World Poetry Festival (1989).

== Awards ==
- 2012: Assam Valley Literary Award
- 2016: Padmanath Vidyabinod Literary Award
- 2017: Ramanath Bhattacharya Foundation Literary Award
- 2019: Shortlisted for Sahitya Akademi Award for his book "Kayakolper Bela"
- 2024: Sahitya Akademi Award for the Book Foringbure Bator Kotha Jane

== Bibliography ==
- 1985: Yuddha Bhumir Kabitaa
- Shokakul Upatyaka
- Tej Andhaaror Nao
- Somoy, Sabda, Sapon
- 2001: Kadam Phular Raati
- 2012: Ananda Aru Bedonaar Baivab
- 2013: Bishad Sangeet
- 2021: Foringbure Bator Kotha Jane
