= Sandhya Bhraman =

Sandhya Bhraman (Evening Walk) is a short story collection by Bhabendra Nath Saikia. First published in 1998, it was the last collection of Saikia's short stories published in his lifetime.

== Contents ==
The stories included in the book are:

- "Sandhya Bhraman"
- "Tarulata"
- "Prabhat"
- "Mukhamukhi"
- "Khadyapran"
- "Pakhanda"
- "Aishwarya"
- "Rajbhog"
- "Grahak"
- "Debodut"
- "Upapatni"
- "Bilash"
- "Aranya"
- "Smarak"
- "Pathsala"
- "Sahayika"
- "Ranabhanga"
