= Pranavjyoti Deka =

Indian writer (1939–2024)

- Born: 21 July 1939; Calcutta, Bengal Province, British India
- Died: 6 April 2024 (aged 84); Guwahati, Assam, India
- Education: Cotton College; Gauhati University; Banaras Hindu University; Leningrad Mining Institute
- Writing career
- Language: Assamese
- Notable works: Jyoti Bilingual Dictionary; Bewaris Las Aru Onyo Galpa; Xunor Samus Mukhot Loi
- Notable awards: Sahitya Akademi Award, 2023

Pranavjyoti Deka (21 July 1939 – 6 April 2024) was an Indian short story writer, novelist, researcher, lexicographer, geologist and professor from Assam.

Deka retired as a professor from the Department of Geology of Gauhati University. His autobiography, 'Xunor Samus Mukhot Loi' (With a Golden Spoon in Mouth), received praise from scholars after its publication. Jyoti Bilingual Dictionary is a notable literary work of him. In 2023, he received the Sahitya Akademi Award for his collection of short stories entitled 'Dr. Pranavjyoti Dekar Srestha Galpa' (Best Stories of Dr. Pranabjyoti Deka).

== Early life and education ==
Pranavjyoti Deka was born on 21 July 1939 in Calcutta. His father, Haliram Deka, was the first Assamese chief justice of the Gauhati High Court and his mother was Vidyavati Deka. In 1955, he passed his Entrance Examination from Don Bosco High School, Guwahati. He joined Cotton College and passed IA from here in 1957. He graduated with honors in mineral geology from the Gauhati University in 1959. After that he obtained Masters in Geology from Banaras Hindu University in 1961.

Deka later received his PhD in economic geology from the Leningrad Mining Institute, which is now known as Saint Petersburg Mining University.

== Career ==
After receiving his postgraduate degree, Deka began his career as a geologist at the Oil and Natural Gas Corporation in Sivasagar. He later received a scholarship from the Government of India and completed his PhD from the Leningrad Mining Institute (now Saint Petersburg Mining University). He joined the Department of Geology at the Gauhati University in 1999 and later retired as a professor in that department.

Deka wrote from his student days, and his writing style created a new chapter in Assamese fiction at the beginning of the post-Ramdhenu Era. In 2013, when Nitya Bora, editor of Assamese Pratidin, asked for a story for publication in the Sharadiya issue, Deka gave Bora the chapter on his sexual life experiences and criticized him for not publishing the chapter.

Deka served as the Economic Advisor to the Government of Manipur.

== Death ==
Pranavjyoti Deka died on 6 April 2024, at the age of 84, while undergoing treatment at Gauhati Medical College and Hospital (GMCH).

== Awards ==
- Assam Prakashan Parishad Literature Award, 2022
- Sahitya Akademi Award, 2023
- Kusumanjali Sahitya Samman, 2018, awarded by Kusumanjali Foundation, New Delhi
