= Nalinidhar Bhattacharya =

Indian poet and literary critic (1921–2016)

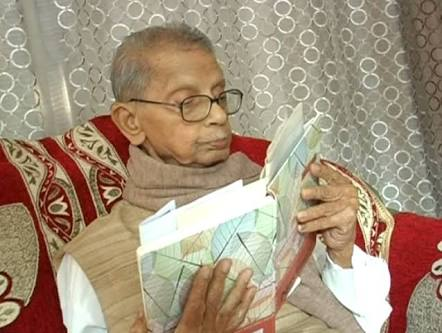
- Born: 4 December 1921; Jorhat, Assam
- Died: 1 September 2016 (aged 94)
- Occupation: Poet, writer, professor
- Awards: Sahitya Akademi Award (2002) Assam Valley Literary Award (2006)

Nalinidhar Bhattacharya (4 December 1921 – 1 September 2016) was an Indian poet and literary critic from Assam. He won the Sahitya Akademi Award for his collection Mahat Oitijhya in 2002.

His younger brother Birendra Kumar Bhattacharya was also a writer, and a Sahitya Academy award and Jnanpith Award recipient.

== Literary works ==
His published works include Serasalir Malita, Noni Asane Gharat, Mohot Aitaijya, etc.

== Awards ==
- Soviet Land Nehru Award (1983)
- Mrinalini Devi Award
- Sahitya Akademi award (2002)
- Indian Language Parishad award
- Chagganlal Jain award
- Assam Valley Literary Award (2006) etc.
- Sahityacharya honour by the Asam Sahitya Sabha (2010)
- ‘Papari Kabi’ Ganesh Gogoi award

== See also ==
- List of Assamese-language poets
- List of Sahitya Akademi Award winners for Assamese
- Assamese literature
