= Jogesh Das =

Indian writer and novelist

- Born: 1 April 1927; North Lakhimpur, Assam
- Died: November 9, 1999 (aged 72)
- Citizenship: Indian
- Education: Gauhati University
- Occupations: Writer, Journalist, Lecturer
- Writing career
- Language: Assamese
- Period: 1953 - present
- Genre: Fiction
- Notable works: Prithivir Axukh; Daawor Aru Nai
- Notable awards: 1980: Sahitya Akademi Award; 1994: Assam Valley Literary Award

Jogesh Das (1 April 1927 – 9 September 1999) was an Indian short-story writer and novelist from Assam. He was born in 1927. He won the Sahitya Akademi Award for his book Prithivir Oxukh. He was also associated with many cultural organization including the Asom Sahitya Sabha.

== Career ==
Das completed his M.A in Assamese literature from Gauhati University in 1953 and then started working as a journalist.Das became the first Sonowal Kachari to be elected as the president of the Asom Sahitya Sabha.

=== As a writer ===
Das emerged as a fiction writer in the early fifties. He has written short stories and novels with equal distinction. His first novel Kolpotuwar Mrityu was published in 1953. His second novel Daawor aru nai published in the year 1955 established him as an influential novelist. The book has been translated into numerous other Indian languages by the National Book Trust. His short-story collection Prithivir Oxukh brought him the prestigious Sahitya Akademi Award. His "Folklore of Assam" which was originally written in English and later translated into other Indian languages, is a simple and comprehensive book on Assamese folklore.

== Literary works ==
Some of his notable works are:

=== Novels ===
- 1953: Kolpotuwar Mrityu (Death of Kolpotuwa)
- 1955: Daawor aaru naai (No more cloud is there)
- 1959: Jonakir Jui (Flame of the Firefly)
- 1963: Nirupai-Nirupai (Helpless... Helpless)
- 1965: Emuthi Dhuli (A Handful of Dust)
- 1967: Haazaar Phul (Thousands of Flowers)
- 1972: Nedekha Juir Dhowa (Smoke of an unseen fire)
- 1972: Obidha (Illegitimate)
- 1977: Naresh Maloti Aru (Naresh, Maloti and...)

=== Story books ===
- 1956: Popiya Tora (Falling Star)
- 1958: Andharor Are Are (Under the Shadow of Darkness)
- 1961: Triveni (Confluence of Three)
- 1963: Modaror Bedona (Grief of the Sunshine Tree)
- 1965: Haazaar Lokor Bhir (A crowd of thousands)

=== English books ===
- 1972: Folklore of Assam

== Awards ==
- In 1980, Das received the prestigious Sahitya Akademi Award for his collection of short stories Prithivir Oxukh.
- In 1994 Das received the Assam Valley Literary Award for his contribution to Assamese literature.

== See also ==
- Sahitya Akademi Award to Assamese Writers
