= Imran Shah (writer) =

Indian Assamese language writer, poet, novelist, and scholar

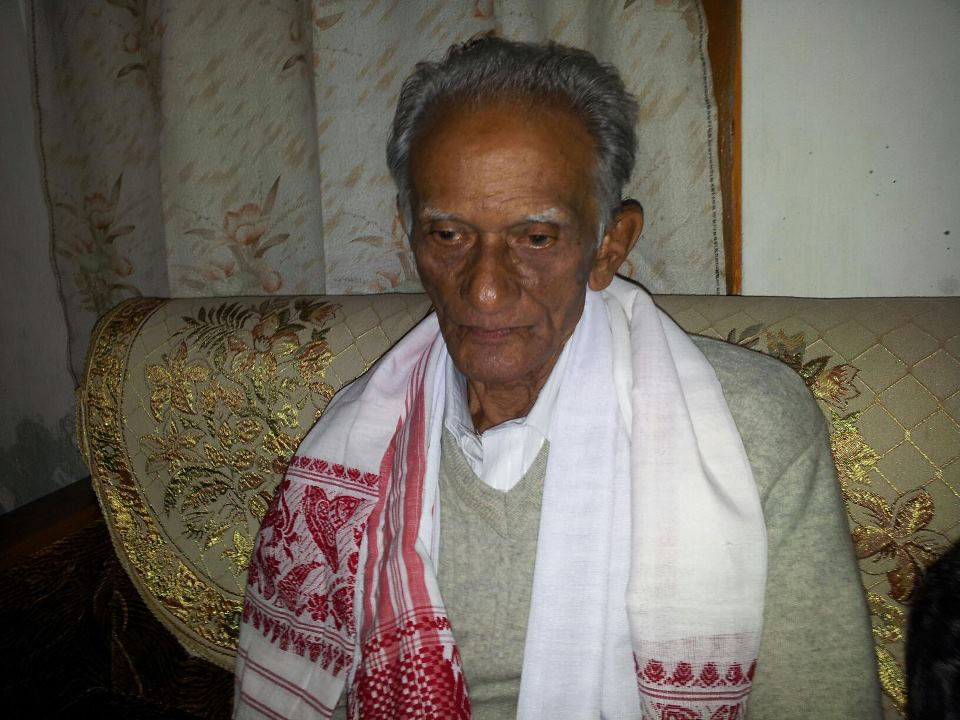
- Born: 23 November 1933 (age 92); Dhai Ali, Sivasagar, Assam
- Education: M.A (Assamese)
- Alma mater: Sibsagar College, Gauhati University
- Occupations: Professor, writer, and editor
- Spouse: Late Shahida Shah
- Children: 2
- Writing career
- Genres: Novelist, short story writer, poet
- Notable awards: Assam Valley Literary Award, Padma Shri

Imran Shah (born 23 November 1933), also known as Nawab Imran Shah, is an Indian Assamese language writer, poet, novelist, and scholar. He also writes under the pen names Ishan Dutta, Anamika Baruah, Kumbhakarna, and Animesh Baruah. The Government of India awarded him the fourth highest civilian honour of the Padma Shri, in 2021, for his contributions to literature and education.

== Early life ==
Imran Shah was born on 23 November 1933 in Sivasagar, Assam. He was the youngest child of Muhammad Shah and Mariam Nessa.

Shah attended '2 No. Dhai Ali Prathamik Vidyalaya' (No. 2 Dhai Ali Primary School), followed by attendance at the Government High School, Sivasagar. In 1952, he enrolled in the ISC course at Cotton College, Guwahati, and in 1958, he was awarded a Bachelor of Arts degree from Sivasagar College. He earned his M.A in Assamese language from Gauhati University.

== Professional background ==
=== Teaching career ===
Shah started his professional career as a temporary teacher at Konwarpur High School, Sivasagar and later joined the staff at Sivasagar High Madrassa School, after completing his ISC. Upon gaining his M.A. degree from Gauhati University he joined Gargaon College as a lecturer in Assamese in 1962. From there he moved a year later to become a lecturer in Assamese at Sivasagar College, from which he retired as Head of the Department in 1993. During his retirement, he established Arunudoi College, a junior college near his home and served as its principal.

=== Writing and editing career ===
Shah began writing while still in school. His first book of poems Banvashi was published when he was in the ninth standard. The following year, when he was in the tenth standard, his first novel, Sangeetor Hkhipare was published. He wrote poetry in Ramdhenu under the pen name Ishan Dutta. His first short story, "Aparicheeta" was published in 1958, in Natun Asomiya and edited by Kirtinath Hazarika.

He edited Bosoror Galpa, an anthology of selected Assamese short stories, from 1982 to 1984, as well as editing, with Arun Goswami, Kalantarar Kathakata – another anthology of Assamese short stories, from 1961 to 1975.

Two of his written works were made translated into other mediums. His novel Jabanbandi was broadcast as a radio-recitation by Akaashvani, Dibrugarh. In addition, the Assamese film Rasmirekha, is based on his novel, Rajanigandha, and was released in 1973, produced by Prafulla Baruah.

He was elected as the president of Asam Sahitya Sabha, the state's literary body located in Barpeta Road for the 2013-2015 session.

== Published works ==
- Banavashi (Book of Poems)
- Sangeetor Hkhipaare (Novel)
- Aparicheeta
- Kranti Rekha (Novel)
- Bondho Duwar (Novel)
- Kreetodasor hahi (Translated novel)
- Jabanbandi (Novel)
- Mur Phulanir Phool (Prose collection)
- Asomiya Sangskritiloi Musalmanor Avadaan (Lecture)
- Dhou Bhangi Dhou
- Nisanga Dhusar (Book of Poems)
- 'Kukuhaa (2012)' (latest short story collection)
- Ishan Duttar Nirbachito Kavita (Book of Poems)
- Shikhar Minoti
- Sagarikaa Novel)
- Barnali (Novel)
- Kavi Pulish (Novel)
- Banjyotshna (Novel)
- Tansen (Novel)
- Tathapi Sagar (Novel)
- Inkilaab (Translated Novel)
- Junakor Chobi (Translated Novel)
- Bosoror Galpa (1962, 1963, 1964) (Editor)
- Kalantoror Kothokotha (Editor)
- Vishwa Bandhu (Biography)
- Bandi Bihonggome Kaande
- Patheek
- Ityaadi
- Piyamukh Chanda
- Poora Maatir Malita
- Sparsharekha
- Imran Shahor Nirbachito Galpa
- Xoru Xoru Kotha (2013) *collection of articles*

== Honors and awards ==
- Assam Valley Literary Award, 2010
- Ajan Peer Bota by Government of Assam
- President of Asam Sahitya Sabha (2013)
- Padma Shri, 2021
