= Debraj Roy College =

College in Assam

Debraj Roy College, Golaghat
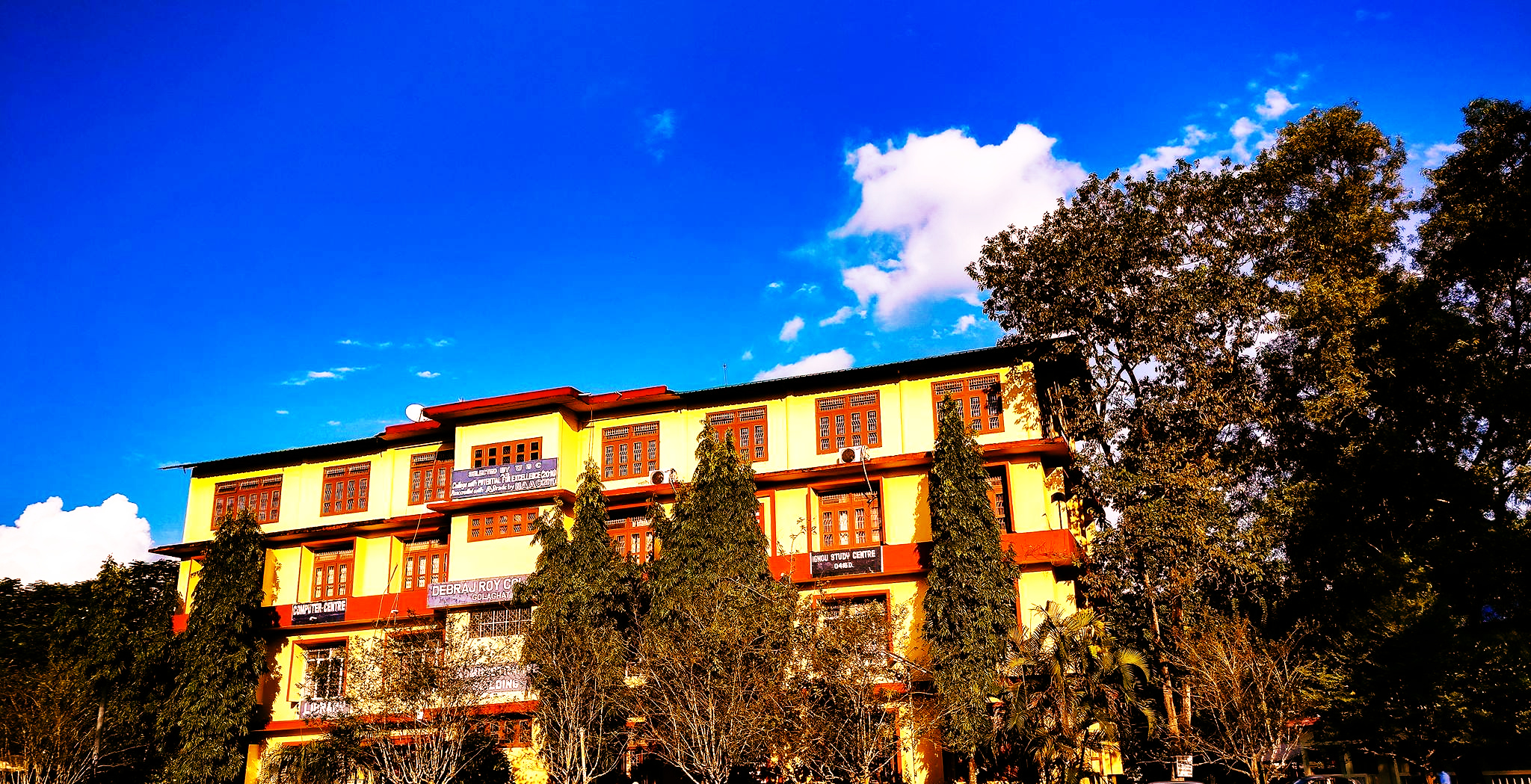
- Façade of the administrative block of D.R.
- Motto: Education gives Humility
- Type: Public
- Established: 1949; 77 years ago
- Affiliations: Primary: Dibrugarh University; Others: •Indira Gandhi National Open University (IGNOU) •National Assessment and Accreditation Council (NAAC) •Krishnakanta Handique State Open University (KKHSOU) •University Grants Commission (India) – UGC •Assam College Teachers' Association (ACTA)
- Principal: Dr. Jayanta Barukial
- Academic staff: 60+
- Students: 2500+
- Location: Circuit House Road, Golaghat, India
- Campus: Urban
- Colours: White & Navy blue
- Website: Official website

Debraj Roy College (informally known as D. R. College) is an autonomous college and a leading public institution of higher education established in 1949 at Jonaki Nagar in Golaghat. Affiliated to Dibrugarh University, the college has 15 departments running Higher Secondary and Undergraduate programmes both in Science and Arts. The college has a current enrollment of more than 2500 students. The college was ranked 4th among the colleges of Assam by Career360 in 2016.

== Academics ==
Besides higher secondary classes for both arts and science streams, the college offers option for studies at undergraduate level FYUGP in both arts and science streams. Post-graduate studies have been introduced in 10 departments of the college from the academic year 2024-25. The college also has the provision for Doctoral Research in Life Sciences under faculty research supervisors of the college under Dibrugarh University.

== Departments ==
There are 15 academic departments in the college which offer both major and core courses in science as well as arts streams. The academic departments of the college are:

Life Sciences (Postgraduate), English, Assamese, Political Science, History, Education, Economics, Philosophy, Chemistry, Physics, Mathematics, Zoology, Botany, Statistics, Biotechnology, and Computer Science.

== Recognition and accreditation ==
Debraj Roy College is recognised under 2f and 12b sections of the UGC Act 1956 and has been accredited with A grade by NAAC for its third cycle of assessment in 2023. It was also declared by UGC as a "College with Potential for Excellence" in the year 2010 and for a second term in 2014. The college was conferred Autonomous Status by the UGC on 24 April 2024.
