= Nirupama Borgohain =

Indian writer, journalist and novelist (born 1932)

- Born: 17 March 1932 (age 94); Guwahati, Assam, British India
- Education: Cotton College, Guwahati, Calcutta University
- Occupations: Journalist, novelist

Nirupama Borgohain (née Tamuli; born 17 March 1932) is an Indian Journalist and novelist in the Assamese language. She is a Sahitya Akademi award winner, best known for her novel Abhiyatri. In the year 2015, she decided to return her Sahitya Akademi award in protest against the rising intolerance in the society. She was a recipient of the Assam Valley Literary Award.

== Biography ==
Nirupama Tamuli was born in Guwahati, Assam on 17 March 1932, to Jadab Tamuli, a clerk in the Income Tax office, and Kashiswari Tamuli. She attended Cotton College, Guwahati and Calcutta University, from where she received post-graduate degrees in English literature and Assamese.

In 1958, Tamuli married the writer and journalist Homen Borgohain. They had two sons. In 1977, they separated.

== Career ==
=== Journalism ===
Borgohain worked as a lecturer of English at various colleges, as well as editor of Saptahik Sanchipat and Chitrangada.

Between 1968 and 1980, Borgohain worked at the weekly magazine Saptahik Neelachal, which she was responsible for developing into one of the most influential in Assam. From 1979–85, there was a socio-political movement in Assam against the influx of alleged illegal immigrants from Bangladesh, and several camps were attacked by the activists. Borgohain's investigation into these attacks resulted in essays that led to her controversial sacking from the magazine.

=== Literary ===
Borgohain began publishing short stories under the pseudonym Neelima Devi in the journal Ramdhenu. Some of her works are Anek Akas (Many Skies, 1961), Jalachabi (Movie, 1966), Sunyatar Kavya (Poems of Emptiness, 1969).

Borgohain's first novel Sei Nadi Niravadhi (The River Keeps Flowing) was published in 1963. This intertwined the story of a woman with the fate of a river, while Ejan Budha Manuh (An Old Man, 1966) centred on the relationship between a father and son, laying bare the tensions fraying it owing to an inter-caste marriage.

Her feminist novels Dinor Pisot Dinor (1968), Anya Jivan (1986) and Champavati were noted for their sympathetic portrayals of women facing up to oppressive social mores and the patriarchy. Meanwhile, the degradation faced by the indigent, owing to rural migration as well as the breakdown of the old established social orders, was acutely described in her Dinor Pisot Dinor as well as Bhabhishat Rongat Surya (1980). Iparor Ghor Siparor Ghor (Houses of This Side and That, 1979) again depicted the migration of rural folks to urban areas in search of a better life; the tale was told in a naturalistic form, realistic but suffused with pessimism.

Borgohain's Abhiyatri (1995) was a biographical novel of the life of an Assamese freedom fighter, feminist and social activist, Chandraprava Saikiani. This won her the Sahitya Akademi literary award the following year, and is considered one of her finest novels.

== Selected works ==
=== Novels ===
- Aei Nodi Niravadhi (1963) ISBN 978-81-86384-94-7
- Dinor Pisot Din (1968) ISBN 978-8126006885
- Antah Shrota (1969)
- Hridoy Eta Nirjon Dweep (1970)
- Samanya Asamanya (1971)
- Cactus Phul (1976)
- Iparor Ghor Siparor Ghor (1979)
- Bhabishyot Ronga Surjya (1980)
- Anya Jibon (1986)
- Champabati (1990)
- Abhiyatri. Sahitya Akademi. 1995. ISBN 978-8126006885.
- Barasun (2011)

=== Short stories ===
- Selected Short Stories Of Nirupama Borgohain. Guwahati: Spectrum. 2004. ISBN 978-8187502722.

=== Autobiography ===
- Vishwas Aru Sanshayar Majedi

== Awards and recognition ==
Borgohain has received numerous accolades for her literary achievements.

- Asam Sahitya Sabha's Hem Baruah Award, 1983
- Asam Sahitya Sabha's Basanti Devi Award, 1988
- Sahitya Akademi Award, 1996
- Assam Valley Literary Award, 2004
- Asam Sahitya Sabha's Prajnaratna, 2012

== Bibliography ==
- Deka, Meeta (2013). Women's Agency and Social Change: Assam and Beyond. SAGE. ISBN 978-81-321-1654-7.
- Gogoi, Ditimoni (2003). "Fair and Fearless:A profile of Nirupama Borgohain". The Sentinel. Archived from the original on 4 February 2016.
- Naikar, Basavaraj (2005). Literary Vision. Sarup & Sons. ISBN 978-81-7625-566-0.
- Natarajan, Nalini; Nelson, Emmanuel Sampath (1996). Handbook of Twentieth-century Literatures of India. Greenwood. ISBN 978-0-313-28778-7.
- Rajan, P. K. (1 January 1989). The Growth of the Novel in India, 1950-1980. Abhinav Publications. ISBN 978-81-7017-259-8.
- "Award conferred on Nirupama Bargohain". The Assam Tribune. 17 December 2012. Archived from the original on 26 November 2020.
- "Nirupama wins award - Silpi prize for Benu Misra". The Telegraph. 31 December 2003. Archived from the original on 29 May 2004.
- "Sabha plea to boost journal". The Telegraph. 25 December 2012. Archived from the original on 4 March 2016.
