= Nilmani Phookan Jr =

Indian Assamese-language writer (1933–2023)

Nilmani Phookan
- Born: 10 September 1933; Dergaon, Assam Province, British India
- Died: 19 January 2023 (aged 89); Guwahati, Assam, India
- Occupations: Poet, academic
- Known for: Symbolism

Nilmani Phookan (10 September 1933 – 19 January 2023) was an Indian poet in the Assamese language and an academic. His work, replete with symbolism, is inspired by French symbolism and is representative of the genre in Assamese poetry. His notable works include Surya Henu Nami Ahe Ei Nodiyedi, Gulapi Jamur Lagna, and Kobita.

Phookan has won the 56th Jnanpith Award, India's highest literary award, for the year 2020. He was also awarded the 1981 Sahitya Akademi Award in Assamese for his poetry collection, Kavita (Kobita). He was awarded the Padma Shri by Government of India in 1990, and received the Sahitya Akademi Fellowship, the highest literary honor in India, given by Sahitya Akademi, India's National Academy of Letters in 2002.

== Early life and education ==
Phookan was born in Dergaon in Golaghat district, Assam. He received his Master's degree in History from Gauhati University in 1961. Although he had started writing poetry in the early 1950s.

== Career ==
Phookan started his career as a lecturer at Arya Vidyapeeth College in Guwahati in 1964, where he worked until his retirement in 1992. He has also translated Japanese and European poetry into Assamese.

Phookan won the 56th Jnanpith Award, India's highest literary award, for the year 2020. He was also awarded the Assam Valley Literary Award in 1997, and in 2002 he received the Sahitya Akademi Fellowship, the highest literary honor in India, given by Sahitya Akademi, India's National Academy of Letters, reserved for "the immortals of literature". In 2019, he was awarded a D.Lit. by Dibrugarh University.

== Works ==
- Surya Heno Nami Ahe Ei Nadiyedi ("The sun is said to come descending by this river"), 1963.
- Manas-pratima. Guwahati Book Stall, 1971.
- Phuli Thaka Suryamukhi Phultor Phale ("Towards the Blooming Sunflower"), 1971.
- Kabita. Sahitya Akademi Publications, 2001. ISBN 81-260-1058-4.
- Silpakalar Upalabdhi aru Ananda: a book on art, aesthetics and visual perception. Anwesha Publication, 2013. ISBN 81-89003-64-X.
- Selected Poems Of Nilmani Phookan. tr. by Krishna Dulal Barua. Sahitya Akademi Publications, 2007. ISBN 81-260-2433-X.

== Awards and recognition ==
- In December 2021, the prolific poet and writer Nilmani Phookan received the prestigious Jnanpith Award for his lifetime contribution in literature.
- In 1997, Phookan was awarded the Assam Valley Literary Award.
- He was awarded the 1981 Sahitya Akademi Award in Assamese for his poetry collection, Kavita (Kobita)
- He was awarded the Padma Shri by Government of India in 1990.
- List of Indian poets
- Assamese literature
- History of Assamese literature
- List of Assamese-language poets
