= Keshada Mahanta =

Indian writer (1937–2018)

- কেশদা মহন্ত
- Born: November 17, 1939
- Died: March 26, 2018 (aged 78)
- Occupations: Author, writer
- Spouse: Bapchandra Mahant
- Writing career
- Language: Assamese
- Subject: History of Assamese literature
- Notable awards: Sahitya Akademi Award (2010)

Keshada Mahanta (17 September 1937 – 26 March 2018) was an Indian writer of Assamese literature. She was awarded a Sahitya Akademi Award in 2010 for her work Assamese Ramayani Sahitya: The Origin of Content.
