= Maramar Deuta =

Book by Bhabendra Nath Saikia

- Author: Bhabendra Nath Saikia
- Translator: Ashok Bhagawati (English edition)
- Language: Assamese
- Genre: Children's novel
- Publication place: India
- English publication date: 1998
- Media type: Print

Maramar Deuta is a children's novel written in Assamese by renowned Assamese author and film director Dr. Bhabendra Nath Saikia. It is about the bond between a child and his father. It was first published serially in several episodes in children's magazine Xophura, also then edited by Dr. Bhabendra Nath Saikia. Although the author said that the novel was especially meant for teenagers, it is popular among all age groups.

The novel was translated into English by Ashok Bhagawati and published by National Book Trust of New Delhi in 1998. The name of the English version is Dear Father.
