= Bhaben Barua =

Indian Assamese poet (born 1939)

- Born: 16 February 1939; Janji, Jorhat, Assam, British India
- Education: Scottish Church College, University of Delhi
- Alma mater: University of Delhi
- Occupations: Poet, writer, professor
- Writing career
- Language: Assamese; English
- Genres: Poetry; literary criticism; philosophy; history
- Notable works: Sonali Jahaj, Language and the National Question in Northeast India
- Notable awards: Sahitya Akademi Award (1979); Assam Publication Board Literary Award (1978); Padmanath Vidyabinod Memorial Literary Award (2014)

Bhaben Barua (born 1939) is an Assamese poet.

== Early life and education ==
Barua was born 16 February 1939 at Janji, in the Jorhat sub-division of the Sibsagar district.

He attended Boragaon Village Primary School (Janji) for four years (1944 to 1947), and Bamunpukhuri High School (Janji)(1948 to 1951). He passed the M. E. Standards in the First Division from the Jorhat Sub-division. He studied at Cotton Collegiate School (Guwahati) from 1952 to 1956 and passed in 1956 the Matriculation Examination in the first division with a merit scholarship. From 1958 to 1960 he studied art at Jagannath Barooah College (Jorhat) on a merit scholarship. He got his BA in English from the Scottish Church College in Calcutta in 1960. Starting in 1961 he studied for his MA in English literature at Delhi University, and graduated in 1963.

== Career ==
He worked for a year as a high school teacher, and then as a news reader for All India Radio, Delhi (1961–1963). He became a lecturer in English literature at the Punjabi University of Patiala in 1963, and joined the Gauhati University in 1964, whence he retired as Professor of English in 2003. From 1998 to 2000 he was a fellow at the Indian Institute of Advanced Study.

== Publications ==
(i) Poetry (in Axomiya) (ii) Literary Criticism (in Axomiya as well as English) (iii) Philosophy (in Axomiya as well as English) (iv) History (in Axomiya as well as English) (v) Many Lectures on English Language, English Literature and American Literature in the post-Graduate Department of Gauhati University (1964–2003). (vi) Editor of (a) Sanglap (in Axomiya), (b) Assam Quarterly (In English), (c) Assam Academy Review (In English), (d) Journal of the University of Gauhati : Arts (in English) (Maheswar Neog and Bhaben Barua jointly edited the two volumes of this journal), (e) Sudarshan (in English), (f) Natun Parjyayar Sanglap (in Axomiya) (vii) Organizations : (1) Muktadhara, (2) Axom Darshan Sangstha, (3) Sudarshan (2001), (4) Pragjyotish Foundation (2009)

== Awards ==
- Assam Publication Board Literary Award, 1978 - for the book of poems "Sonali Jahaj".
- Sahitya Akademi Award, 1979 - for "Sonali Jahaj" (the first book of the post-second world war Modern Axomiya Poetry to receive this award)
- 5th Padmanath Vidyabinod Memorial Literary Award (2014)

== Bibliography ==
(Natun Prithivi (in Assamese), published when he was studying in class VIII) (i) Sonali Jahaj (in Assamese) (ii) Pondharata Kabita (in Assamese) (iii) Baga Jui Kola Jui Aru Anyanya Kabita (in Assamese) (iv) Axomiya Kabita : Rupantarar Parba (in Assamese) (v) Axomiya Kabita : Bivartanar Parba (in Assamese) (vi) Prasanga : Kabita (in Assamese) (vii) Prasanga : Banikanta (in Assamese) (viii) Prasanga : Jyotiprasad (in Assamese) (ix) Prasanga : Bhabendranath (in Assamese) (x) Axomor Bouddhik Duravasthar Prasangat (in Assamese) (xi) Language and the National Question in Northeast India (in English) (xii) Science, Poetry and Politics (in English)
