= Dibru College =

College in Assam

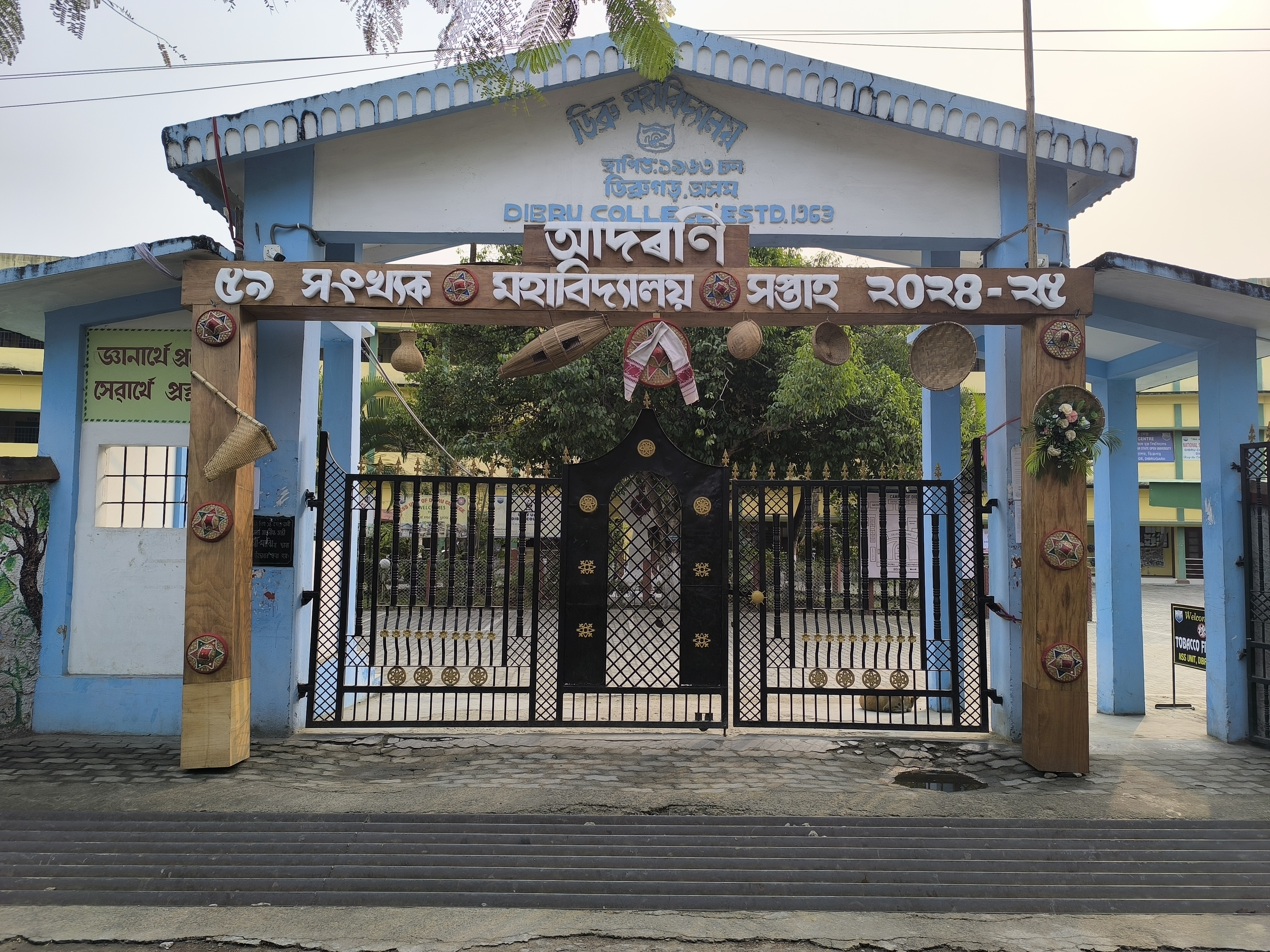
- Type: Public
- Established: 1963
- Affiliations: Dibrugarh University
- Principal: Dr. Ranjan Changmai
- Location: Boiragimoth, Assam, India
- Campus: Urban
- Website: dibrucollege.edu.in

Dibru College is an academic institution in Boiragimoth, in the middle of the city of Dibrugarh in the Indian state of Assam. The college provides courses in twelve subjects.

The college has received grants from the Indian Department of Science and Technology and the Government of Assam. In 2011, the Government of India sponsored the creation of a Department of Biotechnology there.

== Campus ==
The campus occupies 1.98 acres, including a library, gymnasium, cafeteria, daycare centre, and student union office.

The library was established in 1963, the same year as the college. The library is a two story building with a floor space of 595 square feet; it contains 44,375 print books, in addition to 19,500 e-books, 12 print journals, 6,200 e-journals, 21 magazines and 12 newspapers in English, Hindi, and Assamese. It also provides remote access and document delivery services to the local population.

In March 2026, a new administrative complex, Laxmi Narayan Kanoi Administrative Bhawan, was inaugurated.

== Academics ==
The college includes three faculties: Arts, Science, and Commerce. It offers the two year "Higher Secondary Course" and three year "Degree Course of Study".

== Educational departments ==
- English Department
- Assamese Department
- Bengali Department
- Sanskrit Department
- Education Department
- Economics Department
- Commerce Department
- History Department
- Political Science Department
- Anthropology Department
- Sociology Department
- Geology Department
- Philosophy Department
- Hindi Department
- Mathematics Department
- Botany Department
- Zoology Department
- Chemistry Department
- Physics Department
- Computer Science Department
- Biotechnology Department
- Statistical Science Department
