= Srinkhal =

Short stories by Bhabendra Nath Saikia

Srinkhal (Assamese: শৃংখল) is a collection of short stories in the Assamese language written by Bhabendra Nath Saikia. The author received the Sahitya Akademi award for the collection in 1976.

The book contains 14 stories:

1. Srinkhal [chain]
2. Suryoday [sunrise]
3. Chowkidar [watchman]
4. Kritagya [grateful]
5. Banaprastha [leaving the family]
6. Durbhikho [famine]
7. Balibhoj [picnic]
8. Bandar [port]
9. Pradhokshin [rotation]
10. Akash [sky]
11. Chariali [crossroads]
12. Khabar [news]
13. Barnana [Barnana: a woman's name]
14. Raktim [blood-stained]
