= Dear Mom (Glenn Miller song) =

1941 World War II song

"Dear Mom" was a 1941 World War II song with words and music by Maury Coleman Harris released by Republic Music Corp. The song was inspired by the 1940 Selective Service Act. The original recording was by Sammy Kaye and his Orchestra, with vocals by Allan Foster from the Victor Records stable. This was overshadowed by a recording in 1942 by Glenn Miller.

The lyrics take the form of a "Dear Mom.." letter from a serviceman:

The weather today is cloudy and damp Your package arrived but was missing a stamp Your cake made a hit with all the boys in the camp How they loved it.

== Bronco song ==
A version of the song with changed lyrics later became current as the "Dear Mom" Bronco song, after the OV-10 Bronco, among US pilots in the Vietnam War. Retaining the "Dear Mom" letter beginning the author changes from the son, to "Dear Ma'am," from a fellow pilot informing her of the death of her son in action:

Dear mom (or ma'am), your son is dead, he bought the farm today; He crashed his OV-I0 on Ho Chi Minh's Highway; It was a rocket pass and he busted his ass. Hmmm. Hmmm. Hmmm. He went across the fence to see what he could see. There it was, as plain as it could be. It was a truck on the road with a big heavy load. Hmmm. Hmmm. Hmmm.
