= Apurba Kumar Saikia =

Indian writer

- Born: 21 October 1962 (age 63); Diphalu Satra, Nagaon, Assam
- Occupations: Chief Medical Officer [NFSG], [ESIC], Under Labour and Employment Department, Government of India
- Spouse: Mrs Nilakshi Changkakati Saikia
- Children: Miss Arhana Purba Saikia (daughter); Mr Ayanabh Saikia (son)
- Parent(s): Mr. Purnadhar Saikia; Mrs. Phulmai Saikia
- Writing career
- Years active: 1998–present
- Notable awards: Sahitya Akademi Award

Apurba Kumar Saikia is an Indian writer from Assam. He was the recipient of the Sahitya Akademi Award (2020).

== Early life and education ==
Saikia was born in Diphalu Satra, Nagaon to parents Mr. Purnadhar Saikia and Mrs. Phulmai Saikia. He is an eye specialist and chief medical officer (Non-Functional Selection Grade) at the Employees' State Insurance Corporation (ESIC) Model Hospital, Khanapara, Assam.

== Bibliography ==
=== Story collections ===
- Bengsata
- Byortho Nayak
- Lingamukto Prithivir Xadhu Eta
- Chotor Urohi
- Bojarot Edin
- Bixoi: Premor Xangbidhan
- Maati Akhora
- Randhani Beli
- Manar Daaktor

=== Article collections ===
- Asomiya Manuhor Gene

=== Translated short story collections ===
- Deshi-Bideshi Galpa Sambhar Editing [published by ASAM SAHITYA SABHA ]

== Awards ==
Saikia was awarded with Sahitya Akademi Award (2020) for his short stories collection Bengsata. Earlier significant Awards are : Jadav Sarma Literary Award, Literary Excellence Award by Indian Medical Association, Antarlipi Sahitya Bota, Kathasandhi Sanman by Sahitya Akademi, Ambikagiri Roychoudhury Award for the best book on creative writing [Chotor Urohi, Short Story Collection] by Asam Sahitya Sabha.
