= Homen Borgohain =

Indian writer (1932–2021)

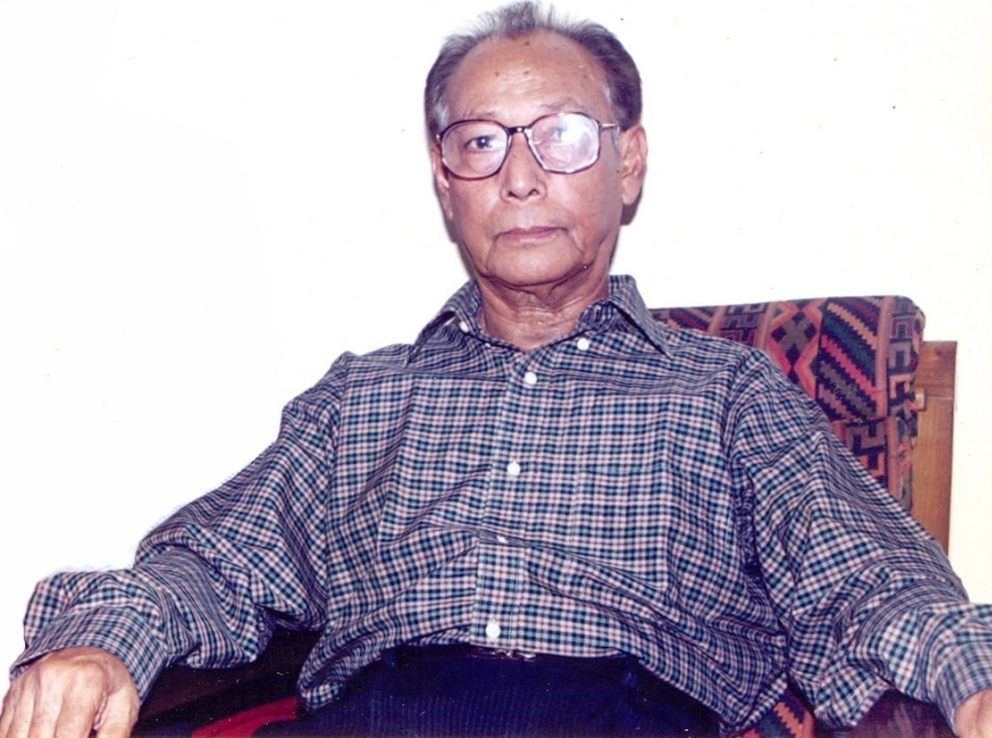
- Born: 7 December 1932; Dhakuakhana, Assam Province, British Raj
- Died: 12 May 2021 (aged 88); Guwahati, Assam, India
- Occupations: Civil Servant, Author, Journalist, Poet, Editor.
- Writing career
- Genre: Assamese literature
- Notable works: Pita-Putra, Atmanusandhan, Matsyagandha, Dhumuha aru Ramdhenu, 'সাউদৰ পুতেকে নাও মেলি যায় (Xaudor puteke nau maeli jaai)
- Website: Official Website

Homen Borgohain (7 December 1932 – 12 May 2021) was an Assamese author and journalist. He was awarded the 1978 Sahitya Akademi Award in Assamese language for his novel Pita Putra. He was also the President of Assam Sahitya Sabha from 2001 to 2002.

Despite his rural upbringing, Borgohain also addressed issues of urban life in his writing. In the early phase of his life Borgohain led an almost bohemian existence and the reflection of that particular life can be visualised in many of his early stories. He later became editor for a variety of publications. He also wrote several novels, short stories, and poems.

== Life ==
Born in a small village in Dhakuakhana, Lakhimpur, Borgohain went to Guwahati after completing matriculation from Dibrugarh Govt. Boys' Higher Secondary School and joined Cotton College for higher studies. He married Nirupama Tamuli, famous in Assam as Nirupama Borgohain : one of the most popular writers of her generation and an exponent of early feminist writings in Assam. The writer couple wrote a novel called Puwar Purobi Sandhyar Bibhash, which is the first and perhaps the only joint-novel written in Assamese.

Borgohain first edited an Assamese weekly newspaper Nilachal and later he edited the weekly Nagarik. Afterwards, he served as a senior staff member of Bangali daily newspaper Ajkal. Borgohain's editorial articles in Nilachal and Nagarik are edited by Dr. R. Sabhapandit and published in two volumes in Assamese.

From 2003 to 2015, he was the editor in chief of Assamese daily Amar Asom; he then worked as the editor in chief of another daily Niyomiya Barta from 2015 until his death.

He returned his Sahitya Academy award in 2015 in protest against the lack of tolerance being created at the Indian society. He died on 12 May 2021 at the age of 88 due to complications from COVID-19.

== Literary works ==
=== Novels ===
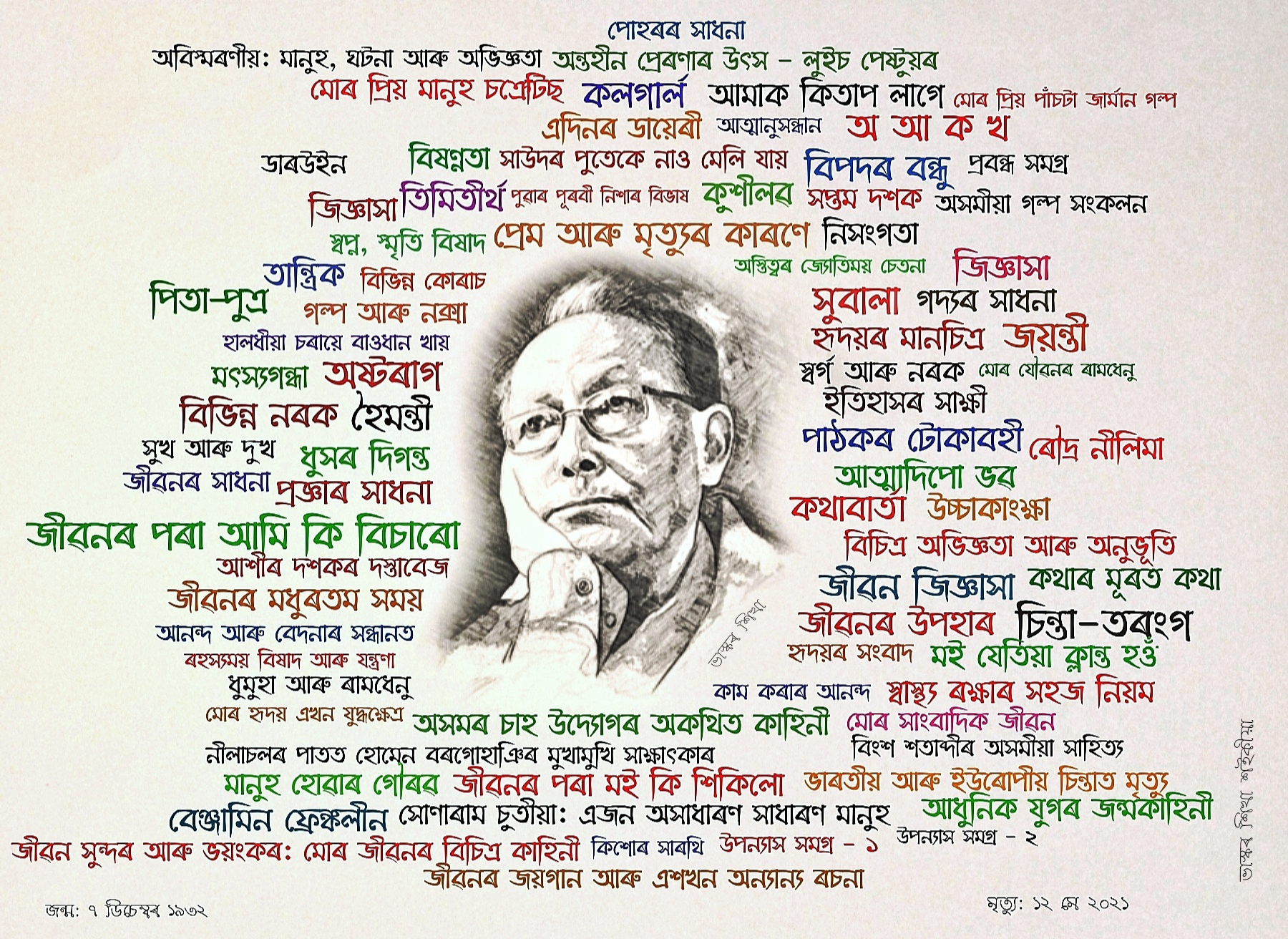
হোমেন বৰগোহাঞি দেৱৰ ৰচনাৱলী Location- Cotton University, Guwahati

- সাওদৰ পুতেকে নাও মেলি যায় (Xaudor Puteke Nau Meli Zay)
- হালধীয়া চৰায়ে বাও ধান খায় (Halodhiya Soraye Bau Dhan Khay)
- অস্তৰাগ (Ostorag)
- পিতা পুত্ৰ (Pita Putro)
- তিমিৰ তীৰ্থ (Timir Tirtha)
- কুশীলৱ (Kuxilow)
- এদিনৰ ডায়েৰি (Edinor Dayeri)
- বিষন্নতা (Bixonnota)
- নিসংগতা (Nixongota)
- সুবালা (Xubala)
- মৎস্যগন্ধা (Motsyogondha)

=== Autobiography ===
- আত্মানুসন্ধান (Atmanuxondhan)
- মোৰ সাংবাদিক জীৱন (Mur Xangbadik Ziwan)
- ধুমুহা আৰু ৰামধেনু (Dhumuha Aru Ramdhenu)
- মোৰ হৃদয় এখন যুদ্ধক্ষেত্ৰ (Mur Hridoy Ekhon Zudhyokhetro)

=== Non-fiction ===
- গদ্যৰ সাধনা (Godyor Xadhona)
- মানুহ হোৱাৰ গৌৰৱ (Manuh Huwar Gourow)
- প্ৰজ্ঞাৰ সাধনা (Progyar Xadhona)
- উচ্চাকাংক্ষা (Ussakangkhya)

== Editor of newspapers and magazines ==
1. Aamar Asom
2. Axom Bani
3. Nilachal
4. Xutradhar
5. Nagorik
6. Xatxori
7. Niyomia Barta

== Awards ==
- Sahitya Akademi Award
- Assam Valley Literary Award
- Nilamoni Phukan Award from Asom Sahitya Sabha
- Srimanta Sankardev Award
- Matshendra Nath Award

== See also ==
- List of Indian poets
- Assamese literature
- List of Assamese writers with their pen names
- History of Assamese literature
- [[List of Assamese-language
- List of people from Assam poets]]
