= Safura =

Safura is a given name. Notable people with the name include:

- Safura Alizadeh (born 1992), Azerbaijani singer
- Safura Begum (born 1959), Bangladeshi politician
