= Champavati =

Snake bridegroom folktale from Assam, India

Folk tale
- Name: Champavati
- Also known as: Champawati, Campāvatī, Champabati
- Aarne–Thompson grouping: AaTh 433C, "The Serpent Husband and The Jealous Girl"; ATU 433B, "King Lindworm"
- Region: Assam, India
- Related: The Story of the Hamadryad; The Origin of the Sirenia

Champavati (Note: Also spelled Champawati, Campāvatī or Champabati; Assamese: চম্পাৱতী, Assamese pronunciation: [sɔmpawɔti] or [sɔmpabɔti].) (Assamese: চম্পাৱতী, Assamese pronunciation: [sɔmpawɔti]) is an Assamese folk tale. It was first collected in the compilation of Assamese folklore titled Burhi Aair Sadhu, by poet Lakshminath Bezbaroa. According to Assamese scholars, the story is known in Assam and among Assamese people.

The tale is related to the international cycle of the Animal as Bridegroom, wherein a heroine marries a husband in animal form who reveals he is man underneath. In this case, the heroine marries a husband in animal shape that becomes human, while another girl marries a real animal and dies. Variants of the narrative are located in India and Southeast Asia, with few registered in the Brazilian and Arab/Middle Eastern folktale catalogues.

== Summary ==
According to Praphulladatta Goswami, there are at least three published versions of Champavati. In addition, the tale is considered to be an "enduring folk narrative" in Assam, being very popular among the Assamese people and known, for example, in different districts of Lower Assam and in North Lakhimpur.

=== Bezbaroa's variant ===
A man has two wives, one older (the man's favourite - Laagee) and one young (Aelaagee), and one daughter by each wife. The younger wife's daughter is named Champavati. One day, she goes to the rice fields and sings a song to shoo away the birds, but a voice answers her his desire to marry her. After she tells her mother about the event, Champavati's father agrees to marry her to whoever appears to them; so a snake comes to take the girl as his bride.

The snake and Champavati spend the night together, and the next morning she appears to her family decorated with jewels and golden ornaments. Her father and her step-mother, jealous of the girl's good luck, arrange a marriage between his other daughter and a snake he captures in the jungle. When the snake is placed with the girl, she complains to her mother - who is listening behind the door - that parts of her body are tickling, which the mother takes to mean that her snake husband is decorating her with bridal garments and jewels.

The next morning, they discover that the girl is dead. Their grief and rage are so great that they conspire to kill the Aelaagee (the younger wife) and Champavati, but the python devours both before they can do any harm to both women. The python then grabs his wife Champavati and her mother and takes them to a palace in the forest. They begin to live together. After her mother dies, Champavati is visited by a beggar woman who tells the girl her husband is a god underneath the snakeskin and urges her to burn the snakeskin, while he is away. Champavati heeds the beggar woman's words and does as she said, turning her husband into human definitively.

The same beggar woman returns another day and suggests Champavati to eat from her husband's plate. She decides to follow the suggestion and eats from his plate; she sees some villages inside his mouth and asks her husband to show her the world. He goes to the river and asks her if she wants him to show her the world in his mouth. She agrees. He goes to the middle of the river and opens up his mouth to show her the world. He tells her he will go away for six years, and gives her a ring to protect from any other demon that may want to devour her. He explains that his mother is a cannibal (a rakshasi, in the original; a type of demoness), and that he disobeyed his mother's wishes to see him married to a bride of her choice.

It happens as he predicts, but his ring protects Champavati. She seeks her husband after 6 years and finds him in his mother's house. Her mother-in-law gives her a letter to take to another demoness, with an order to kill Champavati. Her husband intercepts Champavati, takes the letter and kills his own mother to protect his human wife.

Mrinal Medhi suggests that Bezbaroa's version of Champavati is a combination of two "separate plots", the first part about the marriage between a human maiden and an animal paramour, and a second part where the heroine deals with the advances of her demoness mother-in-law.

=== Goswami's variant ===
Praphulladatta Goswami collected an homonymous tale from an informant named Srimati Jnanadasundari Barua, in North Lakhimpur. In this tale, also titled Champavati, a man has two wives, the elder his favourite, and a daughter by each wife, the younger one's named Champavati. One day, Champavati is sent to the rice fields to drive the quails away from the paddy. She sings a song, saying that she will give fried rice to the quails, when a voice replies to her song that they will marry Champavati. The girl comments about it to her mother and father, and is convinced to reply to the mysterious voice. She does and discovers the voice's owner: a serpent. Wanting to see her stepdaughter killed, her father's first wife says she must honor the promise, and locks the girl in her room with the snake.

The girl cries aloud she is feeling something on her body, and the stepmother thinks the girl is being devoured. However, Champavati exits the room with a smile and decorated with jewels on her body. Jealous of Champavati's luck, the elder wife orders her husband to find another serpent husband to her own daughter, hoping the girl can experience the same fate as her half-sister. After Champavati leaves with her husband, a serpent is brought and married to the girl, then it is locked in the same room with her. The serpent begins to swallow the girl piece by piece (feet, waist, breast and neck) and the girl complains about it, but her mother dismisses it as her son-in-law decorating her body. The next morning, the elder wife goes to check on her daughter and, finding only a bloated serpent, lets out an anguished cry.

Back to Champavati, she lives her days in happiness in the forest, but wishes her husband was not a serpent. One day, a beggar woman pays her a visit and explains the serpent is a god in disguise who takes off his snakeskin at night and goes out, so she can pretend to be asleep and burn it the next time he takes it off. Following the beggar woman's suggestion, Champavati does as instructed, takes the snakeskin and tosses it in the fire. The human snake husband rushes in and writhes in pain, feeling a burning sensation. Champavati quickly rubs oil and water on his body, then fans it, and he becomes a handsome man permanently.

=== Chandra Barua's variant ===
Author Sri Atul Chandra Barua published another version of Champavati in his work Sandhiyar Sadhu ("संधियार साधु"). In his version, titled হুৰ, হুৰ, বটা চৰাই ("Hur, Hur, bota chorai"; English: "Hur Hur, quail birds" or "Away, Away, Quails"), a man has a plantation and two wives, Lagi and Elagi, and one daughter of marriageable age by each. The Lagi wife's daughter is spared the more hard work, while the Elagi wife's daughter is ordered to look after the paddy fields and tie the cows in the barn. One day, Elagi's daughter goes to the paddy fields to shoo away the birds from the crops, singing verses to chase away the quail birds and asking them not to eat the rice. However, after she sings the verses, a voice comes from somewhere, uttering a distic in response, saying it will have the rice and the girl too. The girl sings in response to the verses, and a snake comes out of the forest.

The girl rushes back home and informs her parents about it. The man and his Lagi wife join the girl to investigate and she sings the same verses to draws the voice; the voice's response comes from the forest, and sings the same verses. The couple enter the forest to find the owner of the voice and find a python ("ajogor sap") that turns into a human person in front of them. The Lagi wife thinks to herself that, if her stepdaughter marries the python, the animal will surely devour her, which clears the way for her own daughter to inherit everything, so Lagi tells her husband the python disguise must be an illusion cast by the gods and they must not anger them, so they should speed up the girl's marriage. Elagi wife cries for her daughter's marriage to the animal, fearing it will devour her, but the man captures the animal and brings it home, then readies his daughter, marries her to the snake and places her in a room, while Elagi remains outside the door. At midnight, Elagi's daughter cries out for her mother that something is happening to her feet, then to her hands, then to her neck, until it falls silent. The following morning, Elagi fears her daughter is dead, but she comes out of the room safe and sound and wearing golden ornaments on her body. Surprised that her stepdaughter came out in such a way, Lagi convices her husband to find their daughter another python, which the man captures and brings home. Lagi's daughter goes to sleep in her room, when the large snake wakes up and begins to swallow her, starting with her feet. The girl complains to her mother that she is being devoured, first by the foot, and the woman simply dismisses it, as the animal continues to eat the girl whole. The following morning, the Lagi wife goes to check on her daughter and cannot find her, only the snake.

=== Taruni Devi's variant ===
In a variant collected from seventy-year-old teller Taruni Devi, from Kenduguri, Jorhat, with the title Champavati, a cultivator has two wives and two daughters, one of them called Champavati. The girl's stepmother withholds rice from her. She goes to scare away the quails from the paddy fields and sings a song about it, when a voice from the forest replies with their own verses saying they will marry Champavati. The girl reports the incident to her father, who goes with her to listen to the song and agrees to the voice's request. A large snake appears and takes Champavati with him. The teller explains the snake as the son of a deity cursed to snake form, removes the snakeskin and goes to Heaven. In their marital home, a beggar woman advises Champavati to burn the snakeskin while her husband is out, then she is to give him Bhimkal (a type of banana) and Karkara bhat (steamed rice). It happens thus and Champavati's husband is turned to human form. Meanwhile, her stepmother, desirous of having her own daughter experience the same luck as Champavati, finds a real snake in the forest which she marries to her daughter. The snake eats her.

== Analysis ==
=== Tale type ===
The tale is classified in the international Aarne-Thompson-Uther Index as AaTh 433C, "The Serpent Husband and The Jealous Girl", a subtype of type AaTh 433, "The Prince as Serpent". In this tale type, a girl marries a snake who gives her jewels and ornaments and becomes human after the burning of his snakeskin; another girl tries to imitate with a real snake, with disastrous and fatal results.

However, in his own revision of the folk type index, published in 2004, German folklorist Hans-Jörg Uther subsumed types AaTh 433 ("The Prince as Serpent"), AaTh 433A ("A Serpent Carries a Princess to Its Castle") and AaTh 433C under a new type: ATU 433B, "King Lindworm".

=== Motifs ===
Professor Stuart Blackburn stated that some Southeast Asian variants contain the motif of the fruit tree owned by the snake, whose fruits either the sisters or their mother want. More specifically, it is found in central Arunachal Pradesh, and among the Kucong and Nusu people of Yunnan.

Type 433C also contains the motif J2415.7, "A snake for the real daughter. Stepdaughter, married to a snake, appears decorated with jewels. Stepmother desires a snake be procured for her daughter. She is swallowed instead".

Although P. Goswami recognized some similarities of the tale with the Cinderella cycle (e.g., stepsisters, stepmother's persecution of heroine), the end of the tale links it to "the class of 'Beauty and the Beast'."

== Variants ==
=== Distribution ===
In his 1961 revision of the tale type index, American folklorist Stith Thompson indicated 5 variants of the type, found only in India. Praphulladata Goswami also located "variants" among the Garos and the Angami Nagas. Hence, Thompson and Warren Roberts's work Types of Indic Oral Tales links this tale type "exclusively" to South Asia.

In addition, according to professor Stuart Blackburn, this is the "Asian" version of the snake-husband story, and variants of the narrative (girl marries snake and is fortunate; jealous girl marries another snake and dies) are reported in India (in Nagaland and Assam), Southeast Asia, China, and among Tibeto-Burman speakers in central Arunachal Pradesh and the extended eastern Himalayas (e.g., the Apatani, Nyishi people, Tagin people, Garo people and Lisu people). Taiwanese scholarship also locates variants of subtype 433C in Cambodia and Indonesia.

=== India ===
==== The Snake and the Farmer's Daughter ====
Lakshiminath Bezbaroa collected another Assamese tale, titled "সাপ আৰু খেতিয়কৰ জীয়েক", and translated as The Snake and the Farmer's Daughter. In this tale, a farmer has two wives and a daughter by each wife. The man and his second wife (laagi) dislike the elder wife (elagee), and force her and her daughter to do the hard work around the house, like collecting dung and watching over the sugarcanes and rice fields. One day, the elder wife's daughter goes to work in the paddy fields and shoos away the birds, when she hears a voice in the forest telling the girl a snake will marry her. The girl reports the incident to her father, and both go near the forest: a python ("অজগৰ সাপ", "ajagor saap", in the original) appears and declares its intentions to marry the girl. The man consults with his wives: the second wife insists her stepdaughter is given to the python, since she hopes the animal devours the girl, while the elaagi wife cries for her daughter's possible fate. The following day, the man returns to talk to the python and invites the animal to marry his daughter. During the night, the python and the girl spend the night in a room, and she cries to her mother the snake is doing something to her body, first to her feet, then to her waist, to her hands, and lastly to her neck. The day after, the girl comes out of her room in decorated with golden ornaments, to her own mother's relief and the lagee's wife's surprise. The second wife wishes to repeat the experience with her own daughter and asks her husband to find another python and bring it home. It happens thus, and the second wife locks her own daughter in a room with the python. The animal slowly devours the girl during the night: she protests the animal is swallowing her, but the second wife thinks the python is providing her with jewels. The next morning, the lagee wife finds her daughter was swallowed by the snake. The tale has been described as having "similarities" to the first part of Bezbaroa's version of Champavati.

==== The Snake Prince (India) ====
In a tale collected by Sunity Devi, Maharani of Coochbehar, with the title The Snake Prince, a Maharajah is married to two Maharanis, an older one who is kind and gentle, and a younger one, of a striking appearance and who the Maharajah loves dearly. The younger Maharani becomes jealous of the older one, which worsens after the latter gives birth to a girl. The younger Maharani orders her husband to build a hut and to expel the older queen there. The older Maharani's daughter grows up in poverty. Years later, the girl goes to the jungle to gather firewood for fuel and hears a voice proposing to her. She pays no heed to the voice, but talks to her mother about it. The Maharani convinces her daughter to accept the voice's proposal the next morning. She goes to the jungle and consents to be the voice's bride, who answers he will come in five days' time to marry her. She consults with a pandit, who assures her that the fixed date is most auspicious for a wedding. The elder Maharani and her daughter invite the king, the younger Maharani and other to see the mysterious bridegroom. At midnight, two palki-bearers bring the bridegroom: a huge python. The python marries the Maharani's daughter and they enter the hut for their wedding night. The elder Maharani stays outside and hears her daughter complaining about her body aching. The Maharani thinks her daughter is being eaten by the snake, but the hut doors open and there she is, safe and sound. The girl explains that the python was decorating her body with heavy jewelry, that is why her body was aching. She also reveals that the python is no python, but a handsome youth who will return the next night to live with her. The younger Maharani, fuming at the older one's luck, orders her servants to find a python in the jungle so she can marry it to her own daughter. The younger Maharani locks her own daughter into the chambers with the python. Her daughter screams to be let out and that her body is aching, but the Maharani thinks the python is simply decorating her daughter's body. The next day, she finds that the python devoured her daughter, and the Maharajah expels her from the kingdom. Back to the older Maharani, she talks her daughter to burn the python prince's snakeskin, so he can be human at all times. The python prince's wife burns his snakeskin in a fire. He complains about it at first, but he eventually accepts it, and explains that he was cursed as a python until he married a princess.

==== Humility rewarded and Pride punished ====
In a Bengali tale published by Francis Bradley Bradley-Birt with the title Humility rewarded and Pride punished (alternatively, Sukhu and Dukhu), a weaver is married to two wives, each with a daughter. The elder wife and her daughter, named Shookhu, are idle, while the younger wife and her daughter, named Dukhu, work hard to maintain the house. After the weaver dies, the elder wife takes charge of the house and finances. Dukhu and her mother work by spinning cotton thread and selling coarse clothes at the bazaar. One day, while Dukhu is putting some cotton to dry out in the sun, a gust of wind blows it all over. The wind bids her to follow him. She goes and reaches a cowshed where a cow asks to be fed; further along, a plantain tree that asks to be relieved of it bushes; a horse that also asks to be fed. She fulfills their wishes and reaches the house of the moon's mother, who welcomes her and tells her to refresh herself at a nearby pool. Dukhu dips her head in the water and becomes even more beautiful. She enters the moon's mother's house and is told to choose one of the boxes full of cotton, but chooses only a small box. On her return, the horse, the plantain tree and the cow gift her a winged colt, a baskets of gold mohurs and a necklace, and a calf that produces milk. Dukhu returns with the small box and Shookhu's mother, seeing the step-daughter's fortune, orders her own daughter to make the same journey, hoping she will also be rewarded. That night, after Dukhu and her mother fall asleep, the small box opens up and a prince-like youth comes out of it. Shookhu's journey is unlike her step-sister's: she refuses to help the animals and the tree and mistreats the moon's mother. When she goes to the river to bathe, she dives three times and her body becomes covered with warts and boils. She goes home with the largest chest and the cow, the horse and the tree humiliate her. Shookhu's mother is frightened at the sight, but expects a better outcome with the large chest her daughter brought. That night, Shookhu cries out to her mother that her body is aching all over, but her mother dismisses her complaints, thinking it is another bridegroom that emerged from the chest that is decorating her body. The next morning, the mother enters Shookhu's room and sees only a pile of bones and a cast-off snakeskin beside it.

==== Tale of the Python (Odisha) ====
In an Orissan text titled ଅଜଗରସାପ କଥା ("Tale of the Python"), published by author Madhusudan Rao, a king has two wives and a daughter to each one, but he favours the younger one over the older one. He moves the older queen and her daughter to another house, where the latter goes to watch over the fields from the birds. Meanwhile, a prince, cursed into snake form, replies to the princess's words by asking her to tell her mother he will marry her, the princess. This goes on for some days, until the queen listens to the prince's words coming from the forest, and invites the voice to come to their door. The following morning, a python snake appears at their door, intent on marrying the princess. The elder queen and the princess realize the gravity of their situation, and cry for their decision. The king decides to go through with the wedding and marries his daughter and the python in a ceremony, then places then in the wedding chambers. The prince comes out of the python skin to meet his wife, and the princess burns the snakeskin. The prince's body burns, so she passes some sandalwood paste on his body. Both talk and the prince reveals the origin of his curse: in his childhood, he played with other friends and bumped into an old woman; annoyed, she cursed the prince to become a python, but he could return to normal by a woman who guards the fields and burns his skin - which has indeed happened. The following morning, the prince and the princess exit the room. The younger queen sights the prince and declares her daughter shall marry a snake: a second python is brought to her daughter, married to her, and placed in a room with the girl. However, at night, the snake devours the girl little by little, which she protests, but the younger queen thinks her prospective son-in-law is placing bridal ornaments on her daughter's body. The next morning, the queen notices her daughter's delay and opens the room, finding the snake's bloated body. The animal gives out a roar and slithers off, leaving the younger queen crying for her loss, as the elder queen celebrates her own daughter's happy marriage.

==== Tale of the Python (Mahipala) ====
In a Odishan tale from Mahipala ("ମହୀପାଳ", in the original) with the title ଅଜଗର କଥା ("Ajagar Katha"; English: "Tale of the Python"), a king has two wives, the elder queen with a single daughter and the younger one with two, called Olia Brajuli ("ଓଳିଆ ବ୍ରଜୂଳି") and Chaiya Brajuli ("ଚାଉଳ ବ୍ରଜୂଳି"). The younger queen dislikes the elder one, and banishes her and her daughter to a house near the rice fields. The exiled queen sends her daughter to look after the fields. The girl shoos away the birds, when she hears a voice coming from a tree root. The girl reports the event to her mother. Later, they both go to a temple festivity, and hear the voice again, this time it asks the girl to marry it and promises to erase her sorrows. The queen tells the king about the incident and the girl admits she wants to marry whoever is under the root. The king digs it up and finds a large python inside it. The python is brought to the girl's bed and becomes a handsome prince by shedding its snakeskin. The prince gives the girl gold jewels. The girl pretends to be ill, so she remains behind and burns the prince's snakeskin, keeping him human. The prince returns and finds the skin burnt. The girl answers that people would comment that she married a python, so she burned the snakeskin. After a week, the prince takes his mother-in-law with him. Back to the first queen, she learns her rival's daughter had a lucky match and asks the king to find a python for their daughter. The king captures a real python in the jungle, marries it to his other daughter in a ceremony and locks them up in a room. At night, the python devours the other girl slowly, and she complains to her mother the snake is eating her, but the first queen believes it to be a human prince bedecking her daughter. By morning, the first queen discocvers that the snake has devoured her daughter and finds her inside the python's belly.

The queen and the beautiful girl (Divyasundari) go to take a bath, when the queen asks her stepdaughter to trade clothes with her daughter to see who is more beautiful of the two, and turns Divyasundari into a bird that flies away, while the queen dresses her own daughter in Divyasundari's clothes to fool the king. The king notices that she is not his wife, and asks his in-laws if they have any news of his true wife, to no avail. On the road, he finds a Black-hooded oriole ("ହଳଦୀ ବସ‍ନ୍ତ", 'Haldi Basant', in the original), which sings about her half-sister's deception. The snake prince asks the bird to perch on his lap is it is his wife. The little bird does so, which confirms she is the snake prince's transformed wife. The prince kills the false wife, bakes a cake with her head, hands and feet and delivers it to his father-in-law's house. The king and his wife eat the cake, but realize they are eating the remains of their daughter.

==== The Python ====
In an Indian tale titled The Python, a king has two wives, queen Shobha, the elder and kind one, and queen Rupa, the younger and wicked one. He also has two daughters, one from each wife: Devi and Tara. The younger queen convinces the king to relocate the elder and her daughter to a small house outside the palace. Now in a humble situation, Shobha asks Devi to take their cows to graze. Devi does as asked, taking the cows to the jungle in the morning and coming back at night. This goes on for some time, until one evening a voice proposes to her. Afraid of what to say, she returns home. The next day, she tells her mother about it, and Shobha tells her to accept the voice's proposal, since they have nothing else to lose. At the end of the third day, Devi agrees to the proposal and asks the owner of the voice to come to her house the next morning. It happens thus, and a python appears at queen Shobha's door to marry Devi. A servant reports the incident to the other queen, Rupa, who comes to her co-queen's abode to insist her step-daughter goes through with the marriage with the python. Devi marries the python and both retire to their chambers, and Shobha prays no harm befalls her daughter. The next morning, however, a handsome prince opens Devi's door, and explains he was the python, cursed into that form by a jungle-god until a princess married him. Relieved with this development, queen Shobha takes her daughter and son-in-law to introduce him to the king. Queen Rupa, however, envying the other queen's success, orders her own daughter Tara to do the same actions her half-sister did: graze the cows in the jungle and agree to marriage with the first one that she hears in the jungle. Despite her redoing Devi's steps, no one talks to her in the jungle, so queen Rupa resorts to finding a python for her daughter. Tara and the python are married and brought to their room. The next morning, Rupa goes to check on her daughter, and find only the python with a swollen belly, the princess inside it. The cook comes with a large knife, kills the snake and releases Tara from the python's belly, still alive. The tale was also translated to Hungarian language with the title Az óriáskígyó ("The Giant Snake").

==== A Tale of a Snake ====
In a tale from the Angami Nagas of Assam, a girl is going to work in the field, when a snake appears and blocks her path. The girl tells the snake to not bite her, and she agrees to marry it. The snake bites the girl in her bosom and ornaments spring on her, then on her leg and leggings appear. Another girl sees the scene and tries to repeat with a snake, agreeing to marry it, but the snake bites her in the arm and she dies. The tale was republished by anthropologist John Henry Hutton, who also sourced it from the Angami Nagas. Goswami recognized it as a "parallel" to Champavati, but he suggested the Angami Naga tale was a borrowing. In the same vein, Assamese folklorist Birinchi Kumar Barua noted that the Angami tale "resembled" Champavati.

==== Bunyi-Bunye (The Two Sisters) ====
Professor Stuart Blackburn reported a tale from the Apatani people of Arunachal Pradesh with the title Bunyi-Bunye or Two Sisters. In this tale, two sisters go to pluck fruits from a tree, but a snake appears and offers them the fruits, since the tree is his, in exchange for marrying the animal. One of the girls marries the snake, eventually burns its skin and turns him to a human youth. As for her sister, jealous of her success, she finds another snake to marry (or her brother-in-law) and dies of a snakebite.

==== Jereng, The Orphan ====
Author Dewan Sing Rongmuthu collected a tale from a Garo teller named Dingban Marak Raksam, in Garo Hills. In this tale, titled Jereno, The Orphan (although the correct form is Jereng), an orphan named Jereng (also spelled Jerang) goes to the forest to fetch wild fruits from a tree, when two tigermen named Matchadus spot him up the tree. The Matchadus capture Jereng and bring him home to be devoured. The next day, the tigermen notice that they are "dark-skinned" while the boy is fair-skinned. Jereng dupes the Matchadus into bathing in boiling water, essentially killing themselves. He tricks the remaining Matchadus into crossing a river in earthen jars to chase him and they promptly drown. After this adventure, he takes refuge in a cave, kills a python dwelling inside it and wraps its skin around himself to sleep, along with his jewels and money. Some time later, he spies on two sisters shooing away the birds from their father's jhum plantation, and he falls in love with the younger sister. The younger sister passes by the cave and sees Jereng emerging from the python skin. She also falls in love with him, and is told that, if she wants to marry him, she is to hide out someplace else and, when her parents find her, she is to say she wants to marry a python. It happens thus: she hides in a granary, but is eventually found out, and explains she wishes to marry a python she found in a cave. Despite her parents' protests, she stays true to her decision and moves out to another house to wait for her husband. Some servants enter the snake's cave and carry the python bridegroom (inside of which is Jereng, but they are not aware of the fact) to the younger sister's marital house. At midnight, the girl utters a loud cry, and the servants rush to investigate: they see the girl, alive and well, sitting beside a handsome youth, Jereng, and the house is filled with jewels, money and precious cloth. The girl's father is relieved and content with his daughter's fortune. Meanwhile, the elder sister, wanting to have the same fortune of her cadette, repeats her actions (hiding in a certain spot and declaring her wishes to marry a python), and moves out to her own marital house. The servants find her a real live python and marry them off. At midnight, however, the girl utters a cry, and, the next morning, the servants find the python devoured the girl. Back to Jereng and his wife, their children become kings and queens, chieftains and warriors. P. Goswami also compared Jereng to the Assamese tale Champavati.

==== The Python Man ====
In a tale collected from the Zeme people with the title The Python Man, a couple have a rice plantation near a lake. One day, when they are shooing away birds, they spot a handsome young man walking towards the lake. They follow him and see him change himself into a python and slither into the water. The next day, the parents in the village have to attend a religious event, and the couple fear for their only daughter, so they send her to shoo away the birds from their rice field accompanied by their dog, with a warning not to go to the edge of the water. As for the girl, the python-man emerges out of the water in human form and the girl falls in love with him. The girl tells her parents she wishes to go back to the rice field, and keeps visiting the python-man in secret. Her parents learn of the clandestine meetings and decide to get rid of the python lover by griding some poison beans and brewing some wine, which they put in a jar along with a jar of beer for their daughter. On their meeting, the girl gives the python lover the poisoned wine unknowingly. The next day, the girl is not visited by her lover, and follows his tracks to the lake. She throws the dog in the lake, which enters it and returns without getting wet. The girl then dives into the water and reaches a large palace, where the python-man's parents live. The girl meets his parents and explains everything, telling them she wishes to marry their son. The python-man's parents reveal their son is sick, but let her visit him. They also dress her in dresses and ornaments, then send her back to her mother on land. The girl then tells everything to her parents. The girl's fortunate story spreads through the village and reaches the ears of a neighbour greedy couple. The greedy couple arrange for a python to be their son-in-law, and bring a large snake to their granary, then send their daughter to the granary. Before the girl tries to escape from the large python, her parents lock her in with the snake, which devours her. The girl's parents think they are courting each other, but, the next day, they find the python with a swollen belly. The couple kill the animal and rip open its belly, finding only their daughter's bangles and hair.

==== The Snake-Husband (Sherdukpen) ====
Anthropologist Verrier Elwin collected a tale from the Sherdukpen people, in Rupa, Kameng. In this tale, an old woman lives with her two daughters, the elder beautiful and somewhat skilled in weaving, and the younger more skilled, since she weaves more beautiful patterns. The former weaves only plain clothes. One night she goes to bathe in the river. A large snake appears in the water and frightens the girl back to the margin, but it turns into a handsome youth and assures the girl he means no harm. They fall in love with each other and see each other every night by the riverbank. One day, the girl complains that she wishes she could improve her weaving skills and the snake lover gives her a solution: she can copy on the loom the scaly patterns of his body. Inspired by her snake lover's body patterns, she weaves beautiful pieces of cloth. One day, the snake lover wants to marry her so they can live in his watery home. The girl seems reluctant at first, but eventually her lover calms her fears. Her mother asks her about her weaving skills, and she confesses about the snake lover. The mother warns her of a possible danger, since he is a snake. At any rate, the snake lover's procession comes to take his bride, their appearing as snakes to the whole village, but normal humans to her. She says goodbye to her mother, but tells she can call her by the river bank if she needs anything, then departs with her husband. Meanwhile, the younger sister wants to experience the same luck as the elder, and goes to river to find a snake to marry. She finds a black snake hole and, hoping it will become a handsome youth, she is killed by the black snake. Time passes, and their mother, now older, calls for her elder daughter by the riverbank. Her daughter appears and takes her to her husband's river palace, where she meets her grandchildren, who can change form between human and snake shapes. Her son-in-law gives her a bundle with a rope, sand, wood and grain. She takes the bundle with her and its contents become food for her to eat. Elwin republished the tale as The Snake-Husband.

==== Gunavati Kanya ====
Bengali scholarship located a similar tale in Tripura, which is said to be "a notable folktale" among the Tripuri people. In this tale, titled "গুণবতী কন্যা" ("Gunavati Kanya"), a widower and a widow that live in neighbouring villages marry each other and join their families together, since the man and the woman have their own daughters. However, the woman begins to mistreat her stepdaughter, the widower's beautiful daughter, giving her meager meals and forcing her to do the hard work. One day, she forces the girl to sell only a bit of cotton and bring back provisions (onions, garlic, dried fish, salt, mustard, some oil and firewood). Defeated, the girl realizes that she cannot buy too much by selling only a bit, and makes a vow to her mother's spirit that she will marry whoever helps her in this task. A young man appears and offers to help Gunavati. They spend their time talking and knowing each other, and arrive at Gunavati's house. The young man tells her to keep his small-sized shape in a corner of the basket, since her parents may not like him. Gunavati's father sees that his daughter brought many provisions, and finds a snake at the bottom of the basket. However, while her family sees him as a snake, Gunavati sees him as a young man. Later, he goes to Gunavati's room and plots with her to test Gunavati's parents' love for her: the man, in snake form, sleeps in Gunavati's room with her and she screams for help, saying that she is being devoured bit by bit (legs, knees, waist, navel, stomach, and chest). It happens thus, and the father tries to go to help her, but his wife put out the lamp and they return to bed, for she hopes her stepdaughter is swallowed. The next morning, Gunavati leaves her room, bedecked in beautiful ornaments, to her stepmother's jealousy. Her companion also exits the room in human shape. Still living with her family, Gunavati is forced to perform task after task, like hoeing the large field of jhum, threshing the rice or build a fence, which she does with a smile. Gunavati marries the snake man. Gunavati's stepmother decides to find a snake for her own daughter and brings back a real animal from the forest. The second snake, however, wakes up and devours Gunavati's stepsister during the night. The neighbours assemble to kill the snake, but Gunavati's husband forbids them from doing anything to the animal. Gunavati's husband then finds the snake, cuts up its stomach and retrieves his stepsister-in-law, who is dead. He stitches the snake's belly and revives his wife's stepsister by pouring some water on her and calling on the name of Mahadev.

==== Termite Husband ====
In a Tripuri tale translated to Bengali as "উইপোকা স্বামী" or "উই পোকা স্বামী" ("Termite Husband"), a farmer lives with a wife. A daughter is born to them, and the woman dies, and the man takes care of his orphan daughter on his own by doing all the housework. He then marries a widow with her daughter, and they make up a new family unit. The woman's daughter, Sambhan, is older, and the man's daughter, Nakuti, is younger. One day, the new wife comments with her husband that it is time to marry their daughters off, who are of marriageable age like other young people. The woman presses her husband further to find the girl a husband and the man decides to look for his prospective son-in-law by taking a washung curry and some rice with him and wait in the forest. The man brings the food in his chempai (a type of bag), calls out in the forest for someone to appear and become his son-in-law. He ventures further and further in the forest and reaches a termite mound, from where a voice echoes. The man leaves the food on the ground, thinking the prospective son-in-law is too shy to come out and join him, when a swarm of termites fly in to eat the food. The man decides this shall be his daughter's husband, and takes the entire swarm back home with him. He pours out the termites on the bed (also some red ants), to his wife's horror, who asks how they can be a son-in-law, when they are only termites. The woman calls for her stepdaughter, and orders her to sleep with the termites in her room, since they will become her husband. The girl cries for this situation, and the woman forces her into her room. At night, the insects bite her feet and hands. In the morning, she goes to work in the fields, and her stepdaughter tells the other young people that the girl is sleeping with termites for a husband. Humiliated and ashamed, the girl stops her work and returns home, and lives with the swarm at night for days. One night, however, a handsome young prince appears from the termites and reveals a sorcerer cursed him to insect form, and only if a woman accepting him the spell can be broken. The following morning, Nakuti, the girl's name, goes to cook a fine repast for her husband, and her stepmother notices she is wearing some new jewelry and acting too happy, so she suspects there is another man in the house with them. Back to the girl, that same night, the prince appears to her again and she discusses with him the idea of having a family, something that his current form does not allow. Thus, the prince advises the girl to burn all termites in a fire and press his hands and feet.

The following night, the girl does as instructed, burns the entire termite swarm and washes her husband feet and hands. Later, she goes to prepare some food for him, and her stepmother suspects something, so she spies on Nakuti's door: inside she finds a handsome youth of divine beauty. Surprised by her discovery, the woman calls for the neighbours to come see him. The other villagers ask him where is his house, and the prince says he was the son of a king, cursed into swarm form by a sorcerer, and now the love of his bride restored him, so he will return to his kingdom with her. Jealous of her stepdaughter's fortunate marriage to the prince, the woman begins to pester her husband about her own daughter's marriage, and urges him to find a suitable groom for her daughter by doing the same actions he did previously. Thus, he takes the curry dish and goes to the forest, calling for someone to become his son-in-law. He waits until nightfall and no one appears to him, so he decides to come home. On the road, he passes by a jhum field, sees a sleeping python ("ajagara") and takes the animal back home. The man brings the python and announces his wife's daughter must sleep with it in the same room, so she is locked with the reptile. At night, the serpent begins to slowly devour the girl, first by the feet, then knees, waist, and chest. The girl cries out for her mother that she is being devoured, but the woman dismisses it and says it is merely the python bedecking her with jewel. Eventually, the woman's daughter is swallowed whole. The following morning, the woman cannot find her daughter, nor the groom anywhere in the house, but discovers the sleeping python under a banana tree. The villagers arm themselves with axes, kill the python and open it: inside, the bones of the dead girl. The first part of the tale, with the termite husband, was classified by Dr. Arundhati Roy as type 441 of the international Aarne-Thompson Index.

==== A Python becomes a Prince ====
In a tribal folktale from Tripura translated to Hindi as "अजगर बना राजकुमार" ("A Python becomes a Prince"), a king has two queens, the elder Shanti, kind and calm, and younger Upa, harsh and wicked, and a daughter by each one: Tuli by the elder and Shukla by the younger. The younger one is ambitious and hates the older rival, so she expels the elder and her stepdaughter from the palace. The king moves them out to a hut outside the palace. The younger queen orders princess Tuli to graze the king's cows in the forest each day, which she does in the morning and returns with them at night. One day, she returns home with the cows when she hears a voice asking her to marry them. Princess Tuli informs her mother about it, and the older queen advises her daughter to reply for the voice to come at their house. Tuli questions her mother how she can agree to marriage with someone unknown, and the queen reassures her daughter by saying that it would be better than the situation they are in now. At night, she replies to the voice in the forest that she agrees to marry him and invites them to her house. The following morning, a python appears by Tuli's hut. The python says he was called and answered Tuli's invitation to come marry her. The queen accepts that this was fate. The younger queen learns of this and issues a decree that the elder co-queen and the princess go through with the marriage, as it was tradition. Princess Tuli marries the python, and her mother prays for her daughter's wellbeing. The following morning, the queen knocks on her daughter's door and a handsome youth answers it. The youth explains he is a prince, cursed to python form by a forest god, whom he begged for released, and the forest god predicts that he can be restored if he marries a good-natured princess. The elder queen is relieved and introduces her son-in-law and her daughter to the palace. The younger queen is surprised at this development and wishes her own daughter Shukla finds someone like Tuli did. She sends Shukla to herd the cows, like her half-sister did, and she has to wait for a voice, but none comes. As an alternative, the younger queen brings a large python for her daughter, marries them off, and locks them in room. In the morning, the younger queen finds no sign of her daughter, only the python. The king's commander alerts that the princess is in the python's belly, due to its being swollen, and quickly cuts open its belly to pull a still alive princess Shukla. The younger queen apologizes for her actions.

==== Other tales ====
According to scholar Kunja Behari Dash, in an Orissan tale titled Princess & Python, a princess is forced by her stepmother to marry a python. Luckily, the python reveals himself to be a handsome prince. Jealous of her stepdaughter's successful marriage, the queen asks her husband to fetch a python for her own daughter. The second python, being a real animal, devours the girl during the night.

=== Sri Lanka ===
==== The Ash-Pumpkin Fruit Prince ====
Author Henry Parker collected a tale from the North central Province of Ceylon (modern day Sri Lanka), titled The Ash-Pumpkin Fruit Prince. In this tale, in a village, a husband and a wife bring home an Ash-pumpkin and put it in a pot under seven earthen pots. Some time later, a snake appears in place of the gourd. The couple prepare seven beds, so large is the snake, and arrange an assistant (a wife) for the snake. They contact seven sisters who live in the village and one by one, they enter the snake's hut. Frightened at the large snake, they refuse to marry it, for fear for their lives. Only the youngest and seventh sister decides to marry it: she enters the hut, but complains that there is not enough space for her, so the snake spares one of the seven beds for her. This goes on for the next seven nights: on each night, the girl complains about lack of space to sleep, and the snake retreats from one bed on each night, until, after seven days, it comes to the veranda. The girl's mother-in-law teaches the girl to prepare food for her snake husband: "lower a little paddy from the corn store, and having winnowed, boil it". The girl prepares the food a certain way that displeases the snake husband, who teaches her the correct way to do it. Some time later, there will be a bana (reading of Buddhist scripture) at the pansala of the village. The snake husband convinces his human wife to go. She tells him that other women are going with their husbands, so he suggests she goes with her in-laws, while he stays home. After the human wife and his parents go to the pansala, the snake husband takes off his python jacket, places it on the clothes-line and goes to the pansala as a prince. The human wife sees the prince, goes back home and burns the python jacket in the hearth. Some time later, the now human snake prince goes with his wife to visit his parents-in-law. His six sisters-in-law admire him and claim he is their co-husband, but the human wife reproaches her sisters. The eldest daughter, then, asks her father to find a python for her to marry, so he goes to the jungle, captures a python and gives it to his daughter. That night, the python - an animal, in fact - coils around the girl and begins to eat her. The next morning, the father notices his daughter's death and shoos away the python. The tale was also translated into Russian as "Сын из тыквы" ("Son in a Pumpkin") and classified by its compilers as tale type AaTh 433C.

=== Bangladesh ===
==== Marriage with Snake Prince ====
In a Bengali tale from Ramu Upazila with the title "সাপ কুমারের সাথে বিয়ে" ("Marriage with Snake Prince"), a couple has a daughter named Bilkis Banu, a very beautiful girl. She grows up in beauty and her parents worry about finding her a suitable husband, but no suitor appears. Suddenly, the father dies, and he is buried with help of their community. Now left alone, Bilkis and her mother worry about finding her a bridegroom, and yet none comes, to her mother's, Sona Banu, concern. One day, near winter (the month of Paush), Bilkis Banu and Sona Banu are trying to warm themselves in the sun. At night, while the women are asleep, a python appears at their front porch, since they live in a mountainous area near deep forests, and stretches itself. The mother and daughter find the animal and close the door, hoping that it goes away, but it remains there. Sona Banu notices that the snake is still there and wrongfully believes it to be a prince in the shape of a snake. Being greedy, she dresses her daughter Bilkis Banu and marries her to the snake, locking her outside. The snake is hungry, wakes up and begins to swallow the girl. Bilkis Banu complains that she is being devoured bit by bit (first by the feet, then the legs, thirdly the waist, followed by her back and hands, lastly her throat and head), while her mother Sona Banu sings a song to calm her down, mentioning the ornaments she believes she will get. Finally, Bilkis Banu is devoured wholesale, but her mother believes that the snake prince will spit her out and become human. Night comes and the snake remains motionless, then spits out the clothes and slithers back to the forest at dawn. Sona Banu opens the door in the morning and finds no snake, nor her daughter, only her clothes, then laments that she let her daughter be devoured by a real snake.

==== Snake Human ====
In a tale from the Marma people sourced from the Bandarban District and translated to Bengali as "সর্প মানব" ("Snake Human"), an old couple have three daughters and they live in a village surrounded by mountains. One day, they go to wash dirty clothes in the river and spot a red fruit on the water. They pluck it and eat the delicious fruit, then decide to walk upstream to see if they can discover the tree that yields them. They find a tree, but a large snake coiled on a branch. The old woman asks the snake to give two fruits for them, if it is good. The couple decide that they want more fruits, and the old woman offers her eldest daughter and the middle one to the snake if it releases more fruits. Lastly, the woman mentions her cadette, and the snake shakes the branches, causing all the fruits to fall. The couple pluck them all and carry them home, forgetting about the promise and dismissing the notion of a human girl marrying a snake. Still, the snake comes to the couple's house the following day, and circles around it. Afraid of the snake, the woman explains the situation to her daughters. The elder two refuse to marry the snake, save for the youngest. The cadette enters a room and lies in bed, while the snake is coiled in a corner. At night, the snake removes his skin and becomes a handsome youth that tells her he is human under a curse due to a witch's spell, and could only be saved if a woman agreed to marry him. The girl believes the youth's words and quickly burns the snakeskin. The youth feels a little burn, but is otherwise safe and is restored to human form. The girl tells her parents about it and they are relieved. The girl and the youth marry and have a son.

The story of the fortunate marriage and transformation spreads around, and, in a neighbouring village, a woman with five single daughters of marriageable age learns of this and wishes to arrange a wedding between a python and her daughters. Thus, the village circles the forest and captures one snake they bring home. They place the python with the woman's elder daughter in a room. At night, the python wakes up and starts to swallow her body part by body part: first the knees, then the waist, and the throat. The girl complains to her mother she is being devoured, but the woman dismisses her pleas, until there is only silence. The following morning, the woman knocks on the door and, after getting no response, breaks into her room: only the python is there, and there is no trace of her elder daughter, save the python. They decide to cut up the snake, and summon the former snake man to help them. The youth goes to cut the reptile in three pieces, each time a drop of its blood dripping on his skin: on the chest, on the neck and on the forehead. This turns the youth back into a snake, to everyone's surprise and horror. His wife cries for his fate, and he even rocks his son with his snake tail. However, his in-laws fear his new form, even his wife and son. Thus, the snake slithers back into the forest, never to be seen again.

=== America ===
Portuguese scholars Isabel Cárdigos and Paulo Jorge Correia locate 12 Brazilian variants in the Portuguese Folktale Catalogue: the heroine marries a snake that becomes a human prince, her sister marries a snake and dies.

=== Africa ===
Folklore scholar Hasan M. El-Shamy registers two variants of type AaTh 433C in the Middle East and Northern Africa, which he located in Egypt.

== See also ==
- Princess Himal and Nagaray
- The story of Halahala Kumar
- The Snake Prince
- The Fisher-Girl and the Crab
- The Ruby Prince (Punjabi folktale)
- The King of the Snakes
- King Iguana
- The Story of the Hamadryad
- The Origin of the Sirenia
- God of Waters (Sre folktale)
- The Dragon-Prince and the Stepmother
- The Stepdaughter and the Black Serpent
- The Girl With Two Husbands
- The Enchanted Brahmin's Son
