= Ananda Chandra Barua =

Indian writer, poet, playwright and journalist (1907–1983)

- Born: 31 December 1907; Moran, Jorhat, Assam
- Died: 27 January 1983 (aged 75)
- Occupations: Writer; poet; playwright; translator; journalist; actor
- Spouse: Promila Devi
- Relatives: Anupama Bhattacharjya (niece)
- Writing career
- Language: Assamese
- Notable awards: Sahitya Academy Award (1977); Padmashree (1970)

Ananda Chandra Barua (1907–1983) was a writer, poet, playwright, translator, journalist and actor from Assam. He is popularly known as Bokulbonor Kobi in Assamese literacy society. He was honoured with, most notably the Padma Shri title and Sahitya Akademi award.

== Literacy works ==
Published books

- Porag (1930) (Poem collection)
- Bijoya (1932) (drama)
- Hafizor Sur (1933) (translation of poems)
- Bisorjan (1933) (drama)
- Ranjan Rashmi (1934), (Poem collection)
- Puspak (1934) (sonnets)
- Nal Damayanty (1934) (drama)
- Meghdoot Purbamegh (1940) (translated poems)
- Komota Kuwori (1940) (drama)
- Asiar Jyoti (1960)

Translation work;

- Soviet Kabita (1968)(translated poems)
- Kumar Sambhav (1969)(translated poems)
- Paporir Porimal (1969) (Poem collection)
- Bokul Bonor Kabita (1976)(Poem collection)
- Sei Nimati Puware Pora (1982) (Poem collection)
- Kopoi Kuwari (Children drama)
- Nilanjan (drama)
- Pondit Modon Mohan Malaviyar Jiboni (biography of Pandit Madan Mohan Malaviya)
- Ethan From (translations)

Unpublished but completed works

- Panchami (children drama)
- Tejimola (children drama)
- Phulora (children’s one-act-play)
- Sahjahanor Ontim (translated play)
- Bonik Bondhu (translated play)
- Sitaharan (drama)
- Mrigamaya (drama) and
- Banipath (for school curriculum)
- Agnigarh (drama)
- Asomiya Deka (novel) and
- Amar Sahitya (for public education)

== Awards and honours ==
Barua received the fourth-highest civilian award ‘Padma Shri' (1970) from the Government of India on 21 April 1970.

For his poetry book Bokul Bonor Kabita (1976), he achieved the Sahitya Academy Award in 1977.

Bakulbon Park (বকুলবন উদ্যান) is named after Ananda Chandra Barua in Jorhat as a tribute to him.

The Bakul Bon Award is conferred every year in the fields of dancing, music, art and literature in the memory of 'Bakul Bonor Kabi' Ananda Chandra Barua by the Bakul Bon Trust, Assam which carries a sum of Rs 10,000 in cash and a citation.

== See also ==
- Assamese literature
- History of Assamese literature
- List of Asam Sahitya Sabha presidents
- List of Sahitya Akademi Award winners for Assamese
- List of Assamese-language poets
- List of Assamese writers with their pen names
