= Anupama Bhattacharjya =

Indian actress (1928–2022)

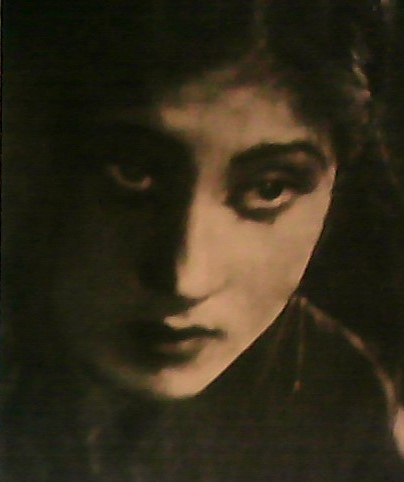
- Born: 19 August 1928; Amolapatty, Sivasagar
- Died: 30 January 2022 (aged 93); Guwahati
- Occupations: Actress, radio announcer
- Notable work: Siraj (1948 film)
- Spouse(s): Uday Bhattacharjya; Shivanath Bhattacharjya
- Children: 1
- Relatives: Lakshminath Bezbaruah (paternal uncle); Ananda Chandra Baruah (maternal uncle)

Anupama Bhattacharjya (19 August 1928 – 30 January 2022) also known as Meena Kumari of Assam was an Indian actress in the Assamese film and stage industry. She acted in plays, radio, films, and television from the 1940s until recent times.

== Early life ==
Anupama Bhattacharjya was born on 19 August 1928 in Amolapatty, Sivasagar, into a Bezbaruah family. Her father was Gopal Bezbaruah, and her mother was Gunda Bezbaruah. She had three sisters and a brother. Rasaraj Lakshminath Bezbaruah was her paternal uncle, and poet Ananda Chandra Baruah was her maternal uncle.

She spent her childhood under strict discipline and traditional Brahminical practices. Despite household duties, she was passionate about dancing, singing, and acting. She especially loved watching movies, often sneaking out to watch them, particularly those featuring Meena Kumari.

== Personal life ==
At the age of nine, Anupama was married to Uday Bhattacharjya. However, a few months after the wedding, her husband passed away. Recalling the event, she said:

"A few months later, one day my mother suddenly started crying. Women from the neighborhood came and took off my jewelry, wiped the vermilion from my forehead, and told me I had become a widow. The man I was married to had died of fever. I didn't even know what that meant. All I felt was that without the jewelry, my body felt lighter, and I could play more freely."

Later, while acting in the 1948 film Siraj, she married the film's music director, Shivanath Bhattacharjya. They had a daughter named Runumi. In 1953, Shivanath died, leaving her a widow again at the age of 22. Without any support, she was forced to act in plays to raise her child. Her daughter, a talented singer, died after giving birth to two daughters. After her daughter’s death, Bhattacharjya released some of her popular songs under the title "O Chikun Bihuti."

== Acting career ==
While living as a widow, she was approached by Phani Sharma with a proposal to act in the film Siraj. Despite social restrictions, she took up the offer, which led to her family being ostracized. In Siraj, she played the character of Fatema. During the filming, she married the film's music director, Shivanath Bhattacharjya.

Anupama Bhattacharjya acted in films such as Nimila Ank, Natun Prithibi, Manab aru Danab, Siraj, Sarapaat, Rangdhali, Mon aru Morom, and Biplobi. She also worked in Natraj Theatre for two years, performing in plays like Sirajuddoula, Kiyo, Bhogjora, and Kashmir Kumari. Additionally, she served as a radio announcer and stage artist.

== Awards and recognition ==
- Kalaguru Bishnu Rabha Award
- Aideu Handique Award
- Promothesh Chandra Barua Award for Lifetime Achievement
- Wayzman Award for Mobile Theatre

== Death ==
On 30 January 2022, at 5:50 PM, she died at GMCH (Guwahati Medical College and Hospital).
