= Burhi Aair Sadhu =

Assamese folklore collection

Buṛhī Āir Sādhu Burhi Air Xadhu
- Author: Lakshminath Bezbaruah
- Original title: বুঢ়ী আইৰ সাধু
- Language: Assamese
- Genre: Story book
- Publisher: Banlata Prakashan
- Publication date: 1911
- Publication place: Assam, India
- Media type: Printed
- ISBN: 81-7339-215-3

Buṛhī Āir Sādhu or Burhi Air Xadhu (Note: Assamese: বুঢ়ী আইৰ সাধু, Buṛhī Āir Sādhu, pronounced [buɹʱi aɪɹ xadʱu], lit. 'Grandmother's Takes'.) (Assamese: বুঢ়ী আইৰ সাধু, Buṛhī Āir Sādhu, pronounced [buɹʱi aɪɹ xadʱu], lit. 'Grandmother's Takes') is a collection of stories or folklore, that have been compiled by famous Assamese author and poet Lakshminath Bezbaruah. It is one of the most popular texts in Assamese literature. This book was first published in October–November 1911. After the first publication 100 years have been passed and countless editions of the book have been published. This book is now in the public domain as per copyright law of India.

== Book description ==
Some of the 30 folklores included in the book were his own. The preface itself was a narration regarding genesis, movement and importance of folklores in different societies and communities of the world.

=== List of stories ===
The following list includes the titles of the stories in the original Assamese (sometimes with an alternate spelling) and their respective English translations.

1. Bandor aru Xial - The Monkey and the Fox
2. Dhura Kauri aru Tiposi Sorai - The Jungle Crow and the Wren; The Raven and the Wren
3. Mekurir Jiyekor Xadhu - The Tale of the Cat's Daughter; The tale of the cat's daughters
4. Dighalthengia - The Long-Legged One
5. Budhiyok Xial - The Tale of a Cunning Fox
6. Bagh aru Kekura (Bagh Aru Kekorar Sadhu) - The Tale of the Tiger and the Crab
7. Tejimola
8. Burha-Buri aru Xial - The Old Man, the Old Woman and the Fox
9. Gangatup - The Globefish or Gangatope; Gongatoup
10. Xorobjan (Sarabjan) - The All-Knowing One
11. Silonir Jiyekor Xadhu - The Tale of the Kite's Daughter
12. Eta Boli Manuh (Ata Bolee Manuh) - The Tale of a Strong Man
13. Kukurikona (Kukurikana) - Purblind
14. Tula aru Teja - Toola and Teja; Tula and Teja
15. Kotajuwa Naak Kharoni di Dhak (Kata Jowa nak Kharani di dhak) - Chopped off nose, Cover it with Alkali
16. Bhekulir Xadhu - The Story of a Frog
17. Tawoiekor Xadhu (Tawoir Sadhu) - The tale of the father's best friend
18. Lotkon (Latkan)
19. Lokhimi Tiruta (Lakhimi Tirota) - The Woman with a Midas Touch
20. Dui Budhiyok - Two Cunning Fellows
21. Kanchani
22. Ou Kuwori (Ow Kooanri) - The Ow-Princess; Ou-princess; Elephant-Fruit Princess
23. Ejoni Malini aru Ejupa Phool - A Flower-Maiden and a Flower Plant; A lady-gardener and a flowering plant
24. Numoliya Pu - The Youngest Child
25. Eta Xingora Maasor Kotha - The Tale of a Singara Fish; The tale of a singora-fish; Story of A Catfish
26. Tikhor Aru Suti Bai (Tikhar aru Sutibai) - Tikhar and Sutibai
27. Champavati (Champabati)
28. Jaradgab Rojar Upokhyan (Jaradgab Rajar Upakhyan) - Tale of King Jaradgab
29. Panexoi (Panesoi)
30. Juwair Xadhu (Jouwair Sadhu) - Tale of a son-in-law

== Source of stories ==
The author collected these stories from the common native people of Assam and then prepared this book. The names he mentioned in the preface of the book who contributed the folklores (but without explicitly mentioning who contributed which one) were Bhramarendra Saikia, Mahi Chandra Bora, Sitanath Sharma, Sarveshwar Sharma Kotoky, Rudrakanta Goswami, Wajed Ali, Naranath Sharma, Rusheswar Sharma, Padmadhar Chaliha, Ratnakanta Sharma, Haladhar Bhuyan, Guluk Chandra Sharma, Meghnath Deka, Roop Chandra Barua, Dinanath Medhi, Lokonath Das, Gobinda Chandra Choudhuri, and Dineswar Dutta.

== English translation ==
This book was translated to English as "Old Mother's Wise Tales" by Nripen Dutta Baruah and published by LBS Publications, India.

== Modern uses and adaptations ==
The stories have been notably adapted for screen, stage, and television over the years.

=== Films ===
- An Assamese film, Haladhar (1991), was made from a story of this book by Sanjeev Hazorika.
- Another Assamese movie, Tula aru Teja, directed by Junmoni Devi Khaund and released on 13 April 2012 is based on the story of this book of the same name.
- In 2013, Metanormal Motion Pictures announced a new project inspired by four stories contained in Burhi Aair Sadhu. Titled Kothanodi, the film was expected to release in 2015. The four stories referenced in the film are Tejimola, Champawati, Ou Kuwori (The Outenga Maiden) and Tawoir Xadhu (The Story of Tawoi).
