= O Mur Apunar Desh =

State song of Assam, India

English: O My Endearing Country!
- অ' মোৰ আপোনাৰ দেশ
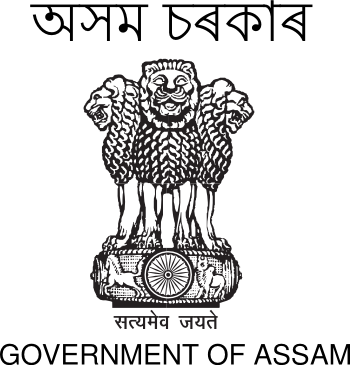
- Emblem of Assam
- State song of Assam
- Lyrics: Lakshminath Bezbarua
- Music: Kamala Prasad Agarwala
- Adopted: 1927 (de facto); 15 December 2013 (de jure)

O Mur Apunar Desh (Assamese pronunciation: [o mʊɹ apʊnaɹ dex]) is the state and traditional song of Assam, India. It was written by Lakshminath Bezbarua and the tune was made by Kamala Prasad Agarwala. It was first published in 1909 in an Assamese magazine named Bahi ("flute"). It was adopted as the Assam's state song in 1927 at asom chatrô sônmilôn ("Assam Student Conference") held in Tezpur, and was officially adopted by the state government on 15 December 2013. This song is also used as the anthem of the secessionist, United Liberation Front of Asom, as an anthem for a sovereign Assam.

The song was translated to Mising by Tabu Taid.

== The song ==
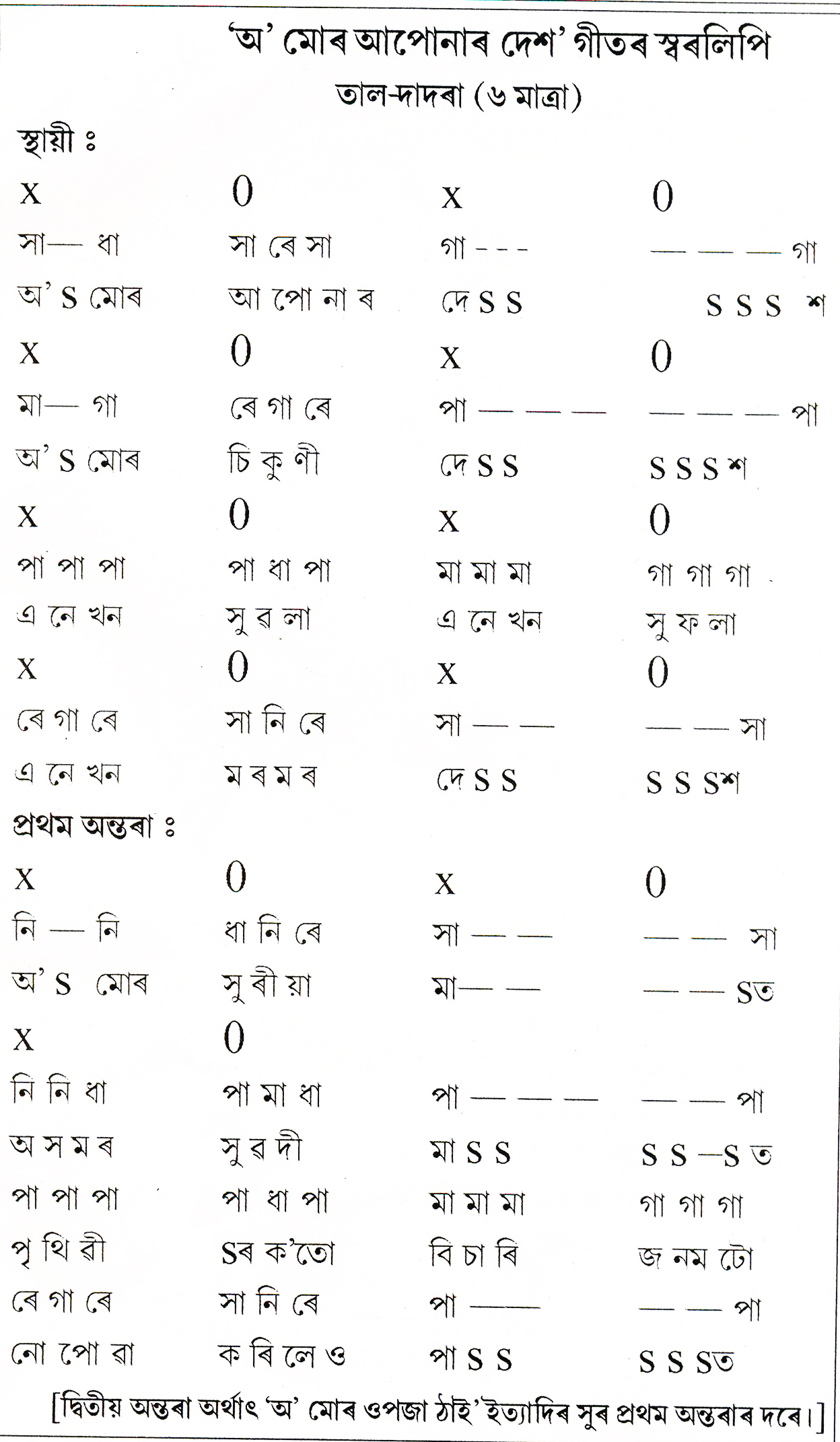
Notation of O Mur Apunar Desh

Assamese	Transliteration	Phonetic transcription (IPA)	English
অ' মোৰ আপোনাৰ দেশ অ' মোৰ চিকুণী দেশ এনেখন শুৱলা, এনেখন সুফলা এনেখন মৰমৰ দেশ। অ' মোৰ সুৰীয়া মাত অসমৰ সুৱদী মাত পৃথিৱীৰ ক'তো বিচাৰি জনমটো নোপোৱা কৰিলেও পাত। অ' মোৰ ওপজা ঠাই অ' মোৰ অসমী আই চাই লওঁ এবাৰ মুখনি তোমাৰ হেঁপাহ মোৰ পলোৱা নাই।	Ö mür apünar dex Ö mür sikuni dex Enekhon xuwola, enekhon xuphola Enekhon moromor dex Ö mür xuriya mat oxomor xuwodi mat Prithiwir kötü, bisari zonomtü nüpüa korileü pat Ö mür üpoza thai Ö mür oxomi ai Sai loü̃ ebar, mukhoni tümar Hẽpah mür polüwa nai.	[o mʊɹ apʊnaɹ dex] [o mʊɹ sikuni dex] [ɛnɛkʰɔn xuɔla ɛnɛkʰɔn xupʰɔla] [ɛnɛkʰɔn mɔɹɔmɔɹ dex] [o mʊɹ xuɹia mat] [ɔxɔmɔɹ xuodi mat] [pɹitʰiβiɹ kotʊ bisaɹi zɔnɔmtʊ] [nʊpʊw koɹilɛʊ pat] [o mʊɹ ʊpɔza tʰai] [o mʊɹ ɔxɔmi ai] [sai lɔʊ̃ ɛbaɹ mukʰoni tʊmaɹ] [ɦɛ̃paɦ mʊɹ pɔlʊwa nai]	O my endearing country O my speckless country So euphonious, so bounteous So near and dear a country O my euphonious voice The melodic voice of Assam; Nowhere in the world, you can ever find even if you scour through life. O my land of birth O my mother Assam; Let me have one (more) look at your face My heart hasn't been sated.

The key of the song is D major and its rhythm is waltz. The song was translated by Krishna Dulal Barua.

== See also ==
- List of Indian state songs
