= Lakshminath Bezbarua =

Indian poet, novelist and playwright

Rasarāj (Note: Assamese: ৰসৰাজ, Assamese pronunciation: [ɹɔxɔɹaz], lit. 'King of Humour'.); Sāhityarathī (Note: Assamese: সাহিত্যৰথী, Assamese pronunciation: [xaɦitːɔɹɔtʰi], lit. 'Charioteer of Literature'.); Lakshminath Bezbaroa
- লক্ষ্মীনাথ বেজবৰুৱা
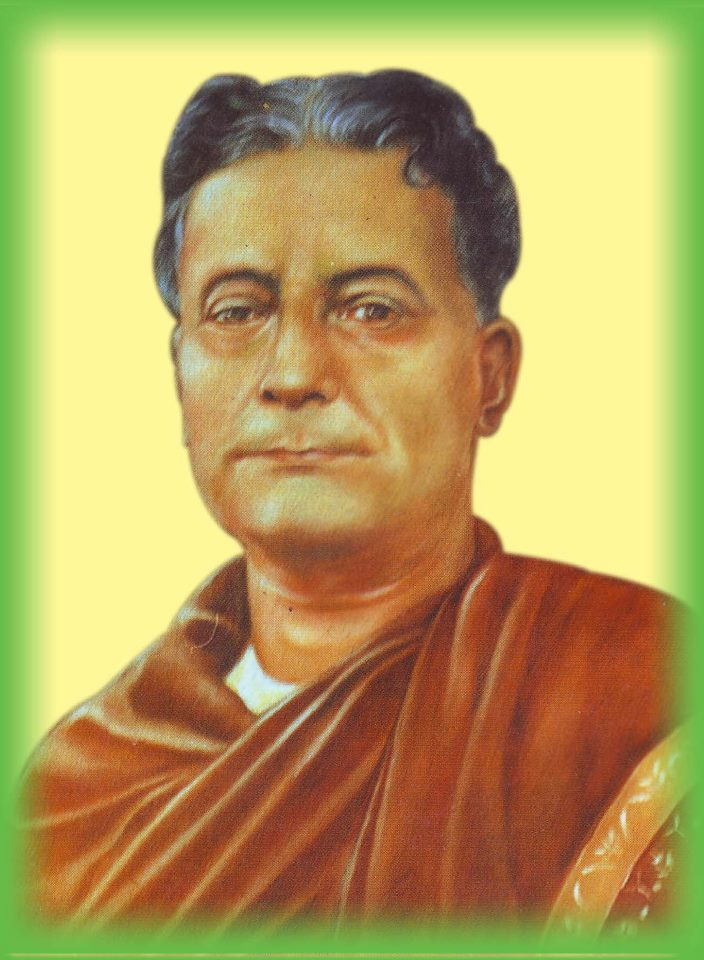
- Portrait of Bezbaroa
- Pronunciation: [lɔxminatʰ bɛzbɔɹua]
- Born: 14 October 1868; Ahatguri, Nagaon, Assam, Bengal Presidency, British Raj (now Assam, India)
- Died: 26 March 1938 (aged 73); Dibrugarh, Assam Province, British Raj (now Assam, India)
- Citizenship: British Indian
- Education: General Assembly's Institution (B.A.)
- Occupations: Poet; short story writer; essayist; novelist; playwright; satirist; editor; businessman
- Years active: 1889–1938
- Era: Jonaki era
- Works: Bibliography
- Spouse: Pragyasundari Devi (m. 1891; died 1938)
- Children: 4
- Parents: Dinanath Bezbarua (father); Thaneshwari Devi (mother)
- Relatives: Anupama Bhattacharjya (niece)
- Awards: Full list
- Writing career
- Pen name: Kripabar Barbarua; Kripabar Barua
- Language: Assamese; English
- Period: Modern
- Genres: Poetry; novel; short story; folklore; children's literature; satire; play; translation
- Notable works: Podum Kũwori; Xurobhi; Burhi Air Xadhu; Ö Mür Apünar Dex; Mür Jiwon Xü̃woron; Oxomiya Bhaxa Aru Xahityo; History of Vaishnavism in India
- Movement: Assamese Language Movement

Signature
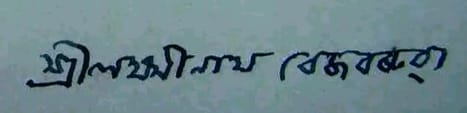

Lakshminath Bezbaroa (Note: Assamese: লক্ষ্মীনাথ বেজবৰুৱা, Assamese pronunciation: [lɔkʰminatʰ bɛzbɔɹua] or [lɔxminatʰ bɛzbɔɹua].) (Assamese: লক্ষ্মীনাথ বেজবৰুৱা, pronounced [lɔkʰminatʰ bɛzbɔɹua]; 14 October 1864 – 26 March 1938) was an Indian poet, essayist, novelist and playwright from Assam. Commonly known as the father of the Assamese short story, he was one of the literary stalwarts of the Jonaki era, the age of romanticism in Assamese literature. With his essays, plays, fiction, poetry and satires, he gave a new impetus to the then stagnating Assamese literary caravan.

He responded to the prevailing social environment through his satirical works to bring and sustain positive changes to the former. His literature reflected the deeper urges of the Assamese people.

== Early life ==
There is confusion regarding the date of birth of Bezbaroa and also a story behind it as told by Bezbaroa himself. In the first line of the first paragraph of the first chapter of his auto-biography Mür Jiwon Xü̃woron, Bezbaroa confirms outright his inability to remember his exact date of birth that his parents used to tell him. But later when he grew young and required to put his date of birth for essential records, he invented a date for the purpose viz."1868 AD, November", but was born in 1864. He writes that he would like to offer this piece of information to anyone interested in knowing about his date of birth, although he is unsure whether that information would in any way affect the balance-sheet of anyone's life. In the next line he explicitly writes that approximately translates into

"I am not convinced that on hearing, knowing or composing the news of my incarnation to destroy the "Annasur" (Food Devil) in that given year, perhaps two or four years earlier or later for that matter, the mankind shall be at any loss or profit or concede any damage."

In the very next paragraph, he went on describing in detail how and why the Bundle of Birth charts, kept religiously and secretly away from the kids by his parents, which contained his one he knew for certain during his childhood, was lost.

In Assamese literature, the term "Jonaki Jugor Trimurti" (জোনাকী যুগৰ ত্ৰিমূৰ্তি)—or the "Trinity of the Jonaki Era"—refers to the three legendary pioneers who laid the foundation for modern Assamese literature which includes Lakshminath Bezbaroa himself.

Bezbaroa has however confirmed in his auto-biography that he was born in the autumn on a full-moon night, on which "Lakshmi Puja" (A Hindu festival of worship of Goddess Lakshmi) is celebrated in India, and to mark the coincidence, he was named by his parents as "Lakshminath" (A name for Vishnu, the Hindu God and husband of Goddess Lakshmi). This autumn-festival celebrated in the full-moon of Ashvin usually falls in the month of October in any year. As per a NASA website data, there was only one full-moon day in the month of November 1868 and that was on 30th but that was not the day of celebration of Lakshmi puja in that year. Presently, the Assam Sahitya Sabha has settled on a date – 14 October 1864, that was a full-moon night of Lakshmi Puja in India, for his date of birth.

== Education ==
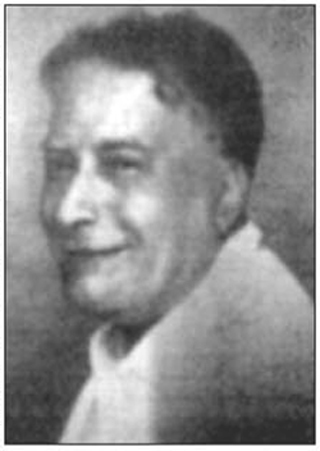
Photograph of Bezbaroa

Bezbaroa received his early education at Sivasagar Government High School at Sivasagar. Thereafter he studied for his F.A. from the City College and subsequently graduated with a B.A. from the General Assembly's Institution in Calcutta. Then he took his admission in M.A. and B.L. degrees from the University of Calcutta, but he couldn't complete either.

== Business career ==
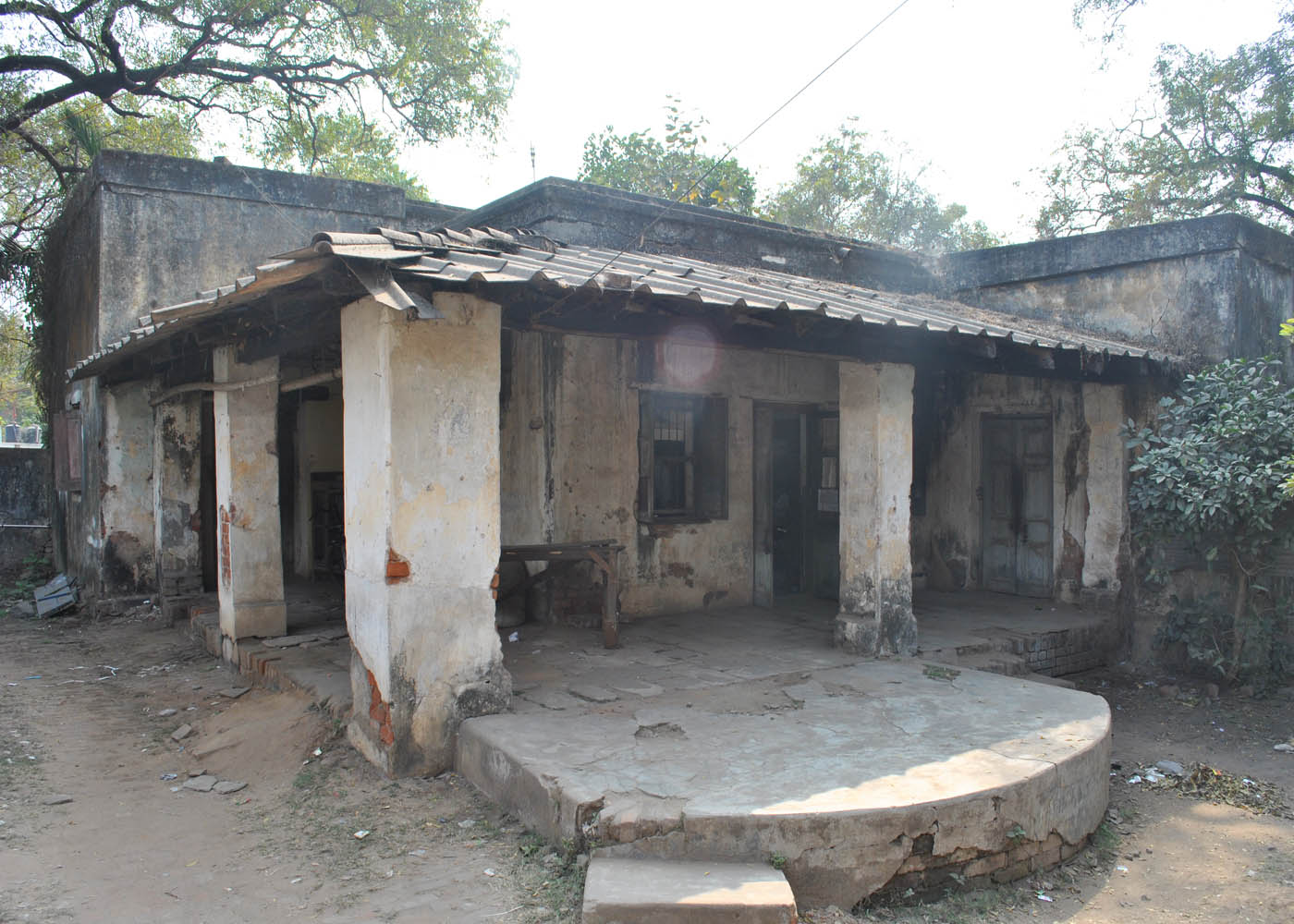
Bezbaroa resided with his family in this house, located near Mandela Chowk, Sambalpur, Odisha, from 1917 to 1937. The Government of Odisha is planning to convert this house into a museum dedicated to his life and legacy.

Bezbaroa was offered the post of Munsif by the British Government while he was still a student of Law, but he declined the offer. A few years later, he met Bholanath Barua, the manager of the prominent Guwahati-based business firm Barua-Phukan Brothers. At that time, Bholanath Barua had left his business in Guwahati and moved to Calcutta for commercial pursuits. Lakshminath and Bholanath became close friends and initially started a timber business together in Calcutta. Later, after working for a year in the office of the Ward Company in Calcutta from 1916 to 1917, Bezbaroa moved to Sambalpur in September 1917 to engage in the timber trade.

Bholanath Barua came to Calcutta with the intention of engaging in trade and became acquainted with the Calcutta timber merchant Kalikrishna Paramanik, with whom he established business relations. He built a house near Shobharam Basak Street. Around the time when his business began to prosper, Bholanath Barua met Lakshminath Bezbaroa. After accumulating some capital, they started a timber business in a forest of Singhbhum district in 1894. They also acquired a residence at a place known as Guilkora in the area.

In subsequent years, large forest leases for timber operations came under the control of Bholanath Barua. In 1900, he obtained a large forest concession from the Maharaja of Rewa. To supervise work there, he brought Mahinarayan Bora. At the same time, Barua purchased a house in Howrah and established an office there. Lakshminath Bezbaroa and Bishwanath Barua, the second son of Phatik Chandra Barua, were entrusted with managing that office.

When they began their timber business around 1893, many members of the Calcutta business community assumed that the two were brothers. Consequently, Bezbarua often wrote his name as L. B. Barua. Poet Nabakanta Barua later remarked regarding Bezbarua's timber business:

"He had two trades—one in timber and the other in words. Timber brought him temporary wealth and property, while words bestowed upon him everlasting riches. It is far more fortunate that Lakshminath became a literary luminary than a successful merchant prince."

Bholanath Barua also became acquainted with Girish Chandra Bose, who held a virtual monopoly in the teak trade, and further expanded his teak business. With Bezbaroa's association, the enterprise grew considerably. Various timber companies, including Bengal Timber of Calcutta, began investing in their ventures. Bezbaroa became fully occupied with activities such as acquiring forest leases and supervising timber extraction. However, misunderstandings arose between Bezbaroa and Bholanath Barua due to the influence of others. As a result, Bholanath withdrew from the joint business partnership in 1903. Nevertheless, their personal friendship remained largely unchanged.

After separating from Bholanath Barua, Bezbaroa established an independent business by opening a store named Assam Bengal Stores. In 1912, however, Bholanath Barua invited Bezbarua to rejoin him, and the latter accepted. In 1914, when Bholanath Barua was hospitalized following a motor accident in Delhi, Bezbaroa remained by his side. Meanwhile, the First World War had begun. The financial condition of businessmen such as Lakshminath Bezbaroa deteriorated considerably. According to his autobiography, circumstances became so difficult that he had to sell old copies of The Statesman newspaper to cover household market expenses.

In 1916, Bezbaroa joined Bird & Company in Calcutta. In 1917, on company duty, he moved with his family to Sambalpur in Odisha. Thereafter, he travelled extensively throughout Bengal, Bihar, and Odisha on company assignments. During his stay in Odisha, he developed a close friendship with the noted Assamese poet Jatindra Nath Duwara. At the time of Bholanath Barua's death in 1923, Bezbaroa visited him at his deathbed. In 1924, he returned to Calcutta from Sambalpur. In the same year, he served as President of the Asam Sahitya Sabha. In 1928, he resigned from Bird & Company and established his own business in Sambalpur. However, owing to declining health, he left Sambalpur for Assam in 1938.

== Literary career ==
Bezbaroa's literary career began while he was studying in Calcutta. During this period, he came into contact with Chandra Kumar Agarwala and Hemchandra Goswami. In an effort to restore the status of the Assamese language in Assam Province, the three, along with other Assamese students studying in Calcutta, established an organization called the Oxomiya Bhaxa Unnoti Xadhini Xobha (transl. Assamese Language Development Society). As the mouthpiece of the society, they launched a literary magazine named Jonaki in 1889. It was in the pages of Jonaki that Bezbaroa first devoted himself seriously to literary pursuits. In the first issue of the magazine's inaugural year, he published his first farce, entitled Litikai.

Thereafter, he continued to contribute extensively to every branch of Assamese literature, publishing in Jonaki as well as in virtually all major Assamese-language journals and newspapers of his time and the succeeding generations. In addition to editing Jonaki, he founded and edited the literary magazine Bãhi in 1909. It was through the pages of Bãhi that Bezbaroa reached the height of his literary maturity. Besides Bãhi, he published his creative writings in numerous contemporary newspapers and magazines, including Setona, Jonmobhumi, Milon, Oxom Xahityo Xobha Potrika, Orun, Awahon, Bordoisila, No-Jün, Joyonti, Doinik Batori, and Oxom Bonti.

Although Lakshminath Bezbaroa had been interested in literature since childhood, it was only after he moved to Calcutta for higher studies that he began to devote himself more seriously to literary activities. At that time, Calcutta was the centre of the Bengal Renaissance. Witnessing the remarkable rise of Bengali literature there inspired him to enrich the treasury of Assamese literature through his own literary endeavors. In this aspiration, he was encouraged and supported by fellow Assamese students in Calcutta, including Hemchandra Goswami and Chandrakumar Agarwala. It was through Jonaki, the magazine that they published with contributions from their own limited resources, that Bezbaroa's literary genius found its fullest expression and development.

=== Short stories ===
Lakshminath Bezbarua is widely regarded as the pioneer, and often the father, of the Assamese short story. Although many scholars have considered Konya to be his first short story, Bezbaroa's first published short story was Xeuti. Xeuti appeared in the fourth issue of the fourth year of the magazine Jonaki.

Lakshminath Bezbaroa published four collections of short stories. Three of them—Xurobhi, Xadhukothar Kũki, and Jünbiri—were published during his lifetime, while the fourth collection, Kehü̃koli, was published posthumously. Xurobhi, published in 1909, contained twelve short stories and is recognized as the first collection of Assamese short stories. Xadhukothar Kũki, published in 1910, included a total of twenty-seven short stories. Jünbiri, a collection of sixteen stories, was published in 1913.

Bezbaroa himself did not assign a title to his fourth collection of stories. In Bezbaroa Granthavali (1968), Atul Chandra Hazarika proposed that a number of previously uncollected stories, most of which had originally appeared in Bãhi, should be gathered under the title Kehü̃koli. According to Hazarika, the title was chosen in keeping with the central theme of the collection. Hridayananda Gogoi, one of the editors of Bezbaroa's collected stories, wrote:

"It would have been a matter of great fortune had Bezbaroa himself been able to compile these stories into a volume. Nevertheless, we may regard these stories as constituting the fourth volume of Bezbaroa's short fiction...."

This collection contains a total of fifteen stories by Bezbaroa.

Literary critic and translator Amritjyoti Mahanta has commented on Bezbaroa's short fiction as follows:

"In many of Bezbaroa's stories, readers encounter the author's sharp satire directed at the superficial tastes and hypocrisy that had become prevalent among sections of the Assamese middle class of his time. A notable example is the story 'Molok Guin Guin'. Similar satirical elements are also present in stories such as 'Nangaluchandra Das', 'Bhokendra Barua', and 'Amar Kaniya Xobhar Ek Odhibexon'."

Hridayananda Gogoi, editor of Bezbaroa's collected stories, further observed:

The society portrayed in Bezbarua's stories is vast in scope, extending from distant Odisha and Bengal to Assam. ... Bezbarua was a skilled craftsman, and his characters stand as testimony to that fact. ... Another notable feature of his fiction is that he blurred the boundary between folktales and short stories. He drew numerous legends and folk narratives, preserved through oral tradition, into the realm of literary storytelling. ... Bezbarua's social consciousness as a storyteller is reflected throughout many of his works.

=== Children's literature ===
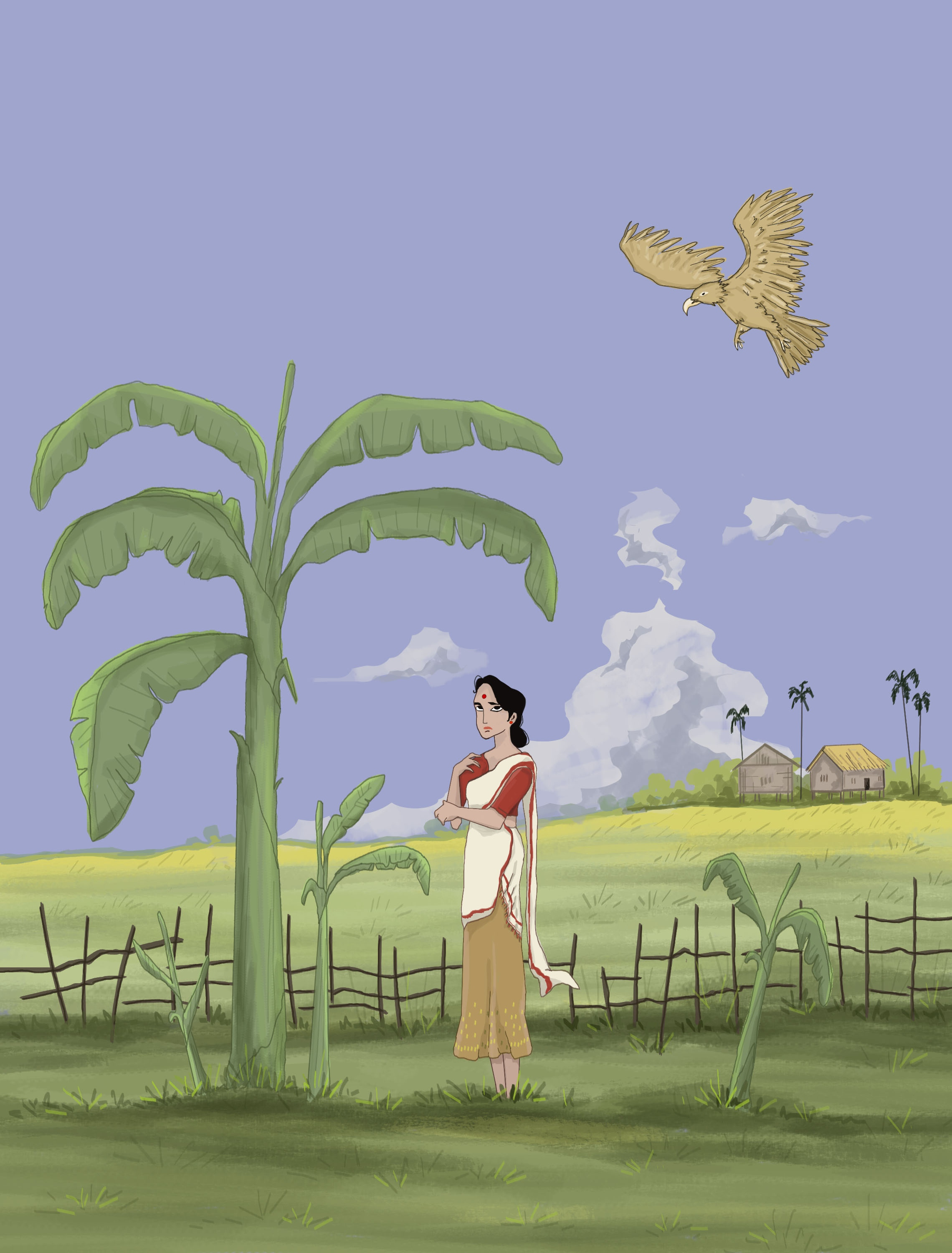
Digital artwork depicting "Silonir Jiyekor Xadhu" ("The Kite's Daughter"), one of the most popular folktales from Lakshminath Bezbarua's Burhi Aair Sadhu, by artist Bhargav Jyoti Budha Gohain.

Lakshminath Bezbaroa also collected and compiled numerous folktales suitable for children and young readers. The three collections of folktales published by him are Burhi Air Xadhu, Kokadeuta Aru Nati-Löra, and Junuka. Burhi Air Xadhu contains thirty-one tales, Kokadeuta Aru Nati-Löra contains twenty-nine, and Junuka contains ten. Burhi Air Xadhu remains equally popular to this day. The book was first published in October or November 1912. The folktales included in the volume had been collected by Bezbaroa in written form from various individuals and were subsequently compiled and published under the title Burhi Air Xadhu ("Grandmother's Tales"). Bezbarua wrote the preface to the collection in 1911.

Referring to the feminist dimensions reflected in several stories of the collection, a critic has observed:

"Several women-centered stories are included in Bezbarua's Burhi Air Xadhu. Among them are 'Mekurir Jiyekor Xadhu' ('The Cat's Daughter'), 'Ou-Kũwori', 'Tejimola', 'Silonir Jiyekor Xadhu' ('The Kite's Daughter'), 'Tula Aru Teja', 'Kata Jüwa Nak Kharoni Di Dhak', 'Panexoi', 'Lokhimi Tirüta', and 'Kansoni'. In these stories, one encounters characters such as mothers, aunts, daughters, co-wives, sisters-in-law, and mothers-in-law. A study of these characters provides valuable insight into the social structure of the period and the position and role of women within that society."

The 2016 Assamese horror-fantasy film Kothanodi, directed by Bhaskar Hazarika, is based on several popular folktales and characters from Bezbarua's Burhi Air Xadhu. The stories adapted in the film include Tejimola, Sompawoti, Ou-Kũwori, and Tawoir Xadhu.

=== Poems ===
Lakshminath Bezbarua contributed poems regularly to the literary magazines Jünaki and Bãhi. His poetry encompassed a wide range of themes and styles, including patriotism, spirituality, humor, and lyrical reflection. Bezbarua also made significant contributions to the development of Assamese Romantic poetry.

His poetry collection Kodomkoli was published in 1913 and contains forty-eight poems. The distinguished Assamese scholar Dr. Maheswar Neog described Bezbarua's poems as works that could be “preserved in gold and silver bindings.” The poem Ö Mür Apünar Dex ("O My Endearing Country"), included in Kodomkoli, was later recognized as the state anthem of Assam.

In the preface to Kodomkoli, Bezbarua wrote:

Whether these compositions deserve to be called poetry or not, I have gathered together the verses I wrote from time to time and published them in this volume. I do not cherish any ambition of becoming a poet. I enjoy reading my own writings—perhaps because they are my own. Since they were scattered in various places, it was inconvenient to consult them whenever I wished; therefore, I collected them together. The cost of printing one copy and a thousand copies is nearly the same, and so I had them printed accordingly. Those who wish may read them; those who do not may leave them unread. And whoever wishes may freely criticize and refine them to their satisfaction before the public.

Bezbarua's second collection of poetry, Podumkoli, was published posthumously in 1968 to commemorate the centenary of his birth. The volume contains twenty-eight poems. One of Bezbarua's poems contains the following lines:

...The lightning's flash, a momentary gleam of light;
The gentle radiance of the moon, the ripple of water;
The soul of the vina soaring forth in melody;
The life of the flute calling softly from the branches;
The graceful sweetness of a woman's charm;
The half-formed speech of a heavenly child...

— Lakshminath Bezbarua, Kodomkoli, Böhag, Howrah, Composed in 1832 Śaka

The eminent Assamese literary critic Dr. Hiren Gohain regarded Bezbarua's poem Binboragi as his finest poetic achievement. Commenting on the poem, he observed:

...In this poem, the various strands of thought coexisting in Bezbarua's mind are brought together in harmonious unity. Consequently, the poem's structure is intricate, subtle, and remarkably dense. The poem is completed in five sections, each embodying a distinct new idea and emotional vision...

=== Plays ===
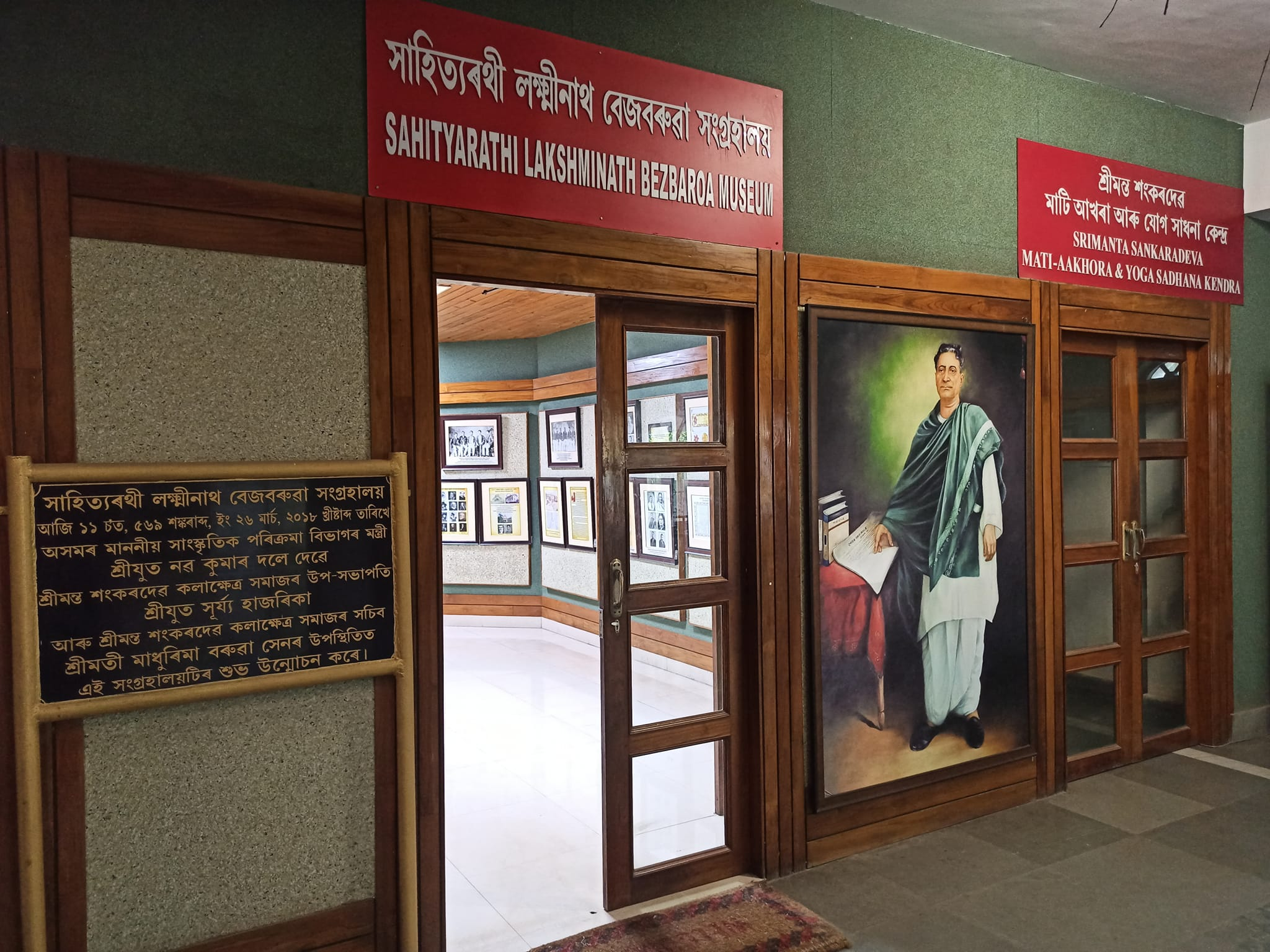
The Lakshminath Bezbarua Museum located within the Srimanta Sankardev Kalakshetra

Bezbaroa made his debut as a dramatist through Jonaki. In the very first year of the magazine, he wrote and published the play Litikai (1894). In 1913, his plays Nümol, Pãsoni, and Sikorpoti-Nikorpoti were published. Two years later, in 1915, he published three historical dramas: Joymoti Kü̃wori, Chakradhwaj Singha, and Belimar.

Lakshminath Bezbaroa's dramatic works may broadly be divided into two categories: comedies (or farces) and historical dramas. Litikai, Nümol, Pãsoni, and Shikorpoti-Nikorpoti belong to the former category. His historical dramas are Joymoti Kü̃wori, Chakradhwaj Singha, and Belimar.

In addition, Bezbaroa wrote another play entitled Ho Jo Bo Ro Lo. This play was published in the eleventh issue of the second year of Bãhi magazine in Śaka 1853 (1931 CE). The drama consists of four scenes and is a plot-driven, situation-based play.

In the preface to Chakradhwaj Singha, published in 1915 (Saka 1837), Bezbaroa wrote:

With regard to this play, it should be stated that its principal materials have been drawn from my esteemed friend Hemchandra Goswami's essay The Battle of Saraighat, published in the monthly journal Uxa. In many places, passages from that essay have been incorporated almost verbatim into this work. I remain grateful and indebted to Gosãi for granting me permission and for assisting me in the composition of this book. ... My principal objective in writing this play has been to present the glorious history of Assam before contemporary Assamese audiences in dramatic form, not to earn fame as a playwright. If fame should come as a result, so be it; if not, it matters little.

The noted literary critic Dr. Hiren Gohain commented on Chakradhwaj Singha as follows:

...In planning the scenes of the drama, Bezbaroa demonstrates the skill and maturity of an accomplished playwright, introducing sufficient variety to keep the audience engaged. At intervals, lengthy letters delivered by messengers are read aloud in royal courts or assemblies. Through these readings, the audience learns about the exchanges between opposing sides, diplomatic strategies, and preparations for war, all of which contribute significantly to the advancement of the plot. ...

=== Novels ===
Against the backdrop of the Dundiya rebellion, which took place toward the end of the eighteenth century, Bezbaroa wrote the novel Podum Kũwori in 1891. The Dundiya rebellion was an uprising in Kamrup, a region administered by the Ahom kingdom through the office of the Borphukan. During the reign of Swargadew Suklingphaa, two brothers, Hardatta and Birodatta, initiated the rebellion. With the covert support of the rulers of Cooch Behar and Bijni, they organized a force composed of Kacharis, Punjabis, and Hindustani refugees. Declaring themselves independent, they succeeded in occupying much of North Guwahati. The novel was serialized throughout the third year of the magazine Jonaki, with installments appearing in every issue. However, it was not published in book form until 1905. The novel consists of fifteen chapters (sections).

=== Comedies and satires ===
Lakshminath Bezbaroa's contribution to Assamese comedy and satirical literature is exceptional. In particular, the fictional character Kripabar Barbarua, created by him, occupies a significant place in Assamese satire. The collections of humorous and satirical writings that Bezbarua published under the pseudonym Kripabar Barbarua are collectively known as Kripabari Sahitya ("Kripabarite Literature"). Some critics have compared the humor embodied in the character of Kripabar Barbarua to that of the world's greatest humorists. Assamese writer and literary scholar Benudhar Sharma regarded Bezbaroa's social writings as among the finest examples of humorous prose in Assamese literature.

These works address a wide range of political, social, and cultural issues, including hypocrisy, women's emancipation, old-age marriage, superstition, blind imitation, and journalism. According to one critic,

Lakshminath Bezbaroa possessed a scientific and modern outlook. With a mind free from prejudice and orthodoxy, he sought to create a favorable environment for social change through humor. ... Through Kripabar Barbarua, Bezbarua clearly exposed the shortcomings, inconsistencies, and contradictions of national life.

Regarding the emergence of the character, Bezbarua wrote in his essay Kripabar Barua:

Kripabar Barbarua, the great archer;
A mighty belly, a restless head.

Vishnu bears the Sudarshana, Shiva the trident;
Mahendra his thunderbolt, Kripa his bundle of papers.

Kripa, the wish-fulfilling tree and sun of Assam's glory;
Dark of complexion, like a pot of rice upon the hearth.

Kripa, poet of fourteen realms, immersed in battle;
Recites the epic of his own life by himself.

His mother once fed him a cluster of taro roots;
Kripa daily chastises the backs of wrongdoers.

A stout staff against injustice, a water-pot for justice;
Cannabis, hemp, and rice-beer bubbling in the cauldron.

The strong-armed Barbarua thinks of others' welfare;
Unable to find proper footing, he stumbles in confusion.

In 1904, a series of humorous and satirical pieces written by Bezbaroa appeared in Jonaki under the title Kripabar Baruar Kakotor Tüpüla ("Kripabar Barua's Bundle of Papers"). In 1909, he published a volume entitled Kripabar Baruar Übhotoni. The writings collected in this volume had originally appeared in the magazines Jonaki and Uxa, published from Guwahati. Likewise, the humorous and satirical essays that Bezbaroa published in Bãhi were later collected into the books Barbaruar Buloni and Kripabar Baruar Bhawor Burburoni. He also published essay collections entitled Barbaruar Sintar Xilguti, Barbaruar Xahityik Rohosyo, and Kripabar Baruar Xamoroni.

Bezbaroa's humorous and satirical writings continue to attract considerable attention from readers and critics alike in the modern era. Praising his linguistic ingenuity and originality of expression, the critic Dr. Lilabati Saikia Borah wrote:

The principal expressive force behind Bezbarua's entire literary corpus was his extraordinary vocabulary. In addition to his rich stock of words, his use of repetition, onomatopoeia, and other linguistic devices demonstrates his exceptional command of language. Bezbarua was a master craftsman of words. Throughout his writings, the many new expressions that he coined lend his language a unique and remarkable character. Examples include Goruwali, Satoriya, Mekuritwo, Motorarühon, Niponiya Gakhir, Pokhila Löra, Pittal Manuh, Bhekurikotiya Jũjaru, and Bortüpiya Boroxun. Furthermore, his innovative use of hybrid formations (such as Messbaxi and Highcourtiya) and compound expressions (such as Podulixunga, Omorakotiya, and Püwa-Pui) clearly reveals his identity as a highly skilled linguist.

=== Biographies ===
Lakshminath Bezbaroa also made notable contributions to Assamese biographical literature. In 1909, he wrote Dangoriya Dinanath Bezbaruar Xonkhipto Jiwon Sorit, a biography of his father, Dinanath Bezbarua.

In 1911, Bezbaroa published Sri Sri Xonkordew, a biographical work that documented the life, achievements, and literary and religious contributions of the Vaishnavite saint-reformer Srimanta Sankardev. Subsequently, in 1914, he published another biographical volume entitled Sri Sri Xonkordew Aru Sri Sri Madhowdew, which dealt with the lives and legacies of both Sankardev and his successor Madhavdev.

== Personal life ==
Shortly after completing his bachelor's degree, Lakshminath Bezbaroa married Pragyasundari Devi of the Tagore family in Calcutta in 1891. Pragyasundari was the second daughter of Hemendranath Tagore, a granddaughter of Maharshi Debendranath Tagore and a niece of the Nobel laureate Bengali littérateur Rabindranath Tagore.

For some time after their marriage, Bezbaroa lived with his close friend and business associate Bholanath Barua, while Pragyasundari remained at her parental home at Jorasanko Thakur Bari. In later years, the business ventures of Bezbarua and Bholanath Barua prospered, enabling Bezbaroa to purchase a new house where he settled with his wife. Pragyasundari was the first to write a cookbook in Bengali named Amish O Niramish Ahar in three volumes which became immensely popular. She also used to edit a magazine named Punya.

In 1895, their first child, a daughter named Surabhi, was born. Tragically, she contracted diphtheria and died in 1900 at the age of five. Eighteen days after Surabhi's death, their second daughter, Aruna, was born. Their third child, Ratna, was born in 1903, followed by their fourth daughter, Deepika, in 1908. In later life, Dipika travelled to England and became a sannyasini. She returned to Assam only after the death of her father, Lakshminath Bezbaroa. Pragyasundari and Laxminath's granddaughter, Rita Devi, was a famous Odissi dancer.

== Death ==
After spending the final years of his life in various places such as Sambalpur, Baroda, Bombay, and Nagpur, Bezbaroa returned to Assam on 18 August 1937. On 26 March 1938, Lakshminath Bezbaroa passed away at the residence of his middle daughter, Ratna, in Dibrugarh.

However, his middle daughter Ratna Barua recorded the date of his death as 27 March. She mentioned this information in Lakshminath Bezbaroa, The Sahityarathi of Assam, published by Guwahati University in 1972. On the other hand, reliable information is lacking regarding who performed Bezbaroa's last rites and according to which funeral customs they were conducted.

== Influence and legacy ==
To make a nation great, certain tools are necessary. National “greatness” cannot be achieved without them. Just as no carpenter can build a grand structure without a saw, hammer, plane, chisel, and other tools, so too the construction of a great national edifice requires the saw of blood, the chisel of strength, the plane of tolerance, the nails of unity, the saw of steadfastness, the hammer of dignity, the drill of freedom from ostentation, the pegs of religious devotion, and the rivets of good conduct. The Assamese possess all these in abundance for building their national edifice. Then tell me, brother, why should the Assamese people not become a great nation? The Assamese are indeed a great nation!

— The Assamese Nation is a Great Nation by Lakshminath Bezbaroa

== Bibliography ==
Poetry collections

- Kodom-Koli (কদম-কলি; 1915)
- Podum-Koli (পদুম-কলি; 1968)

Novels

- Podum Kũwori (পদুম কুঁৱৰী; 1905)

Short story collections

- Xurobhi (সুৰভি; 1909)
- Xadhu-Kothar Kuki (সাধু-কথাৰ কুকি; 1912)
- Jün-Biri (জোন-বিৰি; 1913)
- Kehü̃koli (কেহোঁকলি; 1933)

Children's literature

- Junuka (জুনুকা; 1910)
- Burhi Air Xadhu (বুঢ়ী আইৰ সাধু; 1911)
- Kokadeuta Aru Nati-Löra (ককাদেউতা আৰু নাতি-ল’ৰা; 1912)

Satire essay collections

- Kripabar Barbaruar Kakotor Tüpüla (কৃপাবৰ বৰবৰুৱাৰ কাকতৰ টোপোলা; 1904)
- Kripabar Barbaruar Übhotoni (কৃপাবৰ বৰবৰুৱাৰ ওভতনি; 1909)
- Barbaruar Bhawor Burburoni (বৰবৰুৱাৰ ভাৱৰ বুৰবুৰণি)
- Barbaruar Buloni (বৰবৰুৱাৰ বুলনি)
- Barbaruar Sintar Xilguti (বৰবৰুৱাৰ চিন্তাৰ শিলগুটি)
- Barbaruar Xahityik Rohosyo (বৰবৰুৱাৰ সাহিত্যিক ৰহস্য)
- Kripabar Baruar Xamoroni (কৃপাবৰ বৰুৱাৰ সামৰণি)

Plays

- Litikai (লিতিকাই; 1890)
- Nümol (নোমল; 1913)
- Pãsoni (পাঁচনি; 1913)
- Sikorpoti Nikorpoti (চিকৰপতি নিকৰপতি; 1913)
- Godadhor Roja (গদাধৰ ৰজা; 1918)
- Baremtora (বাৰেমতৰা)
- Ho-Jo-Bo-Ro-Lo (হ-য-ব-ৰ-ল)
- Hamlet (হেমলেত)
- Mongola (মঙলা)
- Joymoti Kũwori (জয়মতী কুঁৱৰী; 1915)
- Sokrodhwoj Xingho (চক্ৰধ্বজ সিংহ; 1915)
- Belimar (বেলিমাৰ; 1915)

Biographies and autobiographies

- Dangoriya Dinanath Bezbaruar Xonkhipto Jiwon-Sorit (ডাঙৰীয়া দীননাথ বেজবৰুৱাৰ সংক্ষিপ্ত জীৱন-চৰিত; 1909)
- Xonkordew (শংকৰদেৱ; 1911)
- Sri Sri Xonkordew Aru Sri Sri Madhowdew (শ্ৰীশ্রীশংকৰদেৱ আৰু শ্ৰীশ্রীমাধৱদেৱ)
- Mür Ziwon Xü̃woron Volume I (মোৰ জীৱন সোঁৱৰণ প্ৰথম ভাগ; 1945)
- * Mür Ziwon Xü̃woron Volume II (মোৰ জীৱন সোঁৱৰণ দ্বিতীয় ভাগ; 1961)
- Potrolekha, Dinolekha (পত্ৰলেখা, দিনলেখা)

Philosophical writings

- Bhagowot Kotha (ভাগৱত কথা)
- Tottwo-Kotha (তত্ত্ব-কথা)
- Srikrisnokotha (শ্ৰীকৃষ্ণকথা)

Self-help writings

- Kamot Krititwo Lobhibor Xonket (কামত কৃতিত্ব লভিবৰ সংকেত; 1903)
- Bakhor (বাখৰ; 1915)

Others

- Oxomiya Bhaxa Aru Xahityo (অসমীয়া ভাষা আৰু সাহিত্য)
- Xobhapotir Odhibexon (সভাপতিৰ অধিবেশন; 1946)
- Kahudi Aru Kharoli (কাহুদি আৰু খাৰলি; 1950)
- Xompadokor Söra (সম্পাদকৰ চ’ৰা)

English writings

- History of Vaishnavism in India
- Rasalila of Sri Krishna (The Baroda Lectures, 1934)
- The Religion of Love and Devotion (1968), including the Boroda lectures and two other essays

Translations

- Bharotborxor Buronji (ভাৰতবৰ্ষৰ বুৰঞ্জী)

As editor

- Bãhi (বাঁহী)

== Awards and honours ==
Bezbarua was conferred the unique title of Rasarāj (lit. 'King of Humour') by the Asam Sahitya Sabha at its Sivasagar session on 29 December 1931. In the felicitation address presented on that occasion, the title Sāhityarathī (lit. 'Charioteer of Literature') was used for the first time in reference to Bezbarua. The title Rasarāj recognizes his immensely popular satirical writings published under the pen name "Kripabar Barbarua", a fictional persona he created and portrayed as the central character in many of his works. He was also widely known in the literary circles as Sāhityarathī, a title bestowed in recognition of his mastery across diverse branches of literature.

He was the founding president of the Oxom Satro Xonmilon (Assam Students' Association) at Latasil, Guwahati in 1916. He presided over the All-Assam Students' Conference at Guwahati in 1921.

He presided over the 7th annual session of Asam Sahitya Sabha held at Guwahati in 1924.

He died in Dibrugarh on 26 March at the age of seventy-four only a few months after he went back to live in Assam permanently. The Asam Sahitya Sabha annually observes this day as Sahitya Diwas.

== See also ==
- List of Indian poets
- O Mur Apunar Dekh
- Assamese literature
- Jonaki (magazine)
- Assamese Language Movement
- List of Assamese writers with their pen names
