= Atul Chandra Barua =

- Born: 29 May 1916; Dubahati, Darrang, Assam Province, British India (present-day Assam, India)
- Died: 25 December 2001 (aged 85); Guwahati, Assam, India
- Education: Cotton College
- Alma mater: Calcutta University
- Occupations: ACS officer and Writer
- Spouse: Hiran Prabha Barua
- Children: Pradip Baruah, Dilip Baruah, Rajib Baruah, Minati Hazarika; Sewali Bora
- Relatives: Bhogram Barua (father) and Pramila Barua (mother)
- Writing career
- Language: Assamese

Atul Chandra Barua (29 May 1916 – 25 December 2001) was the 46th president of Asam Sahitya Sabha and a prominent name in the modern Assamese literature. He was an ACS officer and an Assamese writer. He worked for the cause of Darrangi culture and was conferred with the title "Darrang Ratna".

== Early life ==
Atul Chandra Barua as born on 29 May 1916 to Bhogram Barua and Pramila Barua in the village of Maroigaon (Dubahati) in Darrang district, Assam.

== Education ==
In the year 1924, he was the student from Maroigaon Primary School who topped the Darrang Scholarship exam when he was studying in third grade. He received the Khagendra Narayan award when he topped the Assam Scholarship Exam as he was at the sixth standard of Patharighat High School. He passed his matriculation exam from Mangaldoi Govt School by holding 1st division and got letter marks in two subjects in the year 1936. In the year 1940, he passed the B.A. exam from Cotton College. For further education, he went to Calcutta University to acquire an M.A. degree. He passed M.A. in 2nd class 1st, place in, the year 1944.

== Personal life ==
Atul Chandra Barua married Hiran Prabha Barua in the year 1947.

== Career ==
After completing his studies started imparting education to the students in various institutions like Sipajhar High School, Mangaldai High School Pat, Harighat ME School, Kamrup Academy High School (now a senior secondary school), St Mary's College and St Edmund's College in Shillong in Meghalaya (then in Assam) etc. at various times. He also rendered his services in the Assam Secretariat in Shillong from 1943 to 1947. In independent India app, earing in the Assam Civil Service Examination held in 1949 for the first lime, he stood second in rank to bag a post of sub-deputy collector. He was appointed Assistant Deputy Commissioner of Rangia from 1953 to 1958. In 1958, he was appointed P.A. of the commissioner in Shillong, i.e., the capital of Assam at that time. He was transferred to Tezpur for the post of S.D.O. in 1969, and he worked there till 1971. He was also appointed Managing Director of Apexthe Marketing Society in the year 1971. He worked as an M.D. for two years. He was again appointed as assistant deputy commissioner. He worked as an ADC for two years. He was retired after that tenure as A.D.C. in the year 1974.

== 46th President of Asam Sahitya Sabha ==
In the session of 1979 of Asam Sahitya Sabha, Atul Chandra Barua served as the 46th President in Session 1979–80 held in Sualkuchi.

== Retirement and afterwards ==
In bringing fructification to the project of the Singhapurush Radha Govinda Baruah, the Nehru Stadium, Atul Chandra Barua played an important role in the matter of allotment of the plot of land for the purpose. He was also behind the establishment of the Ambikagiri Sishu Udyan at Nabagiri Road in Chandmari. Atul Chandra Barua also established the socio-literary organisation Mukul Sangha in Shillong. In 1950, he formed the Jironi Melit's founder and second secretary. The Guwahati Alochoua Chakra established by him in 1955 is now a very prominent one and holds meetings on a regular basis. Atul Chandra Barua also wrote and published more than 30 books, besides editing about 15 literary and socially relevant journals and magazines, including two vernacular dictionaries, of which Chalanta Abhidhan was also jointly edited by Dr Maheswar Neog, Kirtinath Hazarika, etc. The first book named ‘Sarad Chandra Goswamir Samu Jiboni', was published in the year 1946. Some others were ‘Purani Puthir Sadu’ (1'51"), ‘Sahitya Ruprekha' (1957), ‘Ulat-Palat’ (1957), ‘Nabi Katha' (1963), and Ojapali: Its Different Types and Functions (1982). Atul Chandra Barua undertookresearch in the field of the culture of Darrang, which is termed 'Darrangi Kala Kristi', and for his service, he was conferred with the title 'Darrang Ratna'. He dedicated his post-retirement life to the cause of Darrangi culture until he died. As an administrator, Atul Chandra Barua could worked for the future of Guwahati city even during the 50s and 60s.Atul Chandra Barua was elected the president of the Sabha in 1979 at a time when Assam was facing a difficult phase. In the session of 1979 of Asam Sahitya Sabha Atul Chandra Barua served as the 46th President in Session 1979-80 held in Sualkuchi, Atul Chandra Barua, as its president, played a very significant role in steering the organisation to be the saviour of Assamese society by protecting and preserving the art, culture, literature and language to stand alone as a unique part of India. Under his able and visionary leadership, the Assam Sahitya Sabha also became a great force to be reckoned with in moving the historic six-year-long Assam Agitation, spearheaded by the All Assam Students' Union (AASU), to reach the destination successfully. During his presidency and afterwards too, Atul Chandra Barua maintained good rapport with the society and various factions of the greater Assamese culture to forge unity amongst all the people of Assam irrespective of caste, culture, creed, religion, ethnicity, etc. Prafulla Chandra Barua wrote a cheque in the name of Atul Chandra Barua as a donation for the construction of the Lakhiram Barua Sadan in Guwahati. Moreover, his contribution in garnering financial aid for construction of the Radha Nath Handiqui Bhawan at Jorhat is also remembered by everyone. The relentless and silent deeds of Atul Chandra Barua for the all-round development of Assam would remain ingrained in the public mind for years to come.

== Literary works ==
- Sarad Chandra Goswamir Samu Jiboni (1946)
- Purani Puthir Sadu (1951)
- Sahitya Ruprekha (1957)
- Ulat-Palat (1957)
- Nabi Katha (1963)
- Ojapali, its Different type and Functions (1982)

== Death ==
Atul Chandra Barua died on 25 December 2001.
