= List of lingua francas =

This is a list of lingua francas. A lingua franca is a language systematically used to make communication possible between people not sharing a first language, in particular when it is a third language, distinct from both speakers' first languages.

Examples of lingua francas are numerous and exist on every continent. The most utilized modern example is English, which is the current dominant lingua franca of international diplomacy, business, science, technology and aviation, but many other languages serve, or have served at different historical periods, as lingua francas in particular regions, countries, or in special contexts.

== Africa ==
=== Akan ===
Akan can be regarded as the main lingua franca of Ghana, although mainly in the south.

=== Afrikaans ===
During apartheid, the South African government aimed to establish Afrikaans as the primary lingua franca in South Africa and South African-controlled South-West Africa (now Namibia), although English was also in common use. Since the end of apartheid, English has been widely adopted as the sole lingua franca even though it was replaced with a new language. Many institutions that had names in English and Afrikaans have since dropped the Afrikaans names. Notable cases are South African Airways and the South African Broadcasting Corporation.

In Namibia, Afrikaans holds a more universal role than in South Africa, across ethnic groups and races and is the spoken lingua franca in the capital Windhoek and throughout most of central and southern Namibia. There are pockets where German is commonly spoken. English is the sole official language.

=== Amharic ===
Amharic is the primary lingua franca used in major cities and towns across Ethiopia.

=== Arabic ===
There are more Arabic speakers in Africa than in Asia. It is spoken as an official language in all of the continent's Arab League states. Arabic is also spoken as a trade language across the Sahara as far as the Sahel, including parts of Mali, Chad and Borno State in Nigeria. Varieties and Arabic-based pidgins function as the lingua francas of Sudan (Sudanese Arabic), Chad (Chadian Arabic; mainly in the northern half of the country), and South Sudan (Juba Arabic; mainly the Equatoria region). Sudan has a majority of people that speak Arabic natively and minorities that speak various other languages in addition to Arabic, while native Arabic speakers are a significant minority in Chad and a very small minority in South Sudan.

=== Ewondo ===
Ewondo is a lingua franca used in Cameroon's Centre Region, including the capital Yaounde, often in a pidginized form known as Ewondo Populaire. However, Cameroon is one of the African countries where French is most widely spread, and Ewondo's status may be coming under threat. Ewondo is mutually intelligible with Fang, which is the main language of the neighboring Río Muni mainland of Equatorial Guinea, as well as a major language of Gabon.

=== Fanagalo ===
Fanagalo or Fanakalo is a pidgin based on the Zulu, English, and Afrikaans languages. It was used as a lingua franca mainly in the mining industries in South Africa, however, in this role, it is being increasingly eclipsed by English which is viewed as being more neutral politically.

=== Fon ===
Fon is regarded as the lingua franca of the southern third of Benin, which is the most densely populated area and includes the largest cities and the national capital.

=== Fula ===
Fula (Fula: Fulfulde or Pulaar or Pular, depending on the region; French: Peul) the language of the Fula people or Fulani (Fula: Fulɓe; French: Peuls) and associated groups such as the Toucouleur. Fula is spoken in all countries directly south of the Sahara (such as Cameroon, Chad, Nigeria, Niger, Mali...). It is spoken mainly by Fula people, but is also used as a lingua franca by several populations of various origins, throughout Western Africa. One region where it is particularly important as a link language is the Adamawa Plateau of northern Cameroon, which, although largely populated by non-Fula people, was united and ruled by Fula conquerors prior to colonial rule. Fula is also the main lingua franca of the Sahel Region of Burkina Faso.

=== Hausa ===
Hausa is widely spoken throughout Nigeria and Niger and recognised in neighbouring states such as Ghana, Benin, and Cameroon. The reason for this is that Hausa people used to be traders who led caravans with goods (cotton, leather, slaves, food crops etc.) through the whole West African region, from the Niger Delta to the Atlantic shores at the very west edge of Africa. They also reached North African states through Trans-Saharan routes. Thus trade deals in Timbuktu in modern Mali, Agadez, Ghat, Fez in Northern Africa, and other trade centers were often concluded in Hausa. Today, Hausa is the most widely spoken language in West Africa; although its speakers are mainly concentrated in the traditional Hausa heartland, it functions as the lingua franca of Nigeria's multilingual Middle Belt, including the capital of Abuja, and is also widely spoken and understood in other countries, especially northern Ghana, both because of Hausa settlement in other areas, and the influence of Hausa media.

=== Kanuri ===
Kanuri has historically been an important lingua franca around the Lake Chad region due to its association with the powerful Kanem-Borno empire. However, since the creation of the modern nation-states of Nigeria and Niger, it has declined somewhat in prestige, due to the expansion of the populous Hausa language.

=== Kituba ===
A pidgin based on the Kongo language which originated when Belgian colonists enlisted West African labor to help build a local railroad, Kituba is used in the southern half of the Republic of the Congo and the Kwilu and Kwango provinces in the Democratic Republic of the Congo.

=== Krio ===
The Krio language of the Sierra Leone Creole people is the lingua franca and de facto national language of Sierra Leone spoken by 96% of the country's population. Krio is distinct from West African Pidgin English and is strongly influenced by British English, Gullah, African American Vernacular English, Jamaican Creole, Akan, Igbo and Yoruba.

=== Lingala ===
Lingala is used by over 10 million speakers throughout the northwestern part of the Democratic Republic of the Congo and a large part of the Republic of the Congo, as well as to some degree in Angola and the Central African Republic, although it has only about two million native speakers. Its status is comparable to that of Swahili in eastern Africa.

Between 1880 and 1900, the colonial administration, in need of a common language for the region, adopted a simplified form of Bobangi, the language of the Bangala people, which became Lingala. Spoken Lingala has many loanwords from French, inflected with Lingala affixes.

=== Lozi ===
The Lozi language is a lingua franca in Zambia.

=== Manding ===
The largely interintelligible Manding languages of West Africa serve as lingua francas in various places. For instance Bambara is the most widely spoken language in Mali, and Jula (almost the same as Bambara) is commonly used in western Burkina Faso and northern Côte d'Ivoire; these two varieties are especially closely related and mutually intelligible, whereas other varieties may present more difficulties. Manding languages have long been used in regional commerce, so much so that the word for trader, jula, was applied to the language currently known by the same name. Other varieties of Manding are used in several other countries, such as Guinea, The Gambia, and Senegal.

=== Mende ===
Mende is a regional lingua franca of southeastern Sierra Leone, although almost the entire population speaks the Krio language.

=== Ngambay ===
Ngambay is an important lingua franca of southwestern Chad, covering areas where Chadian Arabic is not as widespread. It is the most important of the Sara languages and may be used by speakers of other varieties.

=== Sango ===
The Sango language is a lingua franca developed for intertribal trading in the Central African Republic. It is based on the Northern Ngbandi language spoken by the Sango people of the Democratic Republic of the Congo but with a large vocabulary of French loan words. It has now been institutionalised as an official language of the Central African Republic.

=== Sar ===
Sar is the lingua franca of the city of Sarh in Chad and surrounding areas, although not as widespread as Ngambay.

=== Swahili ===
Swahili, known as Kiswahili to its speakers, is used throughout large parts of East Africa and the eastern Democratic Republic of the Congo as a lingua franca, despite being the mother tongue of a relatively small ethnic group on the East African coast and nearby islands in the Indian Ocean. Swahili is also one of the working languages of the African Union and officially recognised as a lingua franca of the East African Community. At least as early as the late 18th century, Swahili was used along trading and slave routes that extended west across Lake Tanganyika and into the present-day Democratic Republic of Congo. Swahili rose in prominence throughout the colonial era, and has become the predominant African language of Tanzania and Kenya. Some ethnic groups now speak Swahili more often than their mother tongues, and many, especially in urban areas, choose to raise their children with Swahili as their first language, leading to the possibility that several smaller East African languages will fade away as Swahili transitions from being a regional lingua franca to a regional first language.

It has official status as a national language in DR Congo, Tanzania and Kenya, and symbolic official status (understood but not widely spoken) in Uganda, Rwanda and Burundi. It is the first language of education in Tanzania and in much of eastern Congo. It is also the auxiliary language to be in the proposed East African Federation.

=== Temne ===
Temne is a regional lingua franca of northwestern Sierra Leone, although almost the entire population speaks the Krio language.

=== West African Pidgin English ===
West African Pidgin English is used by an estimated 75 million people across coastal West Africa, mainly as a second language. It is used in Nigeria, where it functions as something close to a national lingua franca (Nigerian Pidgin, as well as Ghana (Ghanaian Pidgin English) and Cameroon (Cameroonian Pidgin English), mainly the two anglophone regions. Closely related languages are used as lingua francas in Sierra Leone (Krio), Liberia (Liberian Kreyol) and Bioko island of Equatorial Guinea (Pichinglis).

=== Wolof ===
Wolof is a widely spoken lingua franca of Senegal and The Gambia (especially the capital, Banjul). It is the native language of approximately 5 million Wolof people in Senegal and is spoken as a second language by an equal number.

=== Yoruba ===
By the advent of European contact and commercial activities in the region, Yoruba (or Lukumi, Lucumi, or Alkomij) was the lingua franca of the coast of the Bight of Biafra and elsewhere in present-day southern Nigeria. Some non-Yoruba kingdoms recorded that enforced its usage as a prestige language include the Aja kingdom of Ardra.

== Asia ==
=== Akkadian ===
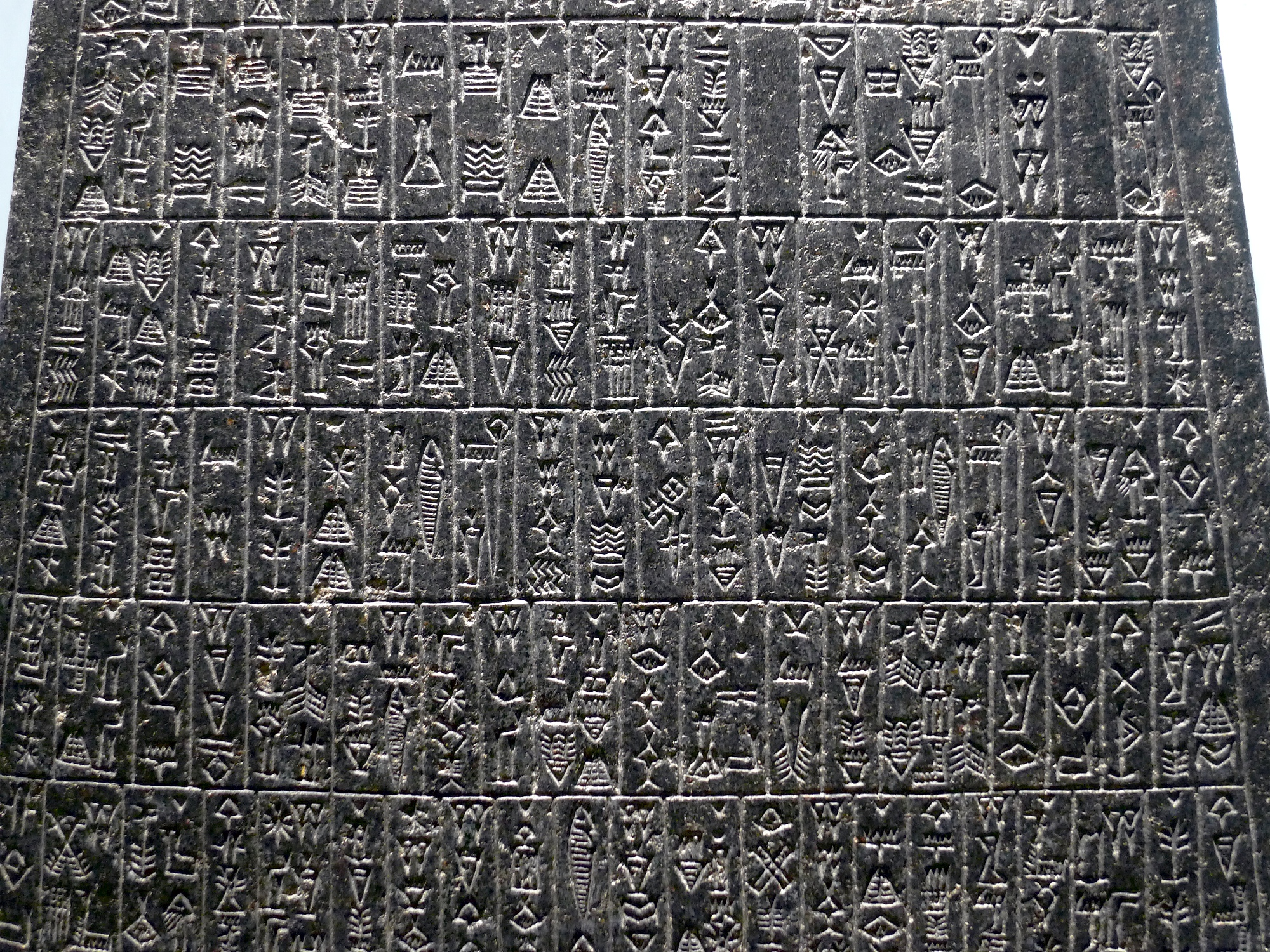
Akkadian language inscription on the obelisk of Manishtushu

In the Middle East, from around the 24th century BC to the 8th century BC, forms of Akkadian were the universally recognized language. It was used throughout the Akkadian Empire, as well as later states such as Assyria and Babylon. It was also used as internationally as a diplomatic language – for example between Egypt and Babylon – well after the fall of the Akkadian Empire itself and even while Aramaic was more common in Babylon, beginning from the 8th century BC. Akkadian eventually lost its primacy and became extinct by the 1st century AD.

=== Arabic ===
An example of a text written in Arabic calligraphy

Arabic, the native language of the Arabs, who originally came from the Arabian Peninsula, became the lingua franca of the Islamic (Arab) Empire (from CE 733 – 1492), which at its greatest extent was bordered by China and Northern India, Central Asia, Persia, Asia Minor, the Middle East, North Africa, France and Portugal.

During the Islamic Golden Age (around CE 1200), Arabic was the language of science and diplomacy. Arabic loanwords are found in many languages, including English, Persian, Turkish, Hindustani, Somali, Spanish, Portuguese and Swahili. In Iberia, this is a legacy of the Al-Andalus period. Additionally, Arabic was used by people neighbouring the Abbasid Caliphate.

Arabic script was adopted by many other languages such as Urdu, Persian, Swahili (changed to Latin in the late 19th century), Turkish (switched to Latin script in 1928), and Somali (changed to Latin in 1972). Arabic became the lingua franca of these regions not simply because of commerce or diplomacy, but also on religious grounds since Arabic is the language of the Qur'an, Islam's holy book, sacred to Muslims. Arabic remains the lingua franca for 23 countries (24 with Palestine), in the Middle East, North Africa, Horn of Africa, in addition to Chad and Eritrea. Despite a few language script conversions from Arabic to Latin as just described, Arabic is the second most widely used alphabetic system in the world after Latin. Arabic script is/has been used in languages including Afrikaans, Azeri, Belarusian, Bosnian, Bengali, Hausa, Kashmiri, Kazakh, Kurdish, Kyrgyz, Malay, Morisco, Pashto, Persian, Punjabi, Sindhi, Somali, Tatar, Turkish, Turkmen, Urdu, Uyghur, and Uzbek.

According to Encarta, which classified Chinese as a single language, Arabic is the second largest native language. Used by more than a billion Muslims around the world, it is also one of the six official languages of the United Nations.

=== Aramaic ===
Aramaic was the native language of the Aramaeans and became the lingua franca of the Neo-Assyrian Empire and the western provinces of the Persian Empire, and was adopted by conquered peoples such as the Hebrews. A dialect of Old Aramaic developed into the literary language Syriac. Groups of Syriac rite Christians, particularly the Assyrian people, continued the use of Aramaic in religious services, while developing a spoken vernacular which ultimately evolved into the Neo-Aramaic dialects of the Middle East. The most common Neo-Aramaic dialects of Assyrian Christians today are Sureth and Turoyo, with Turoyo primarily used by adherents of the Syriac Orthodox Church, and Sureth used by ACOE and Chaldean Catholic communities.

Maronites from Lebanon historically had their own distinct Western Aramaic dialect known as Lebanese Aramaic. The dialect has since gone extinct, with the last known speakers believed to have passed away in the 19th century, by which point Arabic had become the dominant language of Lebanon.

=== Assamese ===
The Assamese language serves as lingua franca among different communities in Assam, as well as in adjacent areas of Arunachal Pradesh, Nagaland and Meghalaya. Though Assam has well over 20 different tribes with their own unique languages, along with different dialects of Assamese itself, nearly every community uses Assamese as medium of communication with someone from other community within the state. Historically, the whole northeast region was connected through Assam with the rest of India, and also during colonial times the entire Northeast region was made a single state, hence Assamese become lingua franca within the communities of present day Assam and its bordering areas.

Two other lingue franche based on Assamese, Nagamese and Nefamese, still exist today in Nagaland and Arunachal Pradesh respectively.

=== Azerbaijani ===
Azerbaijani served as a lingua franca in Transcaucasia (except the Black Sea coast), Southern Daghestan, Eastern Anatolia, and all Iran including Iranian Azerbaijan from the 16th century to the early 20th century. Its role has now been taken over by Russian in the North Caucasus and by the official languages of the various independent states of the South Caucasus.

=== Bengali ===
The Bengali language acts as a lingua franca for the entire Bengal region (Bangladesh and West Bengal). While there are other languages spoken throughout Bengal that are not necessarily mutually intelligible with Standard Bangla, like Chittagongian and Sylheti, Standard Bangla is a second language for these communities and a link language between them and other groups in the country.

=== Hebrew ===
Throughout the centuries of Jewish exile, Hebrew has served the Jewish people as a lingua franca; allowing Jews from different areas of the world to communicate effectively with one another. This was particularly valuable for cross-culture mercantile trading which became one of the default occupations held by Jews in exilic times. Without the need for translators, documents could easily be written up to convey significant legal trade information. Among early Zionists, a newly reconstructed form of Hebrew served as a common language between Jews from nations as diverse as Poland and Yemen. In modern Israel, Hebrew is the commonly accepted language of administration and trade, even among Palestinian citizens of Israel whose mother tongue remains Arabic.

=== Hindustani ===
Hindustani, or Hindi–Urdu, is commonly spoken in the northern part of India and Pakistan. It encompasses two standardized registers, Hindi and Urdu, as well as several nonstandard dialects. Hindi and Urdu are constitutionally recognized official languages in India, and Urdu is the national language and lingua franca of Pakistan. While the two registers differ in formal vocabulary (Hindi drawing from Sanskrit and Urdu drawing from Arabic and Persian) and writing system (Hindi in Devanagari and Urdu in Nastaliq), the spoken language is largely indistinguishable and uses many loan words from English instead of Arabic or Sanskrit. This so-called "bazaar Hindustani" has been popularized through regional consumption of Bollywood films and is widely understood in regions where Hindi and Urdu are not indigenous, such as some parts of Northeast India.

Hindi has emerged as a lingua franca for the locals of Arunachal Pradesh, a linguistically diverse state in Northeast India. It is estimated that 90 percent of the state's population knows Hindi. A variety known as Haflong Hindi is widely used in the Dima Hasao district.

Hindi is also understood by a large number of people in Nepal. In the Terai i.e. floodplain districts of Nepal (along the Indian border), Hindi is a dominant language, though the people's mother tongues are typically Awadhi, Maithili, or Bhojpuri. Additionally, Hindustani (both Hindi-Urdu) is quite useful throughout the Middle East countries such as UAE due to the export of labor from South Asia. It is quite commonly spoken among labour working populations on land and at sea throughout the Arabian Gulf countries.

=== Indonesian ===
Indonesian, a standardized variety of Malay, serves as a lingua franca throughout Indonesia and East Timor (where it is considered a working language), areas that are home to over 700 indigenous languages.

=== Korean ===
Koryo-mar, a Korean dialect, was a lingua franca in Central Asia during the Soviet period.

=== Lao ===
Lao is spoken natively by only around half of the population of Laos, and the remainder of the population speaks unrelated languages such as Hmong or Khmu. However, Lao serves as the lingua franca throughout the country.

=== Malay ===
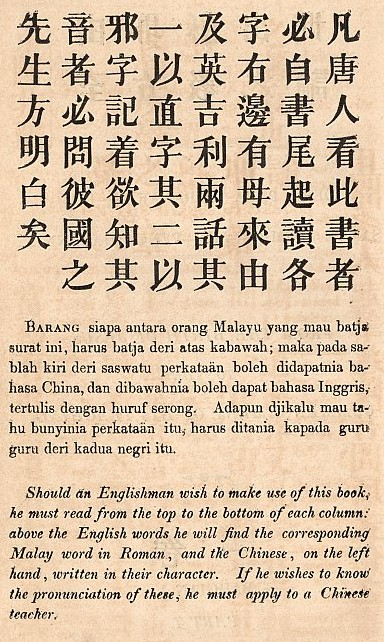
1839 – Trilingual Chinese-Malay-English text – Malay was the lingua franca across the Strait of Malacca, including the coasts of the Malay Peninsula of Malaysia and the eastern coast of Sumatra in Indonesia.

In the 15th century, during the Malacca Sultanate, Malay was the lingua franca of Maritime Southeast Asia, encompassing the present-day countries of Malaysia, Indonesia, Brunei, the Philippines, and East Timor, developing creoles and trade varieties across the region. Dutch scholar Francois Valentijn (1666–1727) described the use of Malay in the region as being equivalent to the contemporary use of Latin and French in Europe.

Malay is currently used primarily in Malaysia (as Malaysian) and Brunei, and to a lesser extent in Singapore, parts of Sumatra and in the deep south of Thailand. One of Singapore's four official languages, the Malay language or 'Bahasa Melayu' was the lingua franca for Singapore prior to the introduction of English as a working and instructional language, and remains so for the elder generation.

=== Mandarin ===
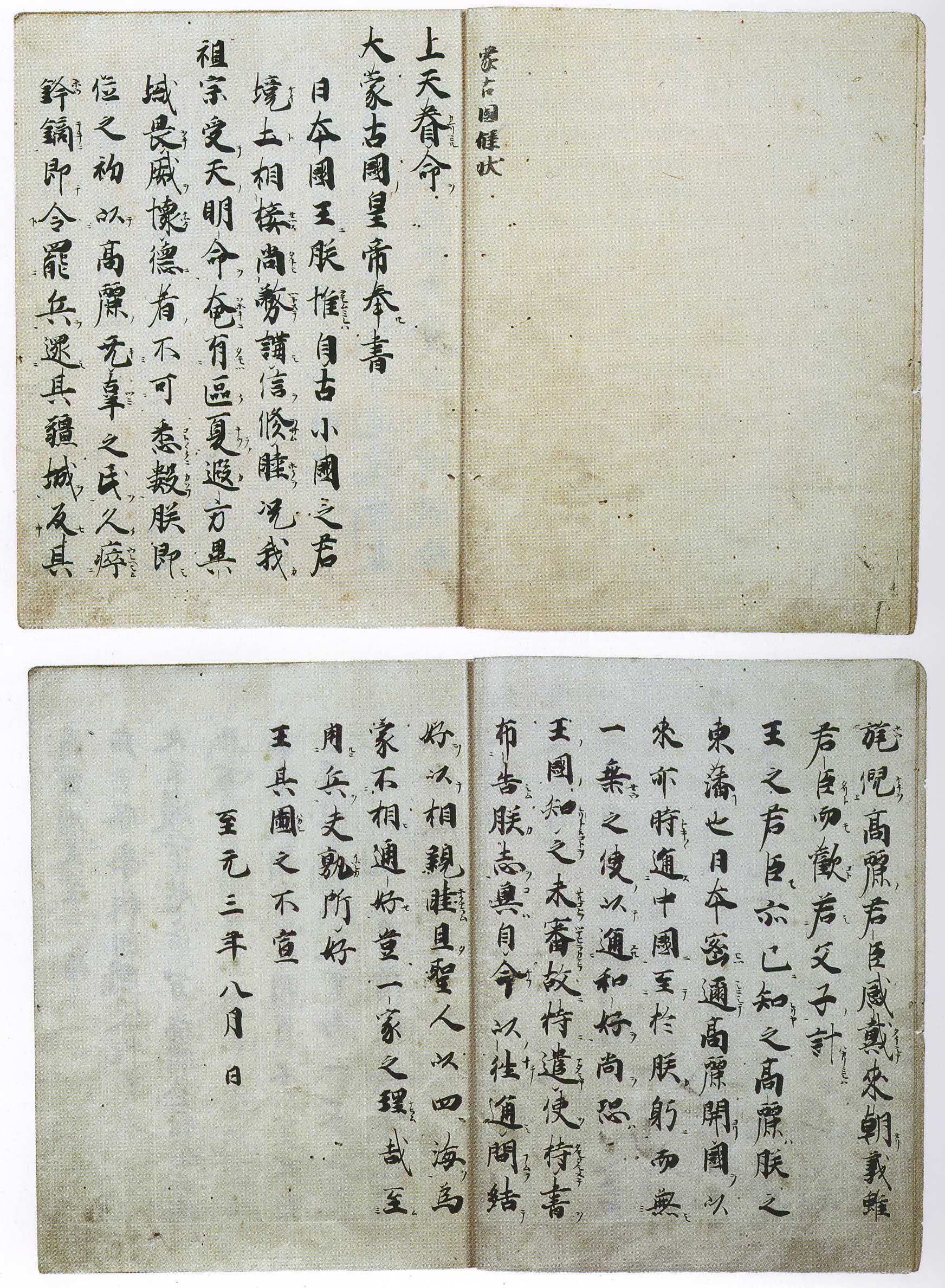
A letter dated 1266 from Kublai Khan of the Mongol Empire to the "King of Japan" (日本國王) was written in Classical Chinese. Now stored in Todai-ji, Nara, Japan.

Until the early 20th century, Classical Chinese served as both the written lingua franca and the diplomatic language in Far East Asia including China, Mongolia, Korea, Japan, Taiwan, the Ryūkyū Kingdom, and Vietnam. In the early 20th century, vernacular written Chinese replaced Classical Chinese within China as both the written and spoken lingua franca for speakers of different Chinese dialects, and because of the declining power and cultural influence of China in East Asia, English has since replaced Classical Chinese as the lingua franca in East Asia. Today, Standard Chinese is the lingua franca of mainland China and Taiwan, which are home to many mutually unintelligible varieties of Chinese. It is also used as a lingua franca and language of education among various Chinese diaspora communities, particularly in Southeast Asia.

=== Meitei ===
Meitei language (officially known as Manipuri language), besides being one of the 22 official languages of India, is the lingua franca of Manipur, southern Assam and many parts of Nagaland, in which different ethno-linguistically diverse groups of people communicate one another.

=== Nagamese ===
Nagamese Creole, which is based on Assamese, is the most widely spoken language and lingua franca of the Indian state of Nagaland, where the indigenous Naga people have several mutually unintelligible languages.

=== Nefamese ===
Nefamese is a pidgin that was once the main lingua franca of the Indian state of Arunachal Pradesh, although it has been increasingly replaced by Hindi.

=== Nepali ===
Nepali is the lingua franca of the many ethnic, religious and cultural communities of Nepal, and is also spoken in Bhutan, parts of India and parts of Myanmar (Burma). It is one of 23 official languages of India incorporated in the 8th annex of the Indian Constitution. It has official language status in the formerly independent state of Sikkim and in West Bengal's Darjeeling district. Similarly, it is spoken by the Nepalese living in the state of Assam and other Northeast Indian states. While Nepali is closely related to the Hindi–Urdu complex and is mutually intelligible to a degree, it has more Sanskritic derivations and fewer Persian or English loan words. Nepali is commonly written in the Devanagari script, as are Hindi, Sanskrit and Marathi.

=== Persian ===
Persian became the second lingua franca of the Islamic world, in particular of the eastern regions. Besides serving as the state and administrative language in many Islamic dynasties, some of which included Samanids, Ghurids, Ghaznavids, Ilkhanids, Seljuqids, Mughals and early Ottomans, Persian cultural and political forms, and often the Persian language, were used by the cultural elites from the Balkans to Bangladesh. For example, Persian was the only oriental language known and used by Marco Polo at the Court of Kublai Khan and in his journeys through China. Arnold Joseph Toynbee's assessment of the role of the Persian language is worth quoting in more detail:

In the Iranic world, before it began to succumb to the process of Westernization, the New Persian language, which had been fashioned into literary form in mighty works of art ... gained a currency as a lingua franca; and at its widest, about the turn of the 16th and 17th centuries of the Christian Era, its range in this role extended, without a break, across the face of South-Eastern Europe and South-Western Asia.

Persian remains the lingua franca in Iran, Afghanistan and Tajikistan.

=== Sadri ===
Sadri, also known as Nagpuri, is a Bihari-group language that functions as the lingua franca of the linguistically diverse Chota Nagpur plateau in India, mainly in the state of Jharkhand. It is frequently used between tribes who have different mother tongues. Some linguists e.g. Dey (http://hdl.handle.net/10603/9001) state that Sadri is a creolised pidgin arising from contact between speakers of Austro-Asiatic, Indo-Aryan and Dravidian languages; but Brill (https://brill.com/view/journals/ldc/12/2/article-p224_2.xml) disagrees, asserting that "there are no signs whatsoever that Sadri ever was a pidgin language... there are no indications that Sadri ever went through a period of pidginization or creolization."

=== Sanskrit ===
Sanskrit historically served as a lingua franca throughout the majority of India.

=== Sant Bhasha ===
Sant Bhasha (lit. Saint language) was a medieval lingua franca in northern India that was used as a method of communication by Sikh gurus.

=== Sogdian ===
Sogdian was used to facilitate trade between those who spoke different languages along the Silk Road, which is why native speakers of Sogdian were employed as translators in Tang China. The Sogdians also ended up circulating spiritual beliefs and texts, including those of Buddhism and Christianity, thanks to their ability to communicate to many people in the region through their native language.

=== Tagalog ===
Tagalog was declared the official language in 1897 by the first constitution in the Philippines, the Constitution of Biak-na-Bato. Native Tagalog speakers are one of the country's largest linguistic and cultural groups, numbering an estimated 14 million. The Filipino language, which is the standardised register of Tagalog, is taught in schools nationwide and is an official language of education and business along with English.

Due to the large number of languages of the Philippines, the designation of Tagalog as 'Filipino' and 'national' in character is often disputed, as the Visayan languages (especially Cebuano and Hiligaynon) and Ilocano are among several languages that have comparatively large numbers of speakers, and are themselves used as lingua francas in their respective regions. See also Imperial Manila.

=== Tamil ===
John Guy states that Tamil was the lingua franca for early maritime traders from India and Northern Sri Lanka. The language and its dialects were used widely in the state of Kerala as the major language of administration, literature and common usage until the 12th century AD. Tamil was also used widely in inscriptions found in southern Andhra Pradesh districts of Chittoor and Nellore until the 12th century AD. Tamil was used for inscriptions from the 10th through 14th centuries in southern Karnataka districts such as Kolar, Mysore, Mandya and Bangalore.

=== Thai ===
Many people in Thailand do not speak Central Thai (often referred to as just "Thai") as their native language and instead speak another Thai language, such as Isan, Northern Thai, or Southern Thai etc.; nevertheless, Central Thai is considered the standard and is taught in the education system. As a result, most citizens are able to use Central Thai to communicate.

== Europe ==
=== Greek and Latin ===
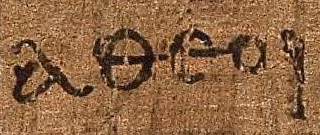
Koine Greek

During the time of the Hellenistic civilization and Roman Empire, the lingua francas were Koine Greek and Latin. During the Middle Ages, the lingua franca was Greek in the parts of Europe, the Middle East and Northern Africa where the Byzantine Empire held hegemony, and Latin was primarily used in the rest of Europe. Latin, for a significant portion of the expansion of the Roman Catholic Church, was the universal language of prayer and worship. After the Second Vatican Council, Catholic liturgy changed to local languages, although Latin remains the official language of the Vatican. Latin was used as the language of scholars in Europe until the early 19th century in most subjects. For instance, Christopher Simpson's "Chelys or The Division viol" on how to improvise on the viol (viola da gamba) was published in 1665 in a multilingual edition in Latin and English, to make the material accessible for the wider European music community. Another example is the Danish-Norwegian writer Ludvig Holberg, who published his book "Nicolai Klimii iter subterraneum" in 1741 about an ideal society "Potu" ("Utop" backwards) with equality between the genders and an egalitarian structure, in Latin in Germany to avoid Danish censorship and to reach a greater audience. Newton's Philosophiæ Naturalis Principia Mathematica was published in Latin in 1687: the first English translation did not appear until 1729. In subjects like medicine and theology, Latin has been a subject of study until the present day in most European universities, despite declining use in recent years. An example of the continuing influence of Latin would be the phrase "lingua franca" itself, being a Latinate one.

=== Old Church Slavonic ===
Countries with widespread use of the Cyrillic script: Sole official script Co-official with another script (either because the official language is biscriptal, or the state is bilingual) Being replaced with Latin, but is still in official use Legacy script for the official language, or large minority use Cyrillic is not widely used

Between the 9th and 11th centuries, Old Church Slavonic was the lingua franca of a great part of the predominantly Slavic states and populations in Southeast and Eastern Europe, in liturgy and church organization, culture, literature, education and diplomacy, as Official language, and National language in the case of Bulgaria. It was the first national and also international Slavic literary language (autonym словѣ́ньскъ ѩꙁꙑ́къ, slověnĭskŭ językŭ).

Old Church Slavonic spread from Bulgaria to other South-Eastern, Central, and Eastern European Slavic territories, most notably Croatia, Serbia, Bohemia, Lesser Poland, and principalities of the Kievan Rus' while retaining characteristically South Slavic linguistic features. It spread also to not completely Slavic territories, like those between the Carpathian Mountains, the Danube and the Black sea.

Later texts written in each of those territories then began to take on characteristics of the local Slavic vernaculars and, by the mid-11th century, Old Church Slavonic had diversified into a number of regional varieties (known as recensions). The Church Slavonic language is the later form which continued to be used as a written lingua franca for religious matters in large areas of the Balkans and Eastern Europe, known as Orthodox Slavdom. From the 16th century, the Russian recension of Church Slavonic became the widely used standard due to the Ottoman conquest of the Balkans, and later became referred to as Synodal Church Slavonic (after the Holy Synod of the Russian Orthodox Church).

Nowadays, the Cyrillic script writing system is used for various languages across Eurasia and is used as the national script in various Slavic, Turkic, Mongolic, Uralic, Caucasian and Iranic-speaking countries in Southeastern Europe, Eastern Europe, the Caucasus, Central Asia, North Asia, and East Asia.

=== English ===
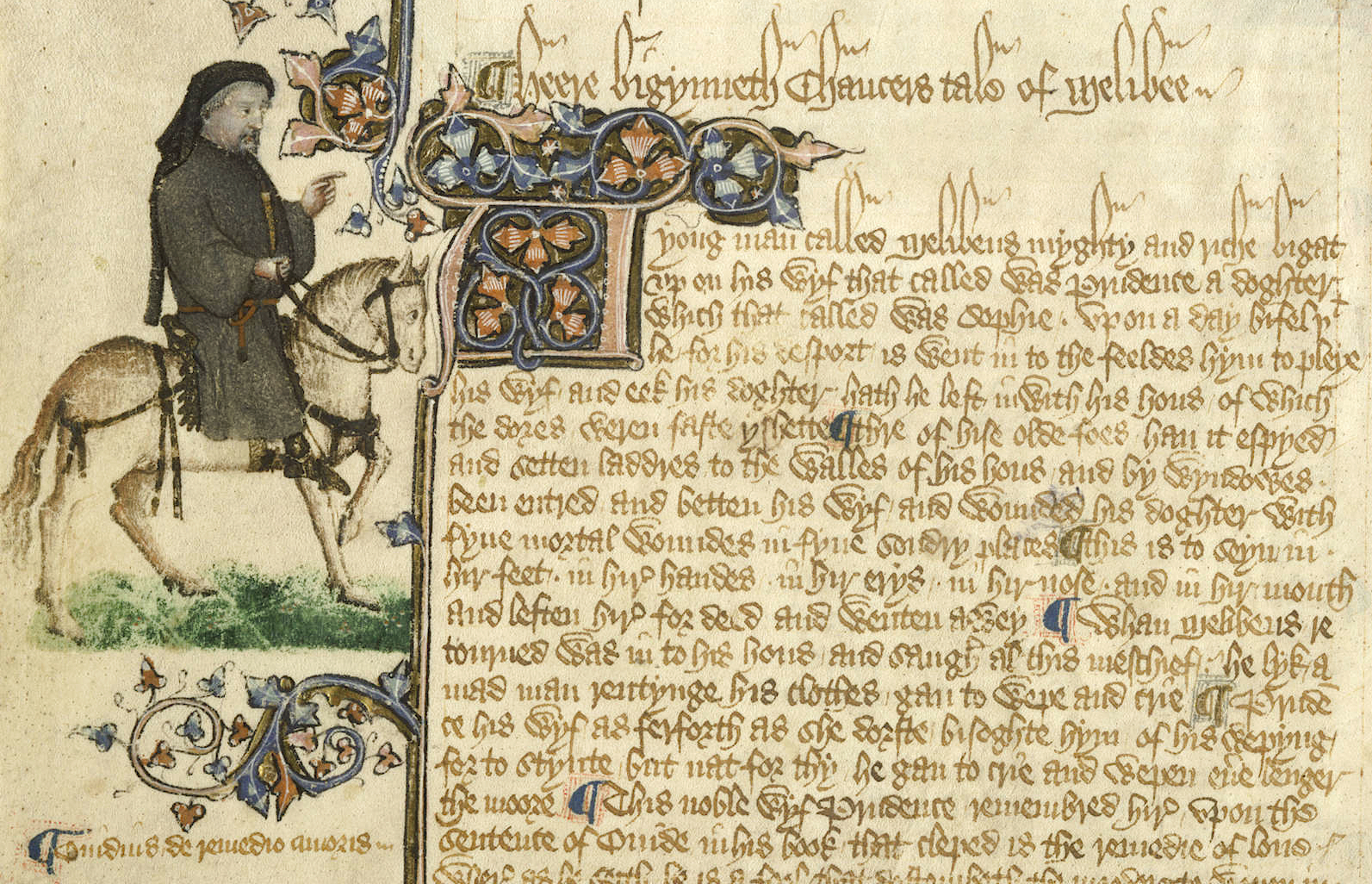
English language

English is the current lingua franca of international business, education, science, technology, diplomacy, entertainment, radio, seafaring, and aviation. Since the end of World War I, it has gradually replaced French as the lingua franca of international diplomacy. The rise of English in diplomacy began in 1919, when the Treaty of Versailles was written in English as well as in French, the dominant language used in diplomacy until that time. The widespread use of English was further advanced by the prominent international role played by English-speaking nations (the United States and the Commonwealth of Nations) in the aftermath of World War II, particularly in the establishment and organization of the United Nations. English is one of the six official languages of the United Nations (the other five being French, Arabic, Chinese, Russian and Spanish). The seating and roll-call order in sessions of the United Nations and its subsidiary and affiliated organizations are determined by alphabetical order of the English names of the countries.

When the United Kingdom became a colonial power, English served as the lingua franca of the colonies of the British Empire. In the post-colonial period, some of the newly created nations which had multiple indigenous languages opted to continue using English as an official language to avoid the political difficulties inherent in promoting any one indigenous language above the others. The British Empire established the use of English in regions around the world such as North America, India, Africa, Australia and New Zealand, so that by the late 19th century its reach was truly global, and in the latter half of the 20th century, widespread international use of English was much reinforced by the global economic, financial, scientific, military, and cultural pre-eminence of the English-speaking countries, especially the United States. Today, more than half of all scientific journals are published in English; even in France almost one-third of all natural science research appears in English, so that English can be seen as the lingua franca of science and technology. English is also the lingua franca of international air traffic control and seafaring communications.

=== French ===
French was the language of diplomacy from the 17th century until the mid-20th century, and is still a working language of some international institutions. In the international sporting world, French is still the lingua franca of the International Olympic Committee, FIFA, and the FIA. French is still seen on documents ranging from passports to airmail letters.

French is spoken by educated people in cosmopolitan cities of the Middle East and North Africa and remains so in the former French colonies of the Maghreb, where French is particularly important in economic capitals such as Algiers, Casablanca and Tunis. Until the outbreak of the civil war in Lebanon, French was spoken by the upper-class Christian population. French is still a lingua franca in most Western and Central African countries and an official language of many, a remnant of French and Belgian colonialism. These African countries and others are members of the Francophonie. French is the official language of the Universal Postal Union, with English added as a working language in 1994.

=== German ===
German served as a lingua franca in portions of Europe for centuries, mainly the Holy Roman Empire outside of the sphere of influence of the Hanseatic League, which used Low German, and to a lesser extent in Eastern Europe where the Polish Empire and the Russian Empire dominated, and South-Eastern Europe where the Ottoman Empire was the dominant cultural influence over the centuries. In fact, the Romantic movement with Goethe and Schiller at its top, at the end of the 18th century, served as a rediscovery of the German language for the German people that used, at this point, largely French as a lingua franca like almost all European regions, but German can be indeed still considered as a lingua franca though with far less importance than French until the 20th century or English today.

German remained an important second language in much of Central and Eastern Europe after the dissolution of the Austro-Hungarian Empire in 1918 for a few years. Today, although to a much diminished degree after World War II, it is still a common second language in a few countries which were formerly part of the empire, such as Slovenia (50% of the population, next to English with 57%), Croatia (34%), the Czech Republic (28%) and Slovakia (28%). In others, it survived so far as a minor language (in Poland by 18%, in Hungary by 16%), usually after English and Russian, in this order, without being considered a lingua franca anymore.

World War II and the expulsion of Germans from many European countries between 1945 and 1950 had a disastrous effect on the use of the German language in Central and Eastern Europe, where it was often suppressed and eventually dropped as a lingua franca by the mid-to-late 20th century, being replaced by Russian during the Cold War and nowadays by English.

=== Italian ===
The Mediterranean Lingua Franca was largely based on Italian, Catalan and Provençal. This language was spoken from the 11th to 19th centuries around the Mediterranean basin, particularly in the European commercial empires of Italian cities (Genoa, Venice, Florence, Milan, Pisa, Siena) and in trading ports located throughout the eastern Mediterranean rim.

During the Renaissance, standard Italian was spoken as a language of culture in the main royal courts of Europe, and among intellectuals. This lasted from the 14th century to the end of the 16th, when French replaced Italian as the usual lingua franca in northern Europe. On the other hand, Italian musical terms, in particular dynamic and tempo notations, have continued in use to the present day, especially for classical music, in music revues and program notes as well as in printed scores. Italian is considered the language of Opera.

In the Catholic ecclesiastic hierarchy, Italian is known by a large part of members and is used in substitution of Latin in most official documents as well. The presence of Italian as the official language in Vatican City indicates its use not only in the seat in Rome, but also anywhere in the world where an episcopal seat is present.

Italian served as the official lingua franca in Italian North Africa (present-day Libya, consisting of the colonies of Cyrenaica, Tripolitania and Fazzan) and in Italian East Africa (consisting of the present-day countries of the Horn of Africa: Eritrea, Ethiopia and Somalia).

=== Low German ===
From about 1200 to 1600, Middle Low German was the language of the Hanseatic League which was present in most Northern European seaports, even London. It resulted in numerous Low German words being borrowed into Danish, Norwegian and Swedish. After the Middle Ages, modern High German and Dutch began to displace Low German, and it has now been reduced to many regional dialects, although they are still largely mutually intelligible. In recent years, the language has seen a resurgence in public interest, and it is increasingly being used as a mode of communication between speakers of (northern) German and (eastern) Dutch nationality.

=== Polish ===
Polish was a lingua franca in areas of Central and Eastern Europe, especially regions that belonged to the Polish–Lithuanian Commonwealth. Polish was for several centuries the main language spoken by the ruling classes in Lithuania and Ukraine, and the modern state of Belarus. After the Partitions of Poland and the incorporation of most of the Polish areas into the Russian Empire as Congress Poland, the Russian language almost completely supplanted Polish.

=== Portuguese ===
Portuguese served as the lingua franca in the Portuguese Empire, Africa, South America and Asia in the 15th and 16th centuries. When the Portuguese started exploring the seas of Africa, America, Asia and Oceania, they tried to communicate with the natives by mixing a Portuguese-influenced version of the lingua franca with the local languages. When Dutch, English or French ships came to compete with the Portuguese, the crews tried to learn this "broken Portuguese". Through a process of change, the lingua franca and Portuguese lexicon were replaced with the languages of the people in contact.

Portuguese remains an important lingua franca in the Portuguese-speaking African countries, East Timor, and to a certain extent, in Macau where it is recognized as an official language alongside Chinese, though in practice not commonly and widely spoken.

=== Russian ===
Russian is in use and widely understood in Central Asia, the Caucasus and the Baltics, areas formerly part of the Soviet Union or bloc, and in much of Central, Southeast and Eastern Europe, formerly part of the Warsaw Pact. It remains the official language of the Commonwealth of Independent States. Russian is also one of the six official languages of the United Nations.

=== Serbo-Croatian ===
Serbo-Croatian is a lingua franca in several of the territories of the former Yugoslavia, Bosnia, Croatia, Montenegro and Serbia. In those four countries, it is the main native language and is also spoken by ethnic minorities. For example, a Hungarian from Vojvodina and an Italian from Istria might use it as a shared second language. Most people in Slovenia and North Macedonia can understand or speak Serbo-Croatian as well. It is a pluricentric language and is commonly referred to as Bosnian, Croatian, Serbian, or Montenegrin depending on the background of the speaker.

=== Spanish ===
With the growth of the Spanish Empire, Spanish became established in the Americas, as well as in parts of Africa, Asia and Oceania. It became the language of global trade until Napoleonic Wars and the breakup of the Spanish Empire at the beginning of the 19th century. Spanish was used as a lingua franca throughout the former Spanish Empire, including territory in present-day U.S., but particularly in present-day Mexico, Spanish Caribbean, Central, South America and the Philippines, and still remains the lingua franca within Hispanic America. It is also widely understood, and spoken to different degrees, by many people in Brazil, especially in the South and Southeast.

At present, it is the second most used language in international trade, and the third most used in politics, diplomacy and culture after English and French.

=== Yiddish ===
Yiddish originated in the Ashkenazi culture that developed from about the 10th century in the Rhineland and then spread to central and eastern Europe and eventually to other continents. For a significant portion of its history, Yiddish was the primary spoken language of the Ashkenazi Jews. Eastern Yiddish, three dialects of which are still spoken today, includes a significant but varying percentage of words from Slavic, Romanian and other local languages.

On the eve of World War II, there were 11 to 13 million Yiddish speakers, for many of whom Yiddish was not the primary language. The Holocaust, however, led to a dramatic, sudden decline in the use of Yiddish, as the extensive Jewish communities, both secular and religious, that used Yiddish in their day-to-day life were largely destroyed. Although millions of Yiddish speakers survived the war, further assimilation in countries such as the United States and the Soviet Union, along with the strictly Hebrew monolingual stance of the Zionist movement, led to a decline in the use of Yiddish. However, the number of speakers within the widely dispersed Orthodox (mainly Hasidic) communities is now increasing. It is a home language in most Hasidic communities, where it is the first language learned in childhood, used in schools, and in many social settings.

In the United States, as well as South America, the Yiddish language bonded Jews from many countries. Most of the Jewish immigrants to the New York metropolitan area during the years of Ellis Island considered Yiddish their native language. Later, Yiddish was no longer the primary language for the majority of the remaining speakers and often served as a lingua franca for the Jewish immigrants who did not know each other's primary language, particularly following the collapse of the Soviet Union. Yiddish was also the language in which second-generation immigrants often continued to communicate with their relatives who remained in Europe or moved to Israel, with English, Spanish or Portuguese being the primary language of the first and Russian, Romanian, or Hebrew that of the second.

== Pre-Columbian North America ==
=== Classic Maya ===
Classic Maya was commonly used as a written language in the Maya civilization, and may have also been a spoken lingua franca among Maya elites.

=== Chinook Jargon ===
Chinook Jargon was originally constructed from a great variety of Amerind words of the Pacific Northwest, arising as an intra-indigenous contact language in a region marked by divisive geography and intense linguistic diversity. The participating peoples came from a number of very distinct language families, speaking dozens of individual languages.

After European contact, the Jargon also acquired English and French loans, as well as words brought by other European, Asian, and Polynesian groups. Some individuals from all these groups soon adopted the Jargon as a highly efficient and accessible form of communication. This use continued in some business sectors well into the 20th century and some of its words continue to feature in company and organization names as well as in the regional toponymy.

In the Diocese of Kamloops, British Columbia, hundreds of speakers also learned to read and write the Jargon using the Duployan shorthand via the publication Kamloops Wawa. As a result, the Jargon also had the beginnings of its own literature, mostly translated scripture and classical works, and some local and episcopal news, community gossip and events, and diaries. Novelist and early Native American activist, Marah Ellis Ryan (1860?–1934) used Chinook words and phrases in her writing.

According to Nard Jones, Chinook Jargon was still in use in Seattle until roughly the eve of World War II, especially among the members of the Arctic Club, making Seattle the last city where the language was widely used. Writing in 1972, he remarked that at that later date "Only a few can speak it fully, men of ninety or a hundred years old, like Henry Broderick, the realtor, and Joshua Green, the banker."

Jones estimates that in pioneer times there were about 100,000 speakers of Chinook Jargon.

=== Hand Talk ===
Plains Sign Language, more directly translated as Hand Talk, but also as Prairie Sign Language, Plains Indian Sign Language, and First Nations Sign Language, was the primary lingua franca of the North American continent from the Sierra Nevadas to Denendeh, well past the Mississippi, and down across the northern states of Mexico. In the West, Hand Talk would give way to Chinook Jargon and perhaps formerly Plateau Sign Language. There remains very little documentation or research on this language and its many dialects. However, it is still spoken significantly across Indian Country, especially by the Cree, Navajo, Anishinaabeg, Shoshone, Blackfeet, and plenty of others.

=== Nahuatl ===
Classical Nahuatl was the lingua franca of the Aztec Empire in Mesoamerica prior to the Spanish invasion in the 16th century. An extensive corpus of the language as spoken exists. Like Latin and Hebrew (prior to the founding of modern Israel), Classical Nahuatl was more of a sociolect spoken among the elites (poets, priests, traders, teachers, bureaucrats) than a language spoken in any common family household.

After the Spanish conquest, Nahuatl remained the lingua franca of New Spain. Spanish friars matched the language to a Latin alphabet, and schools were established to teach Nahuatl to Spanish priests, diplomats, judges, and political leaders. In 1570, Nahuatl was made the official language of New Spain, and it became the lingua franca throughout Spanish North America, used in trade and the courts. During the prolonged Spanish conquest of Guatemala Spain's native allies, mostly from Tlaxcala and Cholula, spread Nahuatl to Maya areas where it was not spoken prior to the arrival of the Spanish, resulting in Nahuatl placenames across Guatemala which persist up to the present. In 1696, the official use of any language other than Spanish was banned throughout the empire. Especially since Mexican independence, the use of Nahuatl has dwindled.

=== Occaneechi ===
Prior to European colonization, the Occaneechi language was said to have served as a lingua franca in the land that would become the state of Virginia. But Robert Beverley Jr., in the 18th century, observed that the Tuscarora, who spoke an Iroquoian language, and the Powhatan, who spoke an Algonquian language, both used Occaneechi in religious ceremonies, like modern Christian communities use Latin. Beverley also noted that the Occaneechi language was used by all native nations of Virginia as a trade language.

After European colonists introduced devastating infectious diseases, all native languages of Virginia began to decline. John Lederer claimed that the Occaneechi spoke a closely related language to the now extinct Tutelo language. There is considerable documentation of the Tutelo language by numerous linguists and interest in the Monacan Indian Nation in reviving the language.

== Pre-Columbian South America ==
Portuguese and Spanish started to grow as lingua francas in the region since the conquests of the 16th century. In the case of Spanish, this process was not even and as the Spanish used the structure of the Inca Empire to consolidate their rule Quechua remained the lingua franca of large parts of what is now Ecuador, Peru and Bolivia. Quechua's importance as a language for trade and dealing with Spanish-approved indigenous authorities (curaca) made the language expand even after the Spanish conquest. It was not until the rebellion of Túpac Amaru II that the Spanish authorities changed to a policy of Hispanization that was continued by the republican states of Peru, Ecuador and Bolivia. Quechua also lost influence to Spanish as the commerce circuits grew to integrate other parts of the Spanish Empire where Quechua was unknown, for example in the Rio de la Plata.

=== Quechua ===
Also known as Runa Simi, as the Inca empire rose to prominence in South America, this imperial language became the most widely spoken language in the western regions of the continent. Even among tribes that were not absorbed by the empire, Quechua still became an important language for trade because of the empire's influence. Even after the Spanish conquest of the Andes, Quechua for a long time was the most common language, and was promoted by the Spanish colonial authorities in the first centuries of colonization. Today it is still widely spoken although it has given way to Spanish as the more common lingua franca. It is spoken by some 10 million people throughout much of South America (mostly in Peru, southwestern and central Bolivia, southern Colombia and Ecuador, northwestern Argentina and northern Chile).

=== Mapudungun ===
Mapudungun was for a long time used as a lingua franca in large portions of Chile and Argentine Patagonia. Adoption of Spanish was in Chile a slow process, and by the 19th century, the unconquered Indians of Araucanía had spread their language across the Andes during a process called Araucanization. Pehuenches were among the first non-Mapuche tribes to adopt the language. The increasing commerce over the Andes and the migration of Mapuches into the Patagonian plains contributed to the adoption of Mapudungun by other tribes of a more simple material culture. Even in Chiloé Archipelago, Spaniards and Mestizos adopted a dialect of Mapudungun as their main language.

=== Tupi ===
The Old Tupi language served as the lingua franca of Brazil among speakers of the various indigenous languages, mainly in the coastal regions. Tupi as a lingua franca, and as recorded in colonial books, was in fact a creation of the Portuguese, who assembled it from the similarities between the coastal indigenous Tupi–Guarani languages. The language served the Jesuit priests as a way to teach natives, and it was widely spoken by Europeans. It was the predominant language spoken in Brazil until 1758, when the Jesuits were expelled from Brazil by the Portuguese government and the use and teaching of Tupi were banned. Since then, Tupi as lingua franca was quickly replaced by Portuguese, although various Tupi–Guarani languages are still spoken by small native groups in Brazil.

== Pidgins and creoles ==
Various pidgin languages have been used in many locations and times as a common trade speech. They can be based on English, French, Chinese, or indeed any other language. A pidgin is defined by its use as a lingua franca, between populations speaking other mother tongues. When a pidgin becomes a population's first language, then it is called a creole language.

=== Guinea-Bissau Creole ===
Guinea-Bissau Creole is a Portuguese creole used as a lingua franca of Guinea-Bissau and Casamance, Senegal, among people of different ethnic groups. It is also the mother tongue of many people in Guinea-Bissau.

=== Tok Pisin ===
Tok Pisin is widely spoken in Papua New Guinea as a lingua franca. It developed as an Australian English-based creole with influences from local languages and to a smaller extent German or Unserdeutsch and Portuguese.

=== Jamaican Patois ===
Jamaican Patois, used as the lingua franca in Jamaica, is an English-based creole language mixed heavily with West African languages, Arawak, Spanish, French and other languages, spoken primarily in Jamaica and among the Jamaican diaspora.

== See also ==
- Interlinguistics
- International auxiliary language
- International English
- Classical language

== Sources ==
- Matthee, Rudi (2009). "Was Safavid Iran an Empire?". Journal of the Economic and Social History of the Orient. 53 (1–2). Brill: 233–265. doi:10.1163/002249910X12573963244449.
