= Dehan dialect =

Dialect of Assamese

Dehan
- Dewan, Dheyan, Dhiyan, Cachari dialect
- দেহান
- Pronunciation: /dehan/
- Native to: Assam, India
- Region: Barak Valley
- Ethnicity: Dehan people (Koch-Rajbongshis of Cachar)
- Native speakers: 5000-8000+
- Language family: Indo-European: Indo-Iranian; Indo-Aryan; Eastern; Bengali-Assamese; Assamese; Dehan
- Writing system: Assamese alphabet

Language codes
- ISO 639-3: –
- Glottolog: None
- Distribution of Dehan dialect in gold.

Dehan, Dewan, Dheyan, Dhiyan or Cachari dialect is a regional variety of Assamese, spoken mainly in the Cachar district of Barak Valley. More specifically, Dehan speakers are mainly found in ten villages in the eastern part of Barak River namely Horinagar, Japirbon, Leburbon, Gororbon, Dewan (Labok) or Dewan Bosti, Narayanpur, Larchingpar, Thaligram, Lakkhichora, and Digli. Though Dehan speakers are located in the same district, however, they are scattered in different places. Out of ten villages, Japirbon is the biggest and the populous one.

Other than Assamese, Dehan shares its lexical items and linguistic features with Sylheti and Bishnupriya Manipuri as well, which is due to long language contact apart from being closely related. Dehan is closely related to the Kamrupi and Standard dialects of Assamese.

== History ==
Among the communities of Barak Valley, the Dehans are one of the early settlers as their settlement dates back to 16th century. They entered Cachar during Chilarai’s conquest of Cachar plains, but some of them didn't return to Brahmaputra Valley and made Cachar their permanent home. Chilarai campaigned through Maibong, Manipur, Jaintia, Srihatta and Tripura and finally the plains of Cachar were annexed to the Koch kingdom as Khaspur kingdom in 1562. Later the Koch principality in Cachar was reduced to a small zamindari in and around Khaspur.

The Koch-Rajbongshis of Barak Valley are better known as Dehans. They initially had their settlements around Khaspur but later, owing to different socio-political compulsions, they had to branch off to different villages.

== Morphology ==
=== Pronouns ===
Personal pronouns
				nominative	accusative	genitive
1st person	singular			moi	mök	mör
1st person	plural			ami	amak	amar
2nd person	singular			toi	tök	tör
2nd person	plural			tumi	tumak	tumar
3rd person	sg	prox	m	i	iak	iar
3rd person	sg	prox	f			
3rd person	sg	dist	m	xi	xiak	xiar
3rd person	sg	dist	f	tai	taik	tair
3rd person	pl		prox			
3rd person	pl		dist	xelök, xilök	xelökok, xilökok	xelökor, xilök

=== Grammatical cases ===
Cases	Suffix	Example
Nominative	none	গছৰ পেনা পাতখিনি সৰছেই। gosor pena patkhini-Ø xorsei. plant-GEN from leaves-ABS fell-IMPERF.3; The leaves fell from the tree.
Ergative	-এ -e	নানায়ে মোক চাই। nana-e mök sa-i. child-ERG I-ACC see-3.HAB.PRES; The child looks at me. Note: The personal pronouns without a plural or other suffix are not marked.
Accusative	-অক, -ক¹, none -ok, -k¹, none	গোপীয়ে চৰইগোটক চাই আছেই। göpie soroigötok sai asei. Gopi-ERG bird-DEF-ACC looking exist-3.PRES.CONT; Gopi is looking at the bird. সি পথাৰ দেখ্ছ্লেই। xi pothar-Ø dekhslei. he field-ACC see-PAST-3; He saw a field.
Genitive	-অৰ, -ৰ¹ -or, -r¹	তাই পাহাৰৰ উপৰত গ’ছেগেই। tai pahar-or uporot gösegei. She hill-GEN above-LOC/DAT went-3.IMPERF.PERF; She went up the hill.
Dative	-অক, -ক¹ -ok, k¹	সি মোক পুথিখন দিছ্লেই। xi mö-k puthikhon dislei. he I-DAT book-ACC give-3.PAST; He gave me the book.
Instrumental	-দি -di	নাওখনগো জুৰিদিনে বান্ধা আছেই। naökhongö zuri-dine bandha asei. boat-CL-DEF rope-INS-FOC tied exist-3.PRES.HAB; The boat has been tied with the rope.
Locative	-অত, -ত¹ -ot, -t¹	সিলোক চোতালত উমুলবালাই লাগছেই। xilök sötal-ot umulbalai laksei. they yard-LOC play-INF.DAT start-IMPERF.3; They are playing in the yard.

1 = Used after vowel-ending words.

== Sample text ==
Dehan	Standard Assamese	Translation
"Ek buri ar ek xialor kotha"	"Burhi ezoni aru xial etar kotha"	"The story of an old woman and a jackal"
Kunö ek somoyot ekhon gaõt ek buri asile. Buri khub suza sorol doyalu asile. Burir khet-bati asile.	Künü ek xomoyot ekhon gaõt ezoni burhi asile. Burhi khub xuza xorol doyalu asile. Burhir kheti-bati asile	Once upon a time there was an old woman in a village. The old woman was very straight simple and kind hearted. The old woman had some assets in the land form of land.
Buri ek din kosu ruar karone godhlabela tukrit kosu loi-ne döŋor pharot göl. Kosubarit tair kosu rui thakö̃te-thakö̃te sonda höl.	Burhi edin kosu rüar karone godhulibela pasit kosu loi(-kine) noir parot göl. Kosubarit tair kosu rui thakü̃te thakü̃te xondhia höl.	One evening the old woman took arum in a basket and went to sow the arum in the bank of the river. While sowing the arum it got dark.
Emon somoyot ota xial ahi hene burik xudile, “Ö buri! Ö buri! , ki ruo?”	Iman xomoyot eta xial ahi (kine) burhik xudhile, “Ö burhi! Ö burhi!, ki rüo?“	At that time a jackal came and asked the oldwoman, “old woman! Old woman what do you sow?”
Burie bulle, “ar ki ruim, hei de kosu ruoŋ ar ki ?”	Burhie bulile, “aru ki rum, hei de kosu rüü̃ aru ki ?”	The oldwoman replied’ “what more I will sow, the same arum.”
Xiale bulle, “o accha toi ze kosu ruo, kosuguti uhuaso ki na?	Xiale köle, “o baru toi ze kosu rüo, kosukeita uhuaiso ne nai?	Jackal said, “oh, tell, you have boiled the yam or not?”
Burie bulle, “nai babai uhua nai, kõsai ruoŋ.”	Burhie köle, “nai büpai, uhua nai, kẽsai rüü̃.“	Oldwoman replied, “No, baba, I haven’t boiled it, I will saw it raw.”
Xiale bulle, “tede bohut din lagbe, buri ek kam kor, kosuguti kali uhaine rubi, sabi eke ratie tör kosu borbor hobe.”	Xiale köle, “tesün bohut din lagibo, burhi ek kam kor, kosukeita kaliloi uhai(-kine) rubi, sabi eke ratie tür kosu daṅor daṅor höbo.”	Jackal said, “then it will take many days to grow, do one thing, sow the arum after boiling, you will see that it will grow up over a night’
Burie bulle, “hoi niki?”	Burhie köle, ”hoy neki?”	Oldwoman said, “Does it happen?”
Xiale bulle,“o hoye de, sabitö rui sa, kali tör kosu khanbi.”	Xiale köle, “o hoye de, sabisün rui sa, kaliloi tür kosu khandibi.”	The jackal said, “Yes, that's true. Dig your arums tomorrow and see.”
Burie bhabile, “Zodi uhaine kosu rua zai ar ekë ratie kosu bor-bor hoi te ar porisom kori labh ki?”	Burhie bhabile, “Zodi uhai(-kine) kosu rüa zay aru ekei ratie kosu bor-bor hoy, te aru porisrom kori labh ki?”	The oldwoman thought, “ If arum grows more over a night time by sowing this way then what’s the use of working so hard?”
Pisot burie bulle, “thik ase moi kali uhainei ruim.”	Pisot burhie köle, “thik ase moi kaliloi uhaikinei rum.”	After that oldwoman said, “ok, I will boil and sow it tomorrow.”
