= Saptakanda Ramayana =

14th-century Assamese poem

Information
- Religion: Hinduism
- Author: Madhava Kandali
- Language: Assamese language
- Period: 14th century
- Chapters: 7

Saptakanda Ramayana is the 14th century Assamese version of the Ramayana attributed to the famous Assamese poet Madhava Kandali. It is considered to be one of the earliest translations from the Sanskrit into a modern regional language, preceded only by Kambar's translation into Tamil and Ranganatha's translation into Telugu, and the first translation to an Indo-Aryan language. The work is also considered one of the earliest written examples of Assamese.

A particular feature of this work is the non-heroic portrayal of Rama, Sita, and other characters, as explicitly stated by Madhav Kandali himself, which rendered the work unsuitable for religious purposes. This feature disturbed a later poet, Ananta Kandali, who was moved enough to comment on it. The first (Adikanda) and last (Uttarakanda) cantos of Madhava Kandali's work were lost, and were later inserted by Madhavdeva and Sankardeva respectively in the 16th century. The poem has been translated into English.

== The Ramayana ==
The Ramayana was written upon the request of the Kachari Barāha/Varāha king Mahamanikya. At that time, his kingdom centered on central Assam Kandali writes:

kavirāj kandali ye āmākese buliwāyā
kariloho sarvajana bodhe.
ramayana supa yara, shri mahamanike ye,
baraha rajar anurudhe.
sat kanda ramayana padabandhe nibandhilo
lambha parihari sarodhrite.
mahamanikyoro bolo kavyarasa kicho dilon
dugdhak mathilo yena ghrite
pandit lokar yebe asantosa upajaya
hat yore bolon shudha bak
pustak bichari yebe taite katha napawaha
tebe sabe nindiba amak.

The poetic work uses various metres for different moods and situations. Some of the metres used are pada (fourteen syllables, four lines of verses), jhumura (four lines, with eight syllables each), dulari (three charana, first and second has six syllables each and the third has eight syllables), and chhavi (like dulari, but with different syllabilic structure). The pada metre became very popular in later Assamese compositions.

Kandali adapted his work according to the taste of the common folk, in order to make it more popular. He portrays Rama and Sita as human characters, with astonishing qualities but with some human weaknesses in certain situations. The original work was based on a vision that the Boraha king was reported to have experienced, of a naked man riding an upturned bowl full of milk.

== Later additions and influences ==
The adi kanda (Book 1) and the uttara kanda (Book 7) were lost by the 15th century, so they were later added by Madhavdev and Srimanta Sankardeva respectively. Sankardeva writes of Kandali:

purvakavi apramadi madhav kandali adi
pade virachila rama katha
hastira dekhiya lada sasa yena phure marga
mora bhaila tenhaya avastha.

Some other additions were made by Ananta Kandali (16th century) and others.

This work has cast a strong influence on Sankardeva, and also later Assamese works. A later Karbi Ramayana was also influenced by this work.
