= Mahamanikya =

Ruler of Assam, India

Mahamanikya (also Manikpha) was a king of the Barāha (Varaha/Bhauma) dynasty who ruled parts of Assam in the 14th-15th century. At the time, his kingdom centered on present-day Nagaon, Morigoan and Hojai districts. At his behest and patronage Madhava Kandali translated the Sanskrit epic Ramayana to Assamese verse called Saptakanda Ramayana. Some historians suggest that he was also involved—along with Indranarayana of Kamata kingdom and Baro-Bhuyans—in resisting Sikandar Shah's invasion into the Brahmaputra valley around 1362.

== Notes ==
- Bez, Gitanjali (2012). "Introduction". Grammatical categories in madhav Kandalis Ramayana (PhD). Guwahati University. hdl:10603/116370.
- Neog, Maheshwar (1953), "Assamese Literature Before Sankaradeva", in Kakati, Banikanta (ed.), Aspects of Early Assamese Literature, Gauhati: Gauhati University, pp. 19–64
- Neog, M (1990), "Assamese Literature", in Barpujari, H K (ed.), The Comprehensive History of Assam, vol. III, Guwahati: Publication Board, Assam, pp. 280–291
- Kakati, Banikanta (1953). Aspects of early Assamese literature. Gauhati University.
- Sharma, Chandan Kumar (2006), "Genealogy Contested: Oral Discourse and Bodo Identity Construction", in Muthukumaraswamy, M.D. (ed.), Folklore as discourse, Chennai: National Folklore Support Centre, pp. 73–94
- Sarkar, J. N. (1992), "Chapter II The Turko-Afghan Invasions", in Barpujari, H. K. (ed.), The Comprehensive History of Assam, vol. 2, Guwahati: Assam Publication Board, pp. 35–48
