= Nagamese creole =

Assamese-derived creole language spoken in Nagaland, India

Nagamese
- Naga Pidgin
- Native to: Northeast India
- Ethnicity: Naga people
- Speakers: (L1: 30,000 cited 1989); L2: 380,000 (2011)
- Language family: Assamese-based creole

Language codes
- ISO 639-3: nag
- Glottolog: naga1394

Nagamese ("Naga Creole") is an Assamese-lexified creole language. Depending on location, it has also been described and classified as an "extended pidgin" or "pidgincreole". Spoken natively by an estimated 30,000 people in the Indian northeastern state of Nagaland, it developed primarily as a means of marketplace and trade communication. Despite the official language of the state being English, Nagamese functions as a lingua franca and is spoken by nearly all inhabitants of Nagaland. It is also used in mass media as well as in official state-regulated domains, including news and radio stations, education and political and governmental spheres. Nagamese is classified as a creole as, despite it being spoken as an "extended pidgin" by the majority of speakers across Nagaland, it is also spoken as the native mother tongue of the Dimasa community in Nagaland's largest city, Dimapur.

== Early origins and evolution ==
Although the precise origins of the Naga people is difficult to determine, it is generally believed by historians that the Naga settled over a period of time in waves as various Naga tribes from China and elsewhere entered the uninhabited Naga Hills through Burma. Additionally, as various different Naga communities settled into Nagaland, Nagaland became inhabited by over twenty indigenous Naga groups, as well as several other immigrant groups, all of whom spoke mutually-unintelligible languages. Despite groups generally remaining in isolation from one another, a way for intergroup communication between the Naga Hills tribes as well as the non-Naga Assamese indigenous people, who lived in the plains and included groups such as the Kachan, Assamese, and Manipuri people, was necessary.

Nagamese primarily developed as a lingua franca because of the contact in the barter trade centres in the plains of Assam between members of different Naga linguistic group communicating with Assamese traders and one another. The contact took place on a regular basis and allowed for the development and eventual stabilization of Nagamese.

Additionally, there is evidence of language contact interactions between the indigenous, Ahom rulers and various Naga groups regarding revenue and tax collection, treaty negotiation, administrative purposes and warfare. Ahom rulers would occasionally send expeditions to raid and subjugate the Nagas and to make them pay tribute, which caused tension and hostility to build between the Naga and Assamese at different times.

In 1826, British East India troops occupied the Ahom Kingdom, and Assamese was initially used as the primary language of instruction within schools, with English and Hindi to be introduced as second languages to the pupils. Assamese was thought to have become the lingua franca, but upon contact with the people from the Naga Hills, it was clear that Nagamese, which was viewed as "pidgin Assamese", was the lingua franca of the Naga Hills that was spoken by the majority, if not the entirety, of the population.

The propagation of Nagamese as a lingua franca was furthered after the 1930s. English was selected as the unifying official state language of Nagaland, but less than 5% of the population spoke it with any degree of fluency. Certainly, it was spoken by only a small number of the population, and most teachers often had a poor grasp of it. With the increased interest and emphasis on education, teachers often used Nagamese in classroom teachings, discussions, and proper explanations of the subject matter. As most Naga children either had some familiarity with or were fluent in Nagamese, rather than English, teachers teaching mixed classes often resorted to the use of Nagamese, which further cementing its as a language widely used by the majority of the population.

In the early 1970s, M.V Sreedhar sought to begin standardization processes with the intention of producing Nagamese educational material. He consulted with Naga leaders and relevant authorities regarding whether the Devanagari, Assamese, Roman or Bengali scripts should be made standard. It was agreed upon that the Roman script was to be adopted into Nagamese writing. As the population was predominantly Christianized under the British and was generally familiar with the Roman script by texts that the missionaries had brought, it was considered the most favourable. It was also considered the most neutral option, as it could be used to distance themselves from further association with the Assamese.

Despite the tension and history of ethnic conflict, the requirement of communication between the Naga and non-Naga peoples induced linguistic contact, which was conducive to the growth and use of Nagamese as a method of intergroup communication.

Nagamese gradually became more complex as it spread across the region and into various domains of the state and is now used in almost all domains of daily life. It functions as the language of wider communication, with speakers being able to converse about any topic that they wish to in Nagamese. In addition to being spoken casually between individuals, it is also used within official state-regulated domains such as conducting parliament meetings; at religious gatherings; within the education system; and within the healthcare system between nurse, doctor, and patient communication. Nagamese is also the preferred form of communication for extension works in rural areas and in mixed households.

== Linguistics ==
Nagamese has a large lexicon, with a number of clear grammatical categories and clear inflectional morphology. It is structurally reduced in comparison to Assamese, which is the source of the majority of the lexicon, phonology, and syntax. Nagamese has two cases, two tenses and three aspectual distinctions. There is no gender, but grammatical gender is beginning to appear from Hindi influence and is particularly visible in Hindi words and expressions. There are 26 consonants, and 6 vowels. There are no nasal vowels in Nagamese, and tone is not a defining trait within it.

== Phonology ==
The Nagamese Creole phonemic inventory consists of six vowels, seven diphthongs, and twenty-eight consonants (including two semivowels).

Vowels
	Front	Central	Back
	IPA	IPA	IPA
Close	i		u
Close-mid	e	ə	o
Open		aː	

Diphthongs
	aː	i	o	u
aː		aːi	aːo	aːu
i	iaː			
o		oi		
u	uaː	ui		

=== Consonants ===
		Labial	Dental/ Alveolar	Retroflex	Palatal	Velar	Glottal
Nasal		m	n			ŋ	
Plosive/ Affricate	voiceless	p	t	ʈ	tʃ	k	
Plosive/ Affricate	voiceless aspirated	pʰ	tʰ		tʃʰ	kʰ	
Plosive/ Affricate	voiced	b	d	ɖ	dʒ	ɡ	
Plosive/ Affricate	voiced aspirated	bʱ	dʱ		dʒʱ	ɡʱ	
Fricative			s		ʃ		h
Trill			r				
w	l		j	(w)			

== Literature ==
- Nagaland (1979), by Navamalati Chakraborty, has been described as the first book written in Nagamese. Published by the Asam Sahitya Sabha in Roman script, it comprises 14 chapters covering topics including Nagaland's history, food, customs and folk songs.

== See also ==
- Nefamese
