= Assamese language =

Indo-Aryan language of India

Assamese
- Asamiya; Ôxômiya
- অসমীয়া
- The word "Ôxômiya" in the traditional Assamese (above) and the current Bengali–Assamese (below) scripts.
- Pronunciation: [ɔxɔmija]
- Native to: India
- Region: Northeast India: Assam; Arunachal Pradesh; Meghalaya; Nagaland
- Ethnicity: Assamese
- Speakers: L1: 15 million (2011); L2: 8.3 million (2011); Total: 24 million (2011)
- Language family: Indo-European: Indo-Iranian; Indo-Aryan; Eastern; Bengali–Assamese; Assamese
- Early forms: Magadhi Prakrit: Magadhan Apabhraṃśa; Kamarupi Prakrit; Early Assamese
- Standard forms: Modern Standard Assamese
- Dialects: Eastern; Central; Kamrupi; Goalpariya; Dehan
- Writing system: Bengali–Assamese script (Assamese alphabet; current); Assamese script (also called the Kamarupi script; in decline since the 20th century); Assamese Braille; Latin script (Nagamese and Nefamese)

Official status
- Official language in: India; Assam
- Regulated by: Asam Sahitya Sabha (Literary Society of Assam)

Language codes
- ISO 639-1: as
- ISO 639-2: asm
- ISO 639-3: asm
- Glottolog: assa1263
- Linguasphere: 59-AAF-w
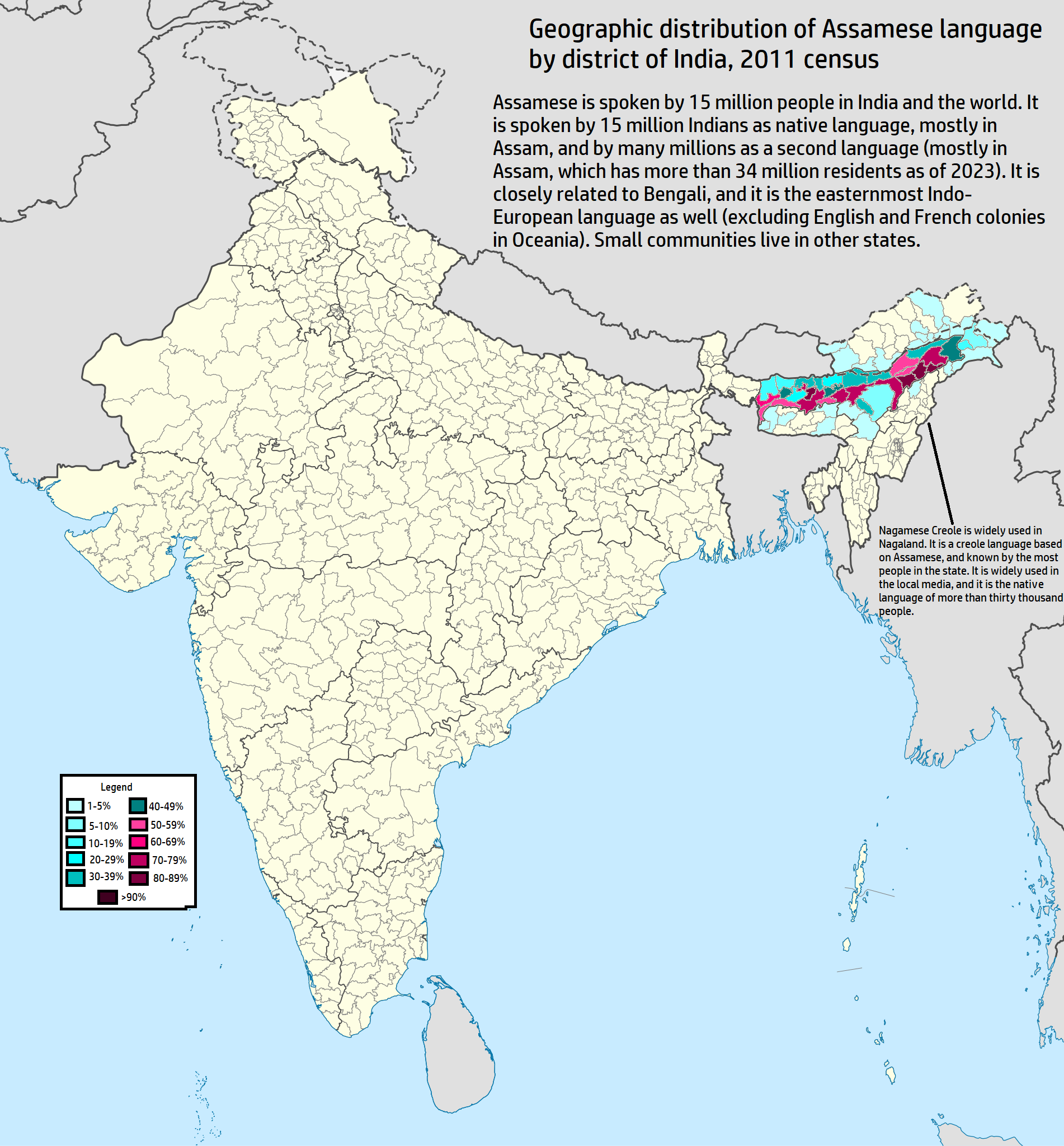
- Geographic distribution of the Assamese language in India

Assamese, (Note: /ˌæsəˈmiːz/ AS-ə-MEEZ) also known by its endonyms Asamiya or Oxomiya (Note: অসমীয়া Ôxômiya [ɔxɔmija].) (অসমীয়া Ôxômiya [ɔxɔmija]), is an Indo-European language of the Indo-Aryan branch spoken mainly in the north-eastern Indian state of Assam, where it is an official language. It has long served as a lingua franca in parts of Northeast India. It has over 15 million native speakers and 8.3 million second language speakers according to Ethnologue, although this claim is widely disputed by academics, based on census figures. Assamese was designated as a classical Indian language by the Government of India on 3 October 2024 on account of its antiquity and literary traditions.

Nefamese, an Assamese-based pidgin in Arunachal Pradesh, was used as a lingua franca before being replaced by Hindi; and Nagamese, an Assamese-based Creole language, continues to be widely used in Nagaland. The Kamtapuri language of Rangpur Division of Bangladesh and the Cooch Behar and Jalpaiguri districts of India is linguistically closest to Assamese and they both are descended from the Kamarupi Prakrit. In the past, it was the court language of the Ahom kingdom from the 17th century.

After the differentiation of Maithili and Odia, Assamese was in its formative stages in the 12th century CE from the middle Indo-Aryan Magadhi Prakrit. Its sister languages include Angika, Bengali, Bishnupriya Manipuri, Chakma, Chittagonian, Hajong, Rajbangsi, Surjapuri, Maithili, Rohingya and Sylheti. It has been written in the Assamese script till the 20th century, and the Bengali-Assamese script from the mid-19th century, which are abugida systems, from left to right, with many typographic ligatures.

== History ==
The proto-languages of the eastern Magadhan languages. Kamarupi Prakrit corresponds to ?proto-Kamarupa here, a hitherto un-reconstructed proto-language. proto-Kamata began to innovate unique features in the period 1250–1550 CE.

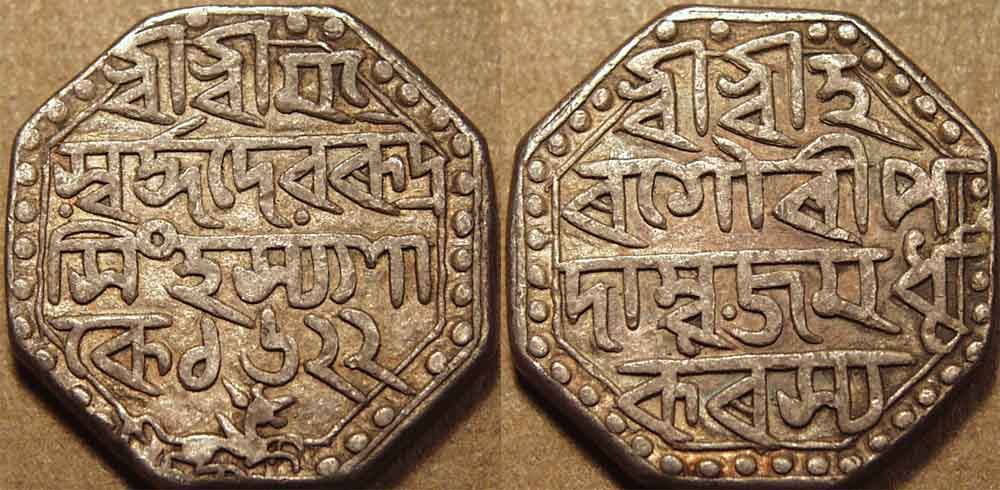
Silver coin issued during the reign of Rudra Singha in Sanskrit with Assamese letters

Assamese originated in Old Indo-Aryan dialects, though the exact nature of its origin and growth is not clear yet. It is generally believed that Assamese and the Kamatapuri lects derive from the Kamarupi Prakrit, an eastern variety of the Magadhi Prakrit, though an admixture with the Sauraseni Prakrit is also hypothesised by one author. The Indo-Aryan, which appeared in the 4th–5th century in Assam, was probably spoken in the new settlements of Kamarupa—in urban centres and along the Brahmaputra River—surrounded by Tibeto-Burman and Austroasiatic communities. Kakati's (1941) assertion that Assamese has an Austroasiatic substrate is generally assumed—which suggests that when the Indo-Aryan centres formed in the 4th–5th centuries CE, there were substantial Austroasiatic speakers that later accepted the Indo-Aryan vernacular. Based on the 7th-century Chinese traveller Xuanzang's observations, Chatterji (1926) suggests that the Indo-Aryan vernacular differentiated itself in Kamarupa before it did in Bengal, and that these differences could be attributed to non-Indo-Aryan speakers adopting the language. The newly differentiated vernacular, from which Assamese eventually emerged, is evident in the Prakritisms present in the Sanskrit of the Kamarupa inscriptions.

=== Magadhan and Gauda-Kamarupa stages ===
The earliest forms of Assamese in literature are found in the 9th-century Buddhist verses called Charyapada the language of which bear some affinities with Assamese (as well as Bengali, Maithili and Odia) and which belongs to a period when the Prakrit was at the cusp of differentiating into regional languages. The spirit and expressiveness of the Charyadas are today found in the folk songs called Deh-Bicarar Git.

In the 12th-14th century Bengal works of Ramai Pandit (Sunya Puran), Chandidas (Krishna Kirtan), Sukur Mamud (Gopichandrar Gan), Durlabha Mallik (Gobindachandrar Git) and Bhavani Das (Mainamatir Gan) Assamese grammatical peculiarities coexist with features from Bengali language. Though the Gauda-Kamarupa stage is generally accepted and partially supported by recent linguistic research, it has not been fully reconstructed.

=== Early Assamese ===
A distinctly Assamese literary form appeared first in the 14th century in the courts of the Kamata kingdom when Hema Sarasvati composed the poem Prahlāda Carita. In the 14th-century, Madhava Kandali translated the Ramayana into Assamese (Saptakanda Ramayana) in the court of Mahamanikya, a Kachari king from central Assam. Though the Assamese idiom in these works is fully individualised, some archaic forms and conjunctive particles too are found. This period corresponds to the common stage of proto-Kamta and early Assamese.

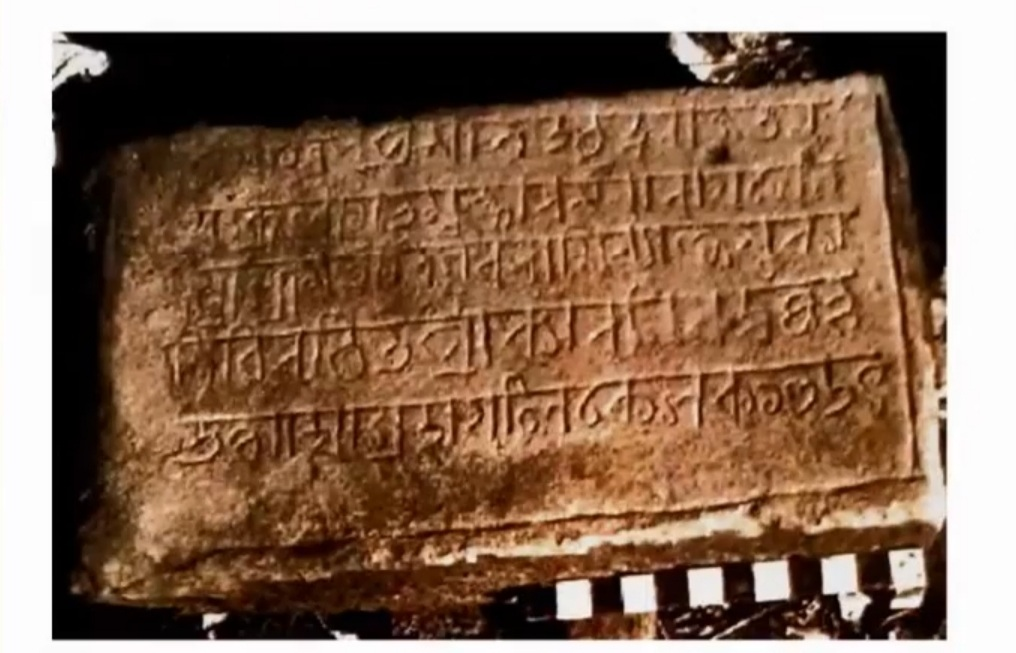
Tamreswari Temple Stone inscription of Chutia king Muktadharmanarayana dated to 1442 AD written in the Assamese script.

The emergence of Sankardev's Ekasarana Dharma in the 15th century triggered a revival in language and literature. Sankardev produced many translated works and created new literary forms—Borgeets (songs), Ankia Naat (one-act plays)—infusing them with Brajavali idioms; and these were sustained by his followers Madhavdev and others in the 15th and subsequent centuries. In these writings the 13th/14th-century archaic forms are no longer found. Sankardev pioneered a prose-style of writing in the Ankia Naat. This was further developed by Bhattadeva who translated the Bhagavata Purana and Bhagavad Gita into Assamese prose. Bhattadev's prose was classical and restrained, with a high usage of Sanskrit forms and expressions in an Assamese syntax; and though subsequent authors tried to follow this style, it soon fell into disuse. In this writing the first person future tense ending -m (korim: "will do"; kham: "will eat") is seen for the first time.

=== Middle Assamese ===
The language moved to the court of the Ahom kingdom in the seventeenth century, where it became the state language. In parallel, the proselytising Ekasarana dharma converted many Bodo-Kachari peoples and there emerged many new Assamese speakers who were speakers of Tibeto-Burman languages. This period saw the emergence of different styles of secular prose in medicine, astrology, arithmetic, dance, music, besides religious biographies and the archaic prose of magical charms.

Most importantly this was also when Assamese developed a standardised prose in the Buranjis—documents related to the Ahom state dealing with diplomatic writings, administrative records and general history. The language of the Buranjis is nearly modern with some minor differences in grammar and with a pre-modern orthography. The Assamese plural suffixes (-bor, -hat) and the conjunctive participles (-gai: dharile-gai; -hi: pale-hi, baril-hi) become well established. The Buranjis, dealing with statecraft, was also the vehicle by which Arabic and Persian elements crept into the language in abundance. Due to the influence of the Ahom state the speech in eastern Assam took a homogeneous and standard form. The general schwa deletion that occurs in the final position of words came into use in this period.

=== Modern Assamese ===
The modern period of Assamese begins with printing—the publication of the Assamese Bible in 1813 from the Serampore Mission Press. But after the British East India Company (EIC) removed the Burmese in 1826 and took complete administrative control of Assam in 1836, it filled administrative positions with people from Bengal, and introduced Bengali language in its offices, schools and courts. The EIC had earlier promoted the development of Bengali to replace Persian, the language of administration in Mughal India, and maintained that Assamese was a dialect of Bengali.

Amidst this loss of status, the American Baptist Mission (ABM) established a press in Sibsagar in 1846 leading to publications of an Assamese periodical (Orunodoi), the first Assamese grammar by Nathan Brown (1846), and the first Assamese-English dictionary by Miles Bronson (1863). The ABM argued strongly with the EIC officials in an intense debate in the 1850s to reinstate Assamese. Among the local personalities, Anandaram Dhekial Phukan drew up an extensive catalogue of medieval Assamese literature (among other works) and pioneered the effort among the natives to reinstate Assamese in Assam. Though this effort was not immediately successful the administration eventually declared Assamese the official vernacular in 1873 on the eve of Assam becoming a Chief Commissioner's Province in 1874.

==== Standardisation ====
In the extant medieval Assamese manuscripts the orthography was not uniform. The ABM had evolved a phonemic orthography based on a contracted set of characters. Working independently Hemchandra Barua provided an etymological orthography and his etymological dictionary, Hemkosh, was published posthumously. He also provided a Sanskritised approach to the language in his Asamiya Bhaxar Byakaran ("Grammar of the Assamese Language") (1859, 1873). Barua's approach was adopted by the Asamiya Bhasa Unnati Sadhini Sabha (1888, "Assamese Language Development Society") that emerged in Kolkata among Assamese students led by Lakshminath Bezbaroa. The Society published a periodical Jonaki and the period of its publication, Jonaki era, saw spirited negotiations on language standardisation. What emerged at the end of those negotiations was a standard close to the language of the Buranjis with the Sanskritised orthography of Hemchandra Barua.

As the political and commercial centre moved to Guwahati in the mid-twentieth century, of which Dispur the capital of Assam is a suburb and which is situated at the border between the western and central dialect speaking regions, standard Assamese used in media and communications today is a neutral blend of the eastern variety without its distinctive features. This core is further embellished with Goalpariya and Kamrupi idioms and forms.

== Geographical distribution ==
Assamese is native to Assam and surrounding regions of Northeast India. It is majorly spoken in the state of Assam. Other major areas where the language is extensively used include Arunachal Pradesh’s Namsai, Lohit and Changlang districts; Meghalaya’s west Garo Hills; Nagaland’s Dimapur, Kohima, Mokokchung, Wokha and Zunheboto; West Bengal’s Jalpaiguri and Cooch Behar districts.

There is a significant Assamese-speaking diaspora worldwide.

=== Official status ===
Assamese is the official language of Assam, and one of the 22 official languages recognised by the Republic of India. The Assam Secretariat functions in Assamese.

== Phonology ==
The Assamese phonemic inventory consists of eight vowels, ten diphthongs, and twenty-three consonants (including two semivowels).

=== Consonants ===
Consonants
		Labial	Alveolar	Dorsal	Glottal
Nasal		m ⟨m, ম⟩	n ⟨n, ন/ণ⟩	ŋ ⟨ng, ঙ/ং⟩	
Plosive	tenuis	p ⟨p, প⟩	t ⟨t, ত/ট⟩	k ⟨k, ক⟩	
Plosive	aspirated	pʰ ⟨ph, ফ⟩	tʰ ⟨th, থ/ঠ⟩	kʰ ⟨kh, খ⟩	
Plosive	voiced	b ⟨b, ব⟩	d ⟨d, দ/ড⟩	ɡ ⟨g, গ⟩	
Plosive	murmured	bʱ ⟨bh, ভ⟩	dʱ ⟨dh, ধ/ঢ⟩	ɡʱ ⟨gh, ঘ⟩	
Fricative	voiceless		s ⟨s, চ/ছ⟩	x ⟨x, শ/ষ/স⟩	h ⟨h, হ⟩
Fricative	voiced		z ⟨z, জ/য⟩		
Approximant	median	w ⟨w, ৱ⟩	ɹ ⟨r, ৰ/ড়⟩	j ⟨y, য়/্য (য)⟩	
Approximant	lateral		l ⟨l, ল⟩		

==== Alveolar stops ====
The Assamese phoneme inventory is unique among Indo-Aryan languages as it lacks both postalveolar affricates and fricatives and also a dental-retroflex distinction among the coronal stops. Historically, the dental and retroflex series merged into alveolar stops. This makes Assamese resemble non-Indic languages of Northeast India (such as Austroasiatic and Sino-Tibetan languages). The only other language to have fronted retroflex stops into alveolars is the closely related group of eastern dialects of Bengali (although a contrast with dental stops remains in those dialects). /r/ is normally realised as [ɹ] or [ɻ].

==== Voiceless velar fricative ====
Assamese is unusual among Eastern Indo-Aryan languages for the presence of /x/ (realised as [x] or [χ], depending on the speaker and speech register), due historically to the lenition of Middle Indo-Aryan sibilants to /x/ (initially) and /h/ (non-initially). The use of the voiceless velar fricative is heavy in the eastern Assamese dialects and decreases progressively to the west from Kamrupi to eastern Goalparia, and disappears completely in western Goalpariya. The change of /s/ to /h/ and then to /x/ has been attributed to Tibeto-Burman influence by Suniti Kumar Chatterjee.

In some cases, /kʰ/ can even merge with /χ/ or /x/ (akhɔr → axɔr "a letter (of an alphabet)").

==== Velar nasal ====
In contrast to other Indo-Aryan languages, Assamese, as well as Odia and Bengali, uses the velar nasal /ŋ/ (the English ng in sing) extensively. While in many languages, the velar nasal is commonly restricted to preceding velar sounds, in Assamese it can occur intervocalically. This is another feature it shares with other languages of Northeast India, though in Assamese the velar nasal never occurs word-initially.

=== Vowels ===
Monophthongs
	Front	Central	Back
Close	i ⟨i, ই/ঈ⟩		u ⟨u, উ/ঊ⟩
Near-close			ʊ ⟨ü, ও⟩
Close-mid	e ⟨é, এʼ⟩		o ⟨ó, অʼ⟩
Open-mid	ɛ ⟨e, এ⟩		ɔ ⟨o, অ⟩
Open		a ⟨a, আ⟩	

Diphthongs
	a	i	u	e	o	ɔ
a			ua			
i	ai		ui	ei	oi	ɔi
u	au	iu		eu	ou	

Eastern Indic languages like Assamese, Bengali, Sylheti, and Odia do not have a vowel length distinction, but have a wide set of back rounded vowels. In the case of Assamese, there are four back rounded vowels that contrast phonemically, as demonstrated by the minimal set: কলা kola [kɔla] ('deaf'), ক'লা kóla [kola] ('black'), কোলা kwla [kʊla] ('lap'), and কুলা kula [kula] ('winnowing fan'). The near-close near-back rounded vowel /ʊ/ is unique in this branch of the language family. However, in lower Assam, ও is pronounced the same as অ' (ó): compare কোলা kwla [kóla] and মোৰ mwr [mór].

According to linguist Shakuntala Mahanta, phonemic nasals vowel /ã/ and /ʊ̃/ are present in Assamese, contrasting with /a/ and /ʊ/. They are the only nasal vowel phonemes in the language.

==== Vowel harmony ====
Assamese has vowel harmony. The vowels [i] and [u] cause the vowels [ɛ], [ɔ] and [ʊ] in a preceding syllable to change to [e], [o] and [u] respectively. Assamese is one of the few languages spoken in India which exhibit systematic vowel harmony.

==== Schwa deletion ====
The inherent vowel in standard Assamese, /ɔ/, undergoes deletion in certain environments; this is known as schwa deletion. (Note: Despite the name, the phenomenon does not refer to the vowel [ə] or other similar vowels like in other Indo-Aryan languages.) This means that, even though the orthography indicates the presence of an [ɔ], the vowel may not be pronounced. In the modern standard, /ɔ/ is generally deleted at the end of a word, except when following /w/ and when following the sequences /ij/ or /uj/. It is retained at the end of honorific words. /ɔ/ is deleted word-internally when it is followed by another vowel and at morphological boundaries. The rule for deleting the final /ɔ/ was not followed in Early Assamese.

== Writing system ==
Rô One of the consonants of the modern Assamese alphabet

The traditional Assamese script

Modern Assamese uses the Assamese alphabet which was based on the Bengali standard introduced by the missionaries. The traditional Assamese script which was used before the 20th century had significant differences from the Bengali script and as a result of the replacement, the traditional Assamese script is largely illegible to the people trained in the current Bengali-based Assamese alphabet. The traditional Assamese script came in three varieties: Bamuniya, Garhgaya, and Kaitheli/Lakhari, which developed from the Kamarupi script. It is closely related to the Mithilakshar script of the Maithili language, as well as the Bengali alphabet. There is a strong literary tradition from early times. Examples can be seen in edicts, land grants and copper plates of medieval kings. Assam had its own manuscript writing system on the bark of the saanchi tree in which religious texts and chronicles were written, as opposed to the pan-Indian system of Palm leaf manuscript writing. The present-day spellings in Assamese are not necessarily phonetic. Hemkosh (হেমকোষ [ɦɛmkʊx]), the second Assamese dictionary, introduced spellings based on Sanskrit, which are now the standard.

Assamese has also historically been written using the Arabic script by Assamese Muslims. One example is Tariqul Haq Fi Bayane Nurul Haq by Zulqad Ali (1796–1891) of Sivasagar, which is one of the oldest works in modern Assamese prose.

In the early 1970s, it was agreed upon that the Roman script was to be the standard writing system for Nagamese Creole. In January 2020, the Assam government announced that Assamese would be a mandatory language for government job eligibility.

=== Sample text ===
The following is a portion from the story Silonir ziekor xadhu (The tale of the kite's daughter), written by Lakshminath Bezbaruah in his book Burhi Aair Xadhu:

চৰুটো নৈত উটি গৈ আছে, এনেতে নৈৰ পাৰত কাপোৰ ধুই থকা ধোবা এটাই চৰুটো দেখি তাত কি আছে চাওঁ বুলি সাঁতুৰি গৈ সাঁফৰটো মেলি দেখিলে, নকৈ হোৱা কেঁচুৱা ছোৱালী এজনী তাতে ভৰাই কোনোবাই উটাই দিছে। ধোবাটোৱে ছোৱালীজনী তুলি ল’বৰ মনেৰে সাঁফৰটো গুচাই চৰুটো ধৰি লাহে লাহে সাঁতুৰি বামৰ ফালে টানি আনোতেই, হঠাৎ এজনী চিলনীয়ে থাপ মাৰি চৰুটোৰ পৰা ছোৱালীজনী লৈ গুচি গ’ল। এজোপা আঁহত গছৰ আগত চিলনীজনীৰ বাহ আছিল। তাই ছোৱালীজনী সেই বাহতে থ’লেগৈ। কণমান ৰূপহ ছোৱালীটি দেখি চিলনীৰ বৰ মৰম লাগিল। সেইদেখি তাই ছোৱালীজনী তুলি-তালি ডাঙৰ-দীঘল কৰিবলৈ মনতে ঠিক কৰিলে।
sörutü nöit uti göi ase, enete nöir parot kapür dhui thoka dhüba etai sörutü dëkhi tat ki ase saü̃ buli xãturi göi xãphortü mëli dëkhile, noköi hüa kẽsua süali ezoni tate bhorai künübai utai dise. dhübatüe süalizoni tuli löbor monere xãphortü gusai sorutü dhori lahe lahe xãturi bamor phale tani anü̃tëi, hothat‌ ezoni silonie thap mari sörutür pora süalizoni löi gusi göl. ezüpa ãhot gosor agot silonizonir bah asil. tai süalizoni xëi bahote thölegöi. konman rupoh süaliti dëkhi silonir bor morom lagil. xëidëkhi tai süalizoni tuli-tali daṅor-dighol köribolöi monote thik körile.
so̞ɹutʊ no̞it uti go̞i asɛ, ɛnɛtɛ no̞iɹ paɹɔ̞t kapʊɹ dʱui thɔ̞ka dʱʊba ɛtai so̞ɹutʊ dekʰi tat ki asɛ saʊ̃ buli x̟ãtuɹi go̞i x̟ãpʰɔ̞ɹtʊ meli dekʰilɛ, nɔ̞ːko̞i hʊa kẽsua sʊali ɛzɔ̞ni tatɛ bhɔ̞ɹai kʊnʊbai utai disɛ. dʱʊbatʊɛ sʊalizɔ̞ni tuli lo̞bɔ̞ɹ mɔ̞nɛɹɛ x̟ãpʰɔ̞ɹtʊ gusai sɔ̞ɹutʊ dʱo̞ɹi lahɛ lahɛ x̟ãtuɹi bamɔ̞ɹ pʰalɛ tani anʊ̃tei, hɔ̞that‌ ɛzɔ̞ni silɔ̞niɛ thap maɹi so̞ɹutʊɹ pɔ̞ɹa sʊalizɔ̞ni lo̞i gusi go̞l. ɛzʊpa ãhɔ̞t gɔ̞sɔ̞ɹ agɔ̞t silɔ̞nizɔ̞niɹ bah asil. tai sʊalizɔ̞ni x̟ei bahɔ̞tɛ tho̞lɛgɔ̞̞i. kɔ̞nman ɹupɔ̞h sʊaliti dekʰi silɔ̞niɹ bɔ̞ɹ mɔ̞ɹɔ̞m lagil. x̟eidekʰi tai sʊalizɔ̞ni tuli-tali daŋɔ̞ɹ-digʱɔ̞l ko̞ɹibɔ̞lo̞i mɔ̞nɔ̞tɛ thik ko̞ɹilɛ.
pot-the river-in floating going being, such-in river's bank-on clothe(s) washing staying washerman one-cʟs-ᴇʀɢ pot-the seeing there-in what exists see-1ᴘ saying/thinking swimming going lid-the opening saw, new-ly being baby girl one-cʟs there-in-ᴇᴍᴘʜ inserting someone-ᴇʀɢ floating gave. Washerman-the girl-cʟs lifting taking-of mind-with lid-the removing pot-the holding slow-with slow-with swimming shallow-of side-in pulling bring-while-ᴇᴍᴘʜ, suddenly one-cʟs kite-ᴇʀɢ snatch doing pot-the-of from girl-cʟs taking removing went. One-cʟs peepul tree's top-in kite-the-of nest existed. She girl-the that nest-in-ᴇᴍᴘʜ put-going. Little beauty girl-the seeing kite's very love attached. That-seeing she girl-the lifting big-long doing-for mind-in-ᴇᴍᴘʜ fix did.
The pot is floating on the river, in such a time a washerman who was washing clothes on the bank of the river saw the pot and wanting to see what's inside, swam towards it, opened the lid and saw that a newly born baby girl was put there and floated by someone. The washerman wanted to adopt the girl, but when he was bringing it towards the shallow water, holding the pot, swimming slowly after having removed the lid, suddenly a kite snatched the girl from the pot and took her away. The kite had her nest on the top of a peepul tree. She put the girl on that nest. Seeing the beautiful little girl, the kite felt affection. Therefore she decided to raise the girl.

== Morphology and grammar ==
The Assamese language has the following characteristic morphological features:

- Gender and number are not grammatically marked.
- There is a lexical distinction of gender in the third person pronoun.
- Transitive verbs are distinguished from intransitive.
- The agentive case is overtly marked as distinct from the accusative.
- Kinship nouns are inflected for personal pronominal possession.
- Adverbs can be derived from the verb roots.
- A passive construction may be employed idiomatically.

=== Classifiers ===
Assamese has a large collection of classifiers, which are used extensively for different kinds of objects, acquired from the Sino-Tibetan languages. A few examples of the most extensive and elaborate use of classifiers are given below:

- "zɔn" is used to signify a person, male with some amount of respect
  - E.g., manuh-zɔn – "the man"
- "zɔni" (female) is used after a noun or pronoun to indicate human beings
  - E.g., manuh-zɔni – "the woman"
- "zɔni" is also used to express the non-human feminine
  - E.g., sɔɹai zɔni – "the bird", pɔɹuwa-zɔni – "the ant"
- "zɔna" and "gɔɹaki" are used to express high respect for both man and woman
  - E.g., kɔbi-zɔna – "the poet", gʊxaɪ-zɔna – "the goddess", rastrapati-gɔɹaki – "the president", tiɹʊta-gɔɹaki – "the woman"
- "tʊ" has three forms: tʊ, ta, ti
  - (a) tʊ: is used to specify something, although the case of someone, e.g., loɹa-tʊ – "the particular boy", is impolite
  - (b) ta: is used only after numerals, e.g., ɛta, duta, tinita – "one, two, three"
  - (c) ti: is the diminutive form, e.g., kesua-ti – "the infant, besides expressing more affection or attachment to
- "kɔsa", "mɔtʰa" and "taɹ" are used for things in bunches
  - E.g., sabi-kɔsa – "the bunch of key", saul-mɔtʰa – "a handful of rice", suli-taɹi or suli kɔsa – "the bunch of hair"
- dal, dali, are used after nouns to indicate something long but round and solid
  - E.g., bãʱ-dal – "the bamboo", katʰ-dal – "the piece of wood", bãʱ-dali – "the piece of bamboo"

Assamese Classifiers
Classifier	Referent	Examples
/zɔn/	males (adult)	manuh-zɔn (the man – honorific)
/zɔni/	females (women as well as animals)	manuh-zɔni (the woman), sɔrai-zɔni (the bird)
/zɔna/	honorific	kobi-zɔna (the poet), gʊxai-zɔna (the god/goddess)
/ɡɔɹaki/	males and females (honorific)	manuh-ɡɔɹaki (the woman), rastrɔpɔti-gɔɹaki (the president)
/tʊ/	inanimate objects or males of animals and men (impolite)	manuh-tʊ (the man – diminutive), gɔɹu-tʊ (the cow)
/ti/	inanimate objects or infants	kesua-ti (the baby)
/ta/	for counting numerals	e-ta (count one), du-ta (count two)
/kʰɔn/	flat square or rectangular objects, big or small, long or short	
/kʰɔni/	terrain like rivers and mountains	
/tʰupi/	small objects	
/zak/	group of people, cattle; also for rain; cyclone	
/sati/	breeze	
/pat/	objects that are thin, flat, wide or narrow.	
/paɦi/	flowers	
/sɔta/	objects that are solid	
/kɔsa/	mass nouns	
/mɔtʰa/	bundles of objects	
/mutʰi/	smaller bundles of objects	
/taɹ/	broomlike objects	
/ɡɔs/	wick-like objects	
/ɡɔsi/	with earthen lamp or old style kerosene lamp used in Assam	
/zʊpa/	objects like trees and shrubs	
/kʰila/	paper and leaf-like objects	
/kʰini/	uncountable mass nouns and pronouns	
/dal/	inanimate flexible/stiff or oblong objects; humans (pejorative)	

In Assamese, classifiers are generally used in the numeral + classifier + noun (e.g. /ezɔn manuh/ ejon manuh 'one man') or the noun + numeral + classifier (e.g. /manuh ezɔn/ manuh ejon 'one man') forms.

=== Nominalisation ===
Most verbs can be converted into nouns by the addition of the suffix /ɔn/. For example, /kʰa/ ('to eat') can be converted to /kʰaɔn/ khaon ('good eating').

=== Grammatical cases ===
Assamese has 8 grammatical cases:

Cases	Suffix	Example
Absolutive	none	বাৰীত গৰু সোমাল। barit góru- xümal. garden-LOC cattle-ABS entered Cattles entered into the garden.
Ergative	-এ, -ই -e, -i	গৰুৱে ঘাঁহ খায়। góru-e ghãh kha-e. cattle-ERG grass-ACC eat-3.HAB.PRES; Cattles eat grass. Note: The personal pronouns without a plural or other suffix are not marked.
Accusative	-(অ)ক, − -(o)k, −	শিয়ালটোৱে শহাটোক খেদি আছে। xial-tü-e xoha-tü-k khedi ase. jackal-the-ERG hare-the-ACC chasing exist-3.PRES.CONT; The jackal is chasing the hare. তেওঁলোকে চোৰটো পুলিচক গতালে। teülük-e sür-tü- pulis-ok gotale. they thief-the-ACC police-ACC handover-REC-3; They handed over the thief to the police.
Genitive	-(অ)ৰ -(o)r	তাইৰ ঘৰ tai-r ghor she-GEN house Her house
Dative	-(অ)লৈ [dialectal: -(অ)লে]; -(অ)ক -(o)lói [dialectal: -(o)le]; -(o)k	সি পঢ়াশালিলৈ গৈ আছে। xi porhaxali-lói gói ase. he school-DAT going exist-3.PRES.CONT; He is going to (the) school. বাক চাবিটো দিয়া। ba-k sabi-tw- dia. {elder sister}-DAT key-the-ACC give-FAM.IMP; Give elder sister the key.
Terminative	-(অ)লৈকে [dialectal: -(অ)লেকে] -(o)lóike [dialectal: -(o)leke]	মই নহালৈকে কʼতো নেযাবা। moi n-oha-lóike kót-ü ne-ja-b-a. I not-coming-TERM where-even not-go-future-3 Don't go anywhere until I don't come. ১ৰ পৰা ৭লৈকে 1-or pora 7-olóike one-GEN from seven-TERM; From 1 up to 7
Instrumental	-(এ)ৰে [dialectal: -(এ)দি] -(e)re [dialectical: -(e)di]	কলমেৰে লিখিছিলা। kolom-ere likhisila. pen-INS write-2.DP; You wrote with (a) pen.
Locative	-(অ)ত [sometimes: -এ] -(o)t [sometimes: -e]	সি বহীখনত লিখিছে। xi bóhi-khon-ot likhise. he notebook-the-LOC write-PRES.PERF.3; He has written on the notebook. আইতা মঙলবাৰে আহিছিল। aita moŋolbar-e ahisil. grandmother Tuesday-LOC come-DP-3; Grandmother came on Tuesday.

=== Pronouns ===
Number	Person	Gender	Pronouns				
Number	Person	Gender	Absolutive Ergative	Accusative Dative	Genitive	Locative	Dative
Singular	1st	m/f (I)	moi	mük	mür	müt	mülói
Singular	2nd	m/f (you)	toi ᵛ tumi ᶠ apuni ᵖ	tük tümak apünak	tür tümar apünar	tüt tümat apünat	tüloi tümalói apünaloi
Singular	3rd	m (he) n (it, that)	i * xi **	iak tak	iar tar	iat tat	ialoi taloi
Singular	3rd	f (she)	ei * tai **	eik taik	eir tair	eit tait	eilói tailói
Singular	3rd	n & p (he/she)	eü/ekhet(-e ᵉ) * teü/tekhet(-e ᵉ) **	eük/ekhetok teük/tekhetok	eür/ekhetor teür/tekhetor	eüt/ekhetot teüt/tekhetot	eüloi/ekhetólói teülói/tekhetólói
Plural	1st	m/f (we)	ami	amak	amar	amat	amalói
Plural	2nd	m/f (you)	tohot(-e ᵉ) ᵛ tümalük(-e ᵉ) ᶠ apünalük(-e ᵉ) ᵖ	tohõtok tümalükok apünalükok	tohõtor tümalükor apünalükor	tohõtot tümalükot apünalükot	tohõtolói tümalükolói apünalükolói
Plural	3rd	m/f (they)	ihõt * eülük/ekhetxokol(-e ᵉ) ᵖ * xihõt ** teülük/tekhetxokol(-e ᵉ) ᵖ **	ihõtok xihotõk eülükok/ekhetxokolok teülükok/tekhetxokolok	ihõtor xihotõr eülükor/ekhetxokolor teülükor/tekhetxokolor	ihõtot xihotõt eülükot/ekhetxokolot teülükot/tekhetxokolot	ihõtoloi xihotõloi eülükok/ekhetxokololoi teülükoloi/tekhetxokololoi
Plural	3rd	n (these, those)	eibür(-e ᵉ) ᵛ * eibilak(-e ᵉ) ᶠ * eixómuh(-e ᵉ) ᵖ * xeibür(-e ᵉ) ᵛ ** xeibilak(-e ᵉ) ᶠ ** xeixómuh(-e) ᵖ **	eibürok eibilakok eixómuhok xeibürok xeibilakok xeixómuhok	eibüror eibilakor eixómuhor xeibüror xeibilakor xeixómuhor	eibürot eibilakot eixómuhot xeibürot xeibilakot xeixómuhot	eibürolói eibilakolói eixómuholói xeibüroloi xeibilakoleó xeixómuhólói

m=male, f=female, n=neuter., *=the person or object is near., **=the person or object is far., v =very familiar, inferior, f=familiar, p=polite, e=ergative form.

=== Tense ===
With consonant ending verb likh (write) and vowel ending verb kha (eat, drink, consume).

Stem	Likh (write)	Kha (eat, drink, consume)
Gerund	Likha	khüa
Causative	Likha	khüa
Conjugative	Likhi	Khai & Kha
Infinitive	Likhibo	Khabo
Goal	Likhibólói	Khabólói
Terminative	Likhibólóike	Khabólóike
Agentive	Likhü̃ta ^{np}/Likhüra ^{mi}/Likhüri ^{fi}	Khaüta ^{np}/Khaüra ^{mi}/Khaüri ^{fi}
Converb	Likhü̃te	Khaü̃te
Progressive	Likhü̃te likhü̃te	Khaü̃te khaü̃te
Reason	Likhat	Khüat
	Likhilot	Khalot
Conditional	Likhile	Khale
Perfective	Likhi	Khai
Habitual	Likhi likhi	Khai khai

For different types of verbs.

Tense	Person	tho "put"		kha "consume"		pi "drink"		de "give"		dhu "wash"		kor "do"		randh "cook"		ah "come"	
Tense	Person	+	-	+	-	+	-	+	-	+	-	+	-	+	-	+	-
Simple Present	1st per.	thoü	nothoü	khaü	nakhaü ~ nekhaü	piü	nipiü	diü	nidiü	dhüü	nüdhüü	korü	nokorü	randhü	narandhü ~ nerandhü	ahü	nahü
Simple Present	2nd per. inf.	thoo	nothoo	khao	nakhao ~ nekhao	pio	nipio	dio	nidio	dhüo	nüdhüo	koro	nokoro	randho	narandho ~ nerandho	aho	naho
Simple Present	2nd per. pol.	thüa	nüthüa	khüa	nükhüa	pia	nipia	dia	nidia	dhüa	nüdhüa	kora	nokora	randha	narandha ~ nerandha	aha	naha
Simple Present	2nd per. hon. & 3rd per.	thoe	nothoe	khae	nakhae ~ nekhae	pie	nipie	die	nidie	dhüe	nüdhüe	kore	nokore	randhe	narandhe ~ nerandhe	ahe	nahe
Present continuous	1st per.	thói asü	thoi thoka nai	khai asü	khai thoka nai	pi asu	pi thoka nai	di asü	di thoka nai	dhui asü	dhui thoka nai	kori asü	kóri thoka nai	randhi asü	randhi thoka nai	ahi asü	ahi thoka nai
Present continuous	2nd per. inf.	thoi aso	thoi thoka nai	khai aso	khai thoka nai	pi aso	pi thoka nai	di aso	di thoka nai	dhui aso	dhui thoka nai	kori aso	kóri thoka nai	randhi aso	randhi thoka nai	ahi aso	ahi thoka nai
Present continuous	2nd per. pol.	thoi asa	thoi thoka nai	khai asa	khai thoka nai	pi asa	pi thoka nai	di asa	di thoka nai	dhui asa	dhui thoka nai	kori asa	kóri thoka nai	randhi asa	randhi thoka nai	ahi asa	ahi thoka nai
Present continuous	2nd per. hon. & 3rd per.	thoi ase	thoi thoka nai	khai ase	khai thoka nai	pi ase	pi thoka nai	di ase	di thoka nai	dhui ase	dhui thoka nai	kori ase	kóri thoka nai	randhi ase	randhi thoka nai	ahi ase	ahi thoka nai
Present Perfect	1st per.	thoisü	thüa nai	khaisü	khwa nai	pisü	pia nai	disü	dia nai	dhui asü	dhwa nai	korisü	kora nai	randhisü	rondha nai	ahi asü	oha nai
Present Perfect	2nd per. inf.	thóisó	thüa nai	khaisó	khwa nai	pisó	pia nai	disó	dia nai	dhuisó	dhwa nai	kórisó	kora nai	randhisó	rondha nai	ahisó	oha nai
Present Perfect	2nd per. pol.	thoisa	thüa nai	khaisa	khwa nai	pisa	pia nai	disa	dia nai	dhuisa	dhwa nai	korisa	kora nai	randhisa	rondha nai	ahisa	oha nai
Present Perfect	2nd per. hon. & 3rd per.	thoise	thüa nai	khaise	khwa nai	pise	pia nai	dise	dia nai	dhuise	dhwa nai	korise	kora nai	randhise	rondha nai	ahise	oha nai
Recent Past	1st per.	thólü	nothólü	khalü	nakhalü ~ nekhalü	pilü	nipilü	dilü	nidilü	dhulü	nudhulü	korilü	nokórilü	randhilü	narandhilü ~ nerandhilü	ahilü	nahilü
Recent Past	2nd per. inf.	thóli	nothóli	khali	nakhali ~ nekhali	pili	nipili	dili	nidili	dhuli	nudhuli	kórili	nókórili	randhili	narandhili ~ nerandhili	ahilü	nahilü
Recent Past	2nd per. pol.	thóla	nothóla	khala	nakhala ~ nekhala	pila	nipila	dila	nidila	dhula	nudhula	kórila	nókórila	randhila	narandhila ~ nerandhila	ahila	nahila
Recent Past	2nd per. hon. & 3rd per.	thóle	nothóle	khale	nakhale ~ nekhale	pile	nipile	dile	nidile	dhule	nudhule	kórile	nókórile	randhile	narandhile ~ nerandhile	ahile / ahil^{tr}	nahile / nahil^{tr}
Distant Past	1st per.	thoisilü	nothoisilü ~ thüa nasilü	khaisilü	nakhaisilü ~ nekhaisilü ~ khwa nasilü	pisilü	nipisilü ~ pia nasilü	disilü	nidisilü ~ dia nasilü	dhuisilü	nudhuisilü ~ dhüa nasilü	kórisilü	nókórisilü ~ kora nasilü	randhisilü	narandhisilü ~ nerandhisilü ~ rondha nasilü	ahisilü	nahisilü ~ oha nasilü
Distant Past	2nd per. inf.	thoisili	nothóisili ~ thüa nasili	khaisili	nakhaisili ~ nekhaisili ~ khwa nasili	pisili	nipisili ~ pia nasili	disili	nidisili ~ dia nasili	dhuisili	nudhuisili ~ dhwa nasili	korisili	nokorisili ~ kora nasili	randhisili	narandhisili ~ nerandhisili ~ rondha nasili	ahisili	nahisili ~ oha nasili
Distant Past	2nd per. pol.	thoisila	nothóisila ~ thüa nasila	khaisila	nakhaisila ~ nekhaisila ~ khüa nasila	pisila	nipisila ~ pia nasila	disila	nidisila ~ dia nasila	dhuisila	nudhuisila ~ dhwa nasila	korisila	nokorisila ~ kora nasila	randhisila	narandhisila ~ nerandhisila ~ rondha nasila	ahisila	nahisila ~ oha nasila
Distant Past	2nd per. hon. & 3rd per.	thoisile	nothoisile ~ thüa nasile	khaisile	nakhaisile ~ nekhaisile ~ khwa nasile	pisile	nipisile ~ pia nasile	disile	nidisile ~ dia nasile	dhuisile	nudhuisile ~ dhüa nasile	korisile	nokorisile ~ kora nasile	randhisile	narandhisile ~ nerandhisile ~ rondha nasile	ahisile	nahisile ~ oha nasile
Past continuous	1st per.	thoi asilü	thoi thoka nasilü	khai asilü	khai thoka nasilü	pi asilü	pi thoka nasilü	di asilü	di thoka nasilü	dhui asils	dhui thoka nasils	kori asils	kori thoka nasils	randhi asils	randhi thoka nasils	ahi asils	ahi thoka nasils
Past continuous	2nd per. inf.	thoi asili	thoi thoka nasili	khai asili	khai thoka nasili	pi asili	pi thoka nasili	di asili	di thoka nasili	dhui asili	dhui thoka nasili	kori asili	kori thoka nasili	randhi asili	randhi thoka nasili	ahi asili	ahi thoka nasili
Past continuous	2nd per. pol.	thoi asila	thoi thoka nasila	khai asila	khai thoka nasila	pi asila	pi thoka nasila	di asila	di thoka nasila	dhui asila	dhui thoka nasila	kori asila	kori thoka nasila	randhi asila	randhi thoka nasila	ahi asila	ahi thoka nasila
Past continuous	2nd per. hon. & 3rd per.	thoi asil(e)	thoi thoka nasil(e)	khai asil(e)	khai thoka nasil(e)	pi asil(e)	pi thoka nasil(e)	di asil(e)	di thoka nasil(e)	dhui asil(e)	dhui thoka nasil(e)	kori asil(e)	kori thoka nasil(e)	randhi asil(e)	randhi thoka nasil(e)	ahi asil{e)	ahi thoka nasil(e)
Simple Future	1st per.	thóm	nothóm	kham	nakham ~ nekham	pim	nipim	dim	nidim	dhum	nudhum	korim	nokorim	randhim	narandhim ~ nerandhim	ahim	nahim
Simple Future	2nd per. inf.	thóbi	nothóbi	khabi	nakhabi ~ nekhabi	pibi	nipibi	dibi	nidibi	dhubi	nudhubi	koribi	nokoribi	randhibi	narandhibi ~ nerandhibi	ahibi	nahibi
Simple Future	2nd per. pol.	thóba	nothóba	khaba	nakhaba ~ nekhaba	piba	nipiba	diba	nidiba	dhuba	nudhuba	koriba	nókóriba	randhiba	narandhiba ~ nerandhiba	ahiba	nahiba
Simple Future	2nd per. hon. & 3rd per.	thóbo	nothóbo	khabo	nakhabo ~ nekhabo	pibo	nipibo	dibo	nidibo	dhubo	nudhubo	koribo	nokoribo	randhibo	narandhibo ~ nerandhibo	ahibo	nahibo
Future continuous	1st per.	thoi thakim	thoi nathakim/nethakim	khai thakim	khai nathakim/nethakim	pi thakim	pi nathakim/nethakim	di thakim	di nathakim/nethakim	dhui thakim	dhui nathakim/nethakim	kori thakim	kori nathakim/nethakim	randhi thakim	randhi nathakim/nethakim	ahi thakim	ahi nathakim/nethakim
Future continuous	2nd per. inf.	thoi thakibi	thoi nathakibi/nethakibi	khai thakibi	khai nathakibi/nethakibi	pi thakibi	pi nathakibi/nethakibi	di thakibi	di nathakibi/nethakibi	dhui thakibi	dhui nathakibi/nethakibi	kori thakibi	kori nathakibi/nethakibi	randhi thakibi	randhi nathakibi/nethakibi	ahi thakibi	ahi nathakibi/nethakibi
Future continuous	2nd per. pol.	thoi thakiba	thoi nathakiba/nethakiba	khai thakiba	khai nathakiba/nethakiba	pi thakiba	pi nathakiba/nethakiba	di thakiba	di nathakiba/nethakiba	dhui thakiba	dhui nathakiba/nethakiba	kori thakiba	kori nathakiba/nethakiba	randhi thakiba	randhi nathakiba/nethakiba	ahi thakiba	ahi nathakiba/nethakiba
Future continuous	2nd per. hon. & 3rd per.	thoi thakibo	thoi nathakibo/nethakibo	khai thakibo	khai nathakibo/nethakibo	pi thakibo	pi nathakibo/nethakibo	di thakibo	di nathakibo/nethakibo	dhui thakibo	dhui nathakibo/nethakibo	kori thakibo	kori nathakibo/nethakibo	randhi thakibo	randhi nathakibo/nethakibo	ahi thakibo	ahi nathakibo/nethakibo

=== Negation process ===
Verbs in Assamese are negated by adding /n/ before the verb, with /n/ picking up the initial vowel of the verb. For example:

- /na laɡɛ/ 'do(es) not want' (1st, 2nd and 3rd persons)
- /ni likʰʊ̃/ 'will not write' (1st person)
- /nukutʊ̃/ 'will not nibble' (1st person)
- /nɛlɛkʰɛ/ 'does not count' (3rd person)
- /nɔkɔɹɔ/ 'do not do' (2nd person)

For verbs that start with a vowel, just the n- is added, without vowel lengthening. In some dialects if the 1st vowel is a in a verb that starts with consonant, ne is used, like, Moi nakhaw (I don't eat) is Moi nekhaü. In past continuous the negative form is -i thoka nasil-. In future continuous it's -i na(/e)thaki-. In present continuous and present perfect, just -i thoka nai and -a nai' respectively are used for all personal pronouns. Sometimes for plural pronouns, the -hok suffix is used, like korwhok (we do), ahilahok (you guys came).

=== Relationship suffixes ===
Persons	Suffix	Example	English translation
1st person	none	Mwr/Amar ma, bap, kokai, vai, ba, voni	My/Our mother, father, elder-brother, younger-brother, elder-sister, younger-sister
2nd person (very familiar; inferior)	-(e)r	Twr/Tohõtor mar, baper, kokaier, vaier, bar, vonier	Your/Your(pl) mother, father, elder-brother, younger-brother, elder-sister, younger-sister
2nd person familiar	-(e)ra	Twmar/Twmalwkor mara, bapera, kokaiera, vaiera, bara, voniera	Your/Your(pl) mother, father, elder-brother, younger-brother, elder-sister, younger-sister
2nd person formal; 3rd person	-(e)k	Apwnar/Apwnalwkor/Tar/Tair/Xihotõr/Tewr mak, bapek, kokaiek, bhaiek, bak, voniek	Your/Your(pl)/His/Her/Their/His~Her(formal) mother, father, elder-brother, younger-brother, elder-sister, younger-sister

Kinship Terms

Some Assamese Kinship Terms with IPA and English Equivalents

Sr. No.	Assamese Word	IPA	English Word
1	দেউতা	/dɛuta/	Father
2	আই/মা	/ai/ /mɑ/	Mother
3	দাদা	/dada/	Elder Brother
4	ভাই	/bhai/	Younger Brother
5	বাইদেউ	/bɑɪ.dɛʊ/	Elder Sister
6	ভনী	/bhɔni/	Younger Sister
7	পুতেক	/putɛk/	Son
8	জীয়ৰী	/ziːɔɾi/	Daughter
9	ককা	/kɔka/	Paternal Grandfather
10	আইতা	/aita/	Paternal Grandmother
11	কাকা	/kaka/	Uncle (Father’s younger brother)
12	খুৰা	/kʰuɾa/	Uncle (Father’s elder brother)
13	খুৰী	/kʰuɾi/	Aunt (Father’s brother’s wife)
14	পেহা	/peɦa/	Uncle (Father’s younger sister’s husband)
15	পেহী	/pɛ.ɦi/	Aunt (Father’s younger sister)
16	কাকা	/kɔka/	Maternal Grandfather
17	আইতা	/aita/	Maternal Grandmother
18	মামা	/mɑː.mɑː/	Uncle (Mother’s brother)
19	মামী	/ma.mi/	Aunt (Mother’s brother’s wife)
20	মহা	/mɔ.ɦaˈ/	Uncle (Mother’s younger sister’s husband)
21	মাহী	/ma.ɦi/	Aunt (Mother’s younger sister)
22	শহুৰ	/xoɦʊɾ/	Father-in-law
23	শাহু	/xa.ɦu/	Mother-in-law
24	দেওৰ	/d̪eː.ɔɾ/	Brother-in-law (Husband’s younger brother)
25	ননদ	/ nɔnɔd /	Sister-in-law (Husband’s younger sister)
26	খুলশালি	/K^{h}ulxali/	Brother-in-law (Wife’s younger brother)
27	খুলশালি	/K^{h}ulxali/	Sister-in-law (Wife’s younger sister)

== Dialects ==
The varieties of Assamese.

=== Regional dialects ===
The language has quite a few regional variations. Banikanta Kakati identified two broad dialects which he named (1) Eastern and (2) Western dialects, of which the eastern dialect is homogeneous, and prevalent to the east of Guwahati, and the western dialect is heterogeneous. However, recent linguistic studies have identified four dialect groups and one dialect isolate listed below from east to west to south:

- Eastern group in and around the undivided Sivasagar district (Golaghat, Jorhat, Majuli, Charaideo and Sivasagar) and the former undivided Lakhimpur district (Dibrugarh, Tinsukia, Lakhimpur and Dhemaji. Standard Assamese is based on the Eastern group.
- Central group spoken in Nagaon, Sonitpur, Morigaon districts and adjoining areas
- Kamrupi group in the Kamrup region: (Barpetia, Nalbariya, Palasbaria)
- Goalpariya group in the Goalpara region: (Ghulliya, Jharuwa, Caruwa)
- Cachar dialect (Dehan) in Cachar district of Barak valley

=== Samples ===
Collected from the book, Assamese – Its formation and development. The text below is from the Parable of the Prodigal Son. The translations are of different versions of the English translations:

English: A man had two sons. The younger son told his father, 'I want my share of your estate now before you die.' So his father agreed to divide his wealth between his sons. A few days later this younger son packed all his belongings and moved to a distant land, and there he wasted all his money in wild living. About the time his money ran out, a great famine swept over the land, and he began to starve. He persuaded a local farmer to hire him, and the man sent him into his fields to feed the pigs. The young man became so hungry that even the pods he was feeding the pigs looked good to him. But no one gave him anything.

Eastern Assamese (Sibsagar): Künü ejon manuhor duta putek asil, tare xorutüe bapekok kole, "Oi büpai! xompottir ji bhag moi paü tak mük diok!" Tate teü teür xompotti duiü putekor bhitorot bati dile. Olop dinor pasot xorutw puteke tar bhagot ji pale take loi dur dexoloi goi beisali kori gutei xompotti nax korile. Tar pasot xei dexot bor akal hól. Tate xi dux paboloi dhorile. Tetia xi goi xei dexor ejon manuhor asroy lole, aru xei manuhe tak gahori soraboloi potharoloi pothai dile. Tate xi gahorir khüa ebidh gosor seire pet bhoraboloi bor hepah korileü tak küneü ekü nidile.

Central Assamese: Manuh ejonor duta putak asil. Tahãtor vitorot xoutw putake bapekok kóle,

Central/Kamrupi (Pati Darrang): Eta manhur duta putak asil, xehatör xorutui bapakök kolak, "He pite, xompöttir mör bhagöt zikhini porei, take mök di." Tate teö nizör xompötti xehatök bhagei dilak. Tar olop dinör pasötei xeñ xoru putektüi xokolöke götei loi kömba dexok legi polei gel aru tate lompot kamöt götei urei dilak. Xi xokolö bioe koraõte xeñ dexöt bor akal hol. Xi tate bor kosto paba dhollak. Teten xi aru xeñ dexor eta manhur asroe lolak. Xeñ mantui nizör potharök legi tak bora saribak legi pothei dilak. Tate xi aru borai khawa ekbidh gasör sei di pet bhorabak legi bor hepah kollak. Kintu kawei ekö tak nedlak.

Kamrupi (Palasbari): Kunba eta manhur duta putak asil. Ekdin xortö putake bapiakok kola, "Bapa wa, apunar xompöttir moi bhagöt zeman kheni pam teman khini mök dia." Tethane bapiake nizör xompötti duö putakok bhage dila. Keidinman pasöt xörtö putake tar bhagtö loi kunba akhan durher dekhok gel, aru tate gundami köri tar götei makha xompötti nohoa koilla. Tar pasöt xiai dekhot mosto akal hol. Tethian xi bor dukh paba dhoilla. Tar xi tarei eta manhur osarök zai asroe asroe lola. Manhtöi tak bara sarba potharöl khedala. Tate xi barai khawa ekbidh gasör seṅ khaba dhoilla. Teö tak kayö akö khaba neidla.

Kamrupi (Barpeta): Kunba eta manhör duta putek asil. Ekdin xorutu puteke bapekök kolak, "Pita, amar xompöttir moi zikhini mör bhagöt paü xikhini mök dia." Tethen bapeke nizör xompötti tahak bhage dilak. Tare keidinmen pisöte xei xoru putektui tar gotexopake loi ekhen duhrer dekhök gusi gel, arö tate xi lompot hoi tar gotexopa xompöttike ure phellak. Tar pasöt xei dekhkhenöt mosto akal hol. Tethen xi xei dekhör eta manhör osröt zai asroe lolak. Manuhtui tak bara sarbak login patharök khedolak. Tate xi ekbidh barai khawa gasör sẽi khaba dhollak. Take dekhiö kayö tak ekö khaba nedlak.

Kamrupi (Bongaigaon): Eta manur duta beta asil. Xoru beta gote tar bapok koisil, "Baba moy xompottir jikhini bhag pang xikhini mok dek toy/apuni morar agote". Bap gote xompotti khini nijor beta koytar majot bhag kori dewar karne manti hol. Koydin man pasot xoru beta go nijor bostu khini loya kobat durot jaya nijor gotae poisa gidi uray felal. Tae poisa makha xek koria felar pasote tamar tar tate thikse khawar obhab hol. Xibar tae osorore khetiyok etar tate kam korbar krne gise aro tak tate gahori gilak ahar khuwawa kam disil. Xei soli go bhokote gahorir ahar makhake khaise. Xei dekhiyao tak kahoy eko khaba nedil.

Western Goalpariya (Salkocha): Kunö ekzon mansir duizon saöa asil. Tar sötotae bapok koil, "Baba sompöttir ze bhag mör, tak mök de." Tat oë nizer sompötti umak batia dil. Tar olpo din pasöte öi söta saöata sök götea dur desot gel. Ore lompot beboharot or sompötti uzar koril. Oë götay khoros korar pasöt oi desot boro akal hoil. Ote oya kosto paba dhoril. Sela oë zaya öi deser ekzon mansir asroe löat öi manusi ok suar soraba patharot pothea dil. Ote suare khaöa ek rokom gaser sal dia pet bhoroba saileö ok kaho kisu nadil.

=== Non-regional dialects ===
Assamese does not have many caste- or occupation-based dialects. In the nineteenth century, the Eastern dialect became the standard dialect because it witnessed more literary activity and it was more uniform from east of Guwahati to Sadiya, whereas the western dialects were more heterogeneous. Since the nineteenth century, the centre of literary activity (as well as of politics and commerce) has shifted to Guwahati; as a result, the standard dialect has evolved considerably away from the largely rural Eastern dialects and has become more urban and acquired western dialectal elements. Most literary activity takes place in this dialect, and is often called the likhito-bhaxa, though regional dialects are often used in novels and other creative works.

In addition to the regional variants, sub-regional, community-based dialects are also prevalent, namely:

- Standard dialect influenced by surrounding centres.
- Bhakatiya dialect highly polite, a sattra-based dialect with a different set of nominals, pronominals, and verbal forms, as well as a preference for euphemism; indirect and passive expressions. Some of these features are used in the standard dialect on very formal occasions.
- The fisherman community has a dialect that is used in the central and eastern region.
- The astrologer community of Darrang district has a dialect called thar that is coded and secretive. The ratikhowa and bhitarpanthiya secretive cult-based Vaisnava groups too have their own dialects.
- The Muslim community have their own dialectal preference, with their own kinship, custom, and religious terms, with those in east Assam having distinct phonetic features.
- The urban adolescent and youth communities (for example, Guwahati) have exotic, hybrid and local slangs.
- Ethnic speech communities that use Assamese as a second language, often use dialects that are influenced heavily by the pronunciation, intonation, stress, vocabulary and syntax of their respective first languages (Mising Eastern Assamese, Bodo Central Kamrupi, Rabha Eastern Goalpariya etc.). Two independent pidgins/creoles, associated with the Assamese language, are Nagamese (used by Naga groups) and Nefamese (used in Arunachal Pradesh).

== Literature ==
There is a growing and strong body of literature in this language. The first characteristics of this language are seen in the Charyapadas composed in between the eighth and twelfth centuries. The first examples emerged in writings of court poets in the fourteenth century, the finest example of which is Madhav Kandali's Saptakanda Ramayana. The popular ballad in the form of Ojapali is also regarded as well-crafted. The sixteenth and seventeenth centuries saw a flourishing of Vaishnavite literature, leading up to the emergence of modern forms of literature in the late nineteenth century.

== See also ==
- Assamese Manipuri language
- Indo-Aryan languages
- Languages of India
- Languages with official status in India
- List of Indian languages by total speakers
- List of languages by number of native speakers
- List of people from Western Assam
- Assamese Language Movement
- Assamese people
