= Nefamese language =

Language of Arunachal Pradesh, India

Nefamese
- Arunamese
- Native to: Arunachal Pradesh
- Native speakers: unknown (2006)
- Language family: Assamese-based pidgin

Language codes
- ISO 639-3: nef
- Glottolog: nefa1235

Nefamese or Arunamese is a pidgin of Arunachal Pradesh (formerly NEFA), India. Its classification is unclear; Ethnologue states that it is based on the Assamese language, but also that it is most closely related to the Sino-Tibetan Gallong like the Assamese language formed out by the mixture of languages like Austroasiatic, Tibeto-Burman, Tai and Indo-European family of languages.

Nefamese emerged in eastern Arunachal Pradesh as a lingua franca among the Nyishi, Adi, Apatanai, Khampti, Hill Miri, Idu Mishimi, Nocte, Wancho, Tagin, Mompa, Zakhring, and Bugun peoples, among others—between them and with other Indigenous Assamese people and other Indigenous groups of Northeast India. The language is threatened by, and has perhaps somewhat been replaced by, the use of Hindi.

== Phonology ==
Consonants
	Labial	Alveolar	Palatal	Velar	Glottal
Plosive	p b	t d	tʃ dʒ	k g	
Fricative		s	ʃ		h
Nasal	m	n		ŋ	
Approximant	w	r, l	j		

Vowels
	Front	Central	Back
High	i		u
Mid	e	ə	o
Low		aː	

== See also ==
- Nagamese Creole
