= East African Community =

Intergovernmental organisation for African countries

(in other official languages)
French	Communauté d'Afrique de l'Est
Luganda	ekitundu ky’obuvanjuba bwa Afrika
Lingala	Lisanga ya Afrika ya Est
Kinyarwanda	Umuryango w’Ibihugu by’Iburasirazuba bw’Afurika
Somali	Bulshada Bariga Afrika
Swahili	Jumuiya ya Afrika Mashariki
- Flag Emblem
- Motto: "Jumuyia Africa Mashariki"
- Anthem: "Wimbo wa Jumuiya Afrika Mashariki"
- An orthographic map projection of the world, highlighting the East African Community's member states (green)
- Headquarters: Arusha, Tanzania; 3°22′S 36°41′E
- Largest city: Kinshasa, DR Congo
- Official languages: English
- Lingua franca: Swahili, French
- Demonym: East African
- Type: Intergovernmental
- Partner states: 8 states: Burundi; DR Congo; Kenya; Rwanda; Somalia; South Sudan; Tanzania; Uganda

Leaders
  - Summit Chairperson: (Uganda) Yoweri Museveni
  - Council Chairperson: (Uganda) Jeje Odongo
  - EACJ President: (Burundi) Nestor Kayobera
  - EALA Speaker: (Burundi) Joseph Ntakarutimana
  - Secretary General: (Tanzania) Stephen Mbundi
- Legislature: Legislative Assembly

Establishment
  - First established: 1967
  - Dissolved: 1977
  - Re-established: 7 July 2000

Area
  - Total: 5,449,717 km^{2} (2,104,147 sq mi)
  - Water (%): 3.83

Population
  - 2026 estimate: 362,774,585
  - Density: 66.5/km^{2} (172.2/sq mi)
- GDP (PPP): 2026 estimate
  - Total: ▲$1.34 trillion
  - Per capita: ▲$3,687
- GDP (nominal): 2026 estimate
  - Total: ▲$490.94 billion
  - Per capita: ▲$1,353
- HDI (2023): 0.512 low
- Website www.eac.int

The East African Community (EAC) is an intergovernmental organisation in East Africa. The EAC's membership consists of eight states: the Democratic Republic of the Congo, the Federal Republic of Somalia, and the Republics of Burundi, Kenya, Rwanda, South Sudan, Uganda, and Tanzania. Yoweri Museveni, the president of Uganda, is the current EAC chairman. The organisation was founded in 1967, collapsed in 1977, and was revived on 7 July 2000. The main objective of the EAC is to foster regional economic integration between the organisation's member states.

In 2008, after negotiations with the Southern African Development Community (SADC) and the Common Market for Eastern and Southern Africa (COMESA), the EAC agreed to an expanded free trade area including the member states of all three organisations. The EAC is an integral part of the African Economic Community.

The EAC is a potential precursor to the establishment of the East African Federation, a proposed federation of its members into a single sovereign state. In 2010, the EAC launched its own common market for goods, labour, and capital within the region, with the goal of creating a common currency and eventually a full political federation with its capital at Arusha, Tanzania. In 2013, a protocol was signed outlining their plans for launching a monetary union within 10 years. In September 2018, a committee was formed to begin the process of drafting a regional constitution.

== History ==
=== Formation and re-formation ===
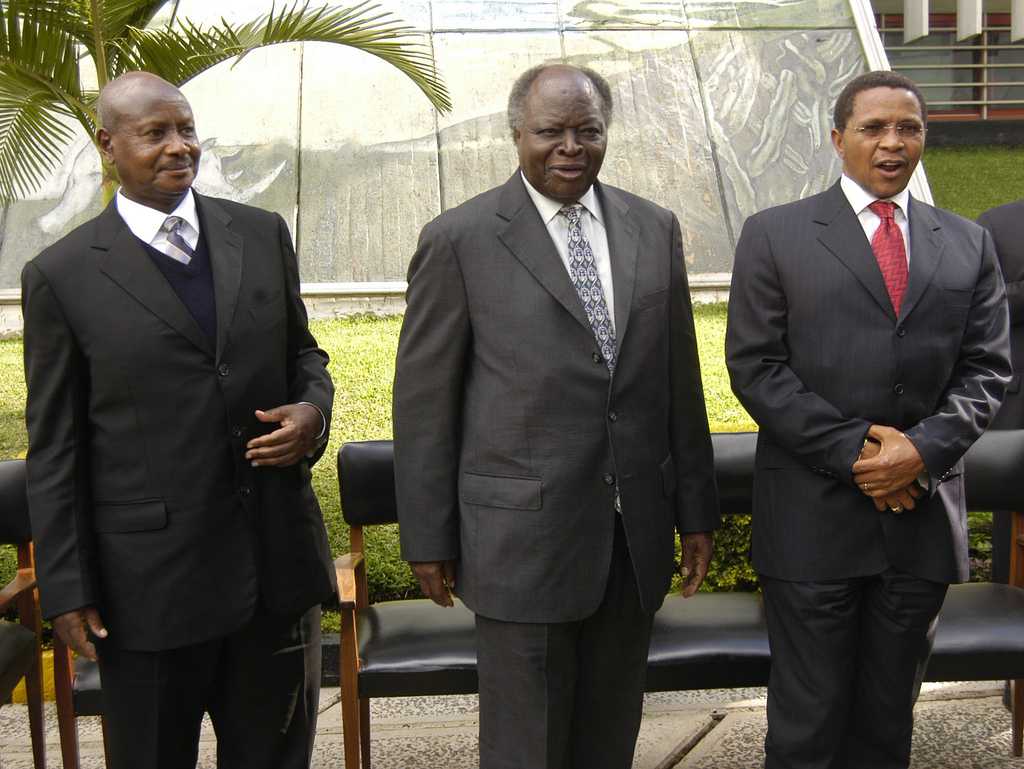
From left to right: President Yoweri Museveni of Uganda, President Mwai Kibaki of Kenya, and President Jakaya Kikwete of Tanzania during the eighth EAC summit in Arusha, November 2006.

Kenya, Tanzania, and Uganda have cooperated with each other since the early 20th century. The East African Currency Board provided a common currency from 1919 to 1966. The customs union between Kenya and Uganda in 1917, which Tanganyika joined in 1927, was followed by the East African High Commission (EAHC) from 1948 to 1961, the East African Common Services Organization (EACSO) from 1961 to 1967, and the EAC from 1967 to 1977. Burundi and Rwanda joined the EAC on 6 July 2009.

Inter-territorial co-operation between the Kenya Colony, the Uganda Protectorate, and the Tanganyika Territory was formalised in 1948 by the EAHC. This provided a customs union, a common external tariff, currency, and postage. It also dealt with common services in transport and communications, research, and education. Following independence, these integrated activities were reconstituted and the EAHC was replaced by the EACSO, which many observers thought would lead to a political federation between the three territories. The new organisation ran into difficulties because of the lack of joint planning and fiscal policy, separate political policies, and Kenya's dominant economic position.

In 1964, the states of Tanganyika and the Sultanate of Zanzibar would unite to form the Republic of Tanzania. In 1967, the EACSO was superseded by the EAC. This body aimed to strengthen the ties between the members through a common market, a common customs tariff, and a range of public services to achieve balanced economic growth within the region.

In 1977, the EAC collapsed. The causes of the collapse included demands by Kenya for more seats than Uganda and Tanzania in decision-making organs, disagreements with Ugandan dictator Idi Amin who demanded that Tanzania as a member state of the EAC should not harbour forces fighting to topple the government of another member state, and the disparate economic systems of socialism in Tanzania and capitalism in Kenya. The three member states lost over sixty years of co-operation and the benefits of economies of scale, although some Kenyan government officials celebrated the collapse with champagne.

Presidents Daniel arap Moi of Kenya, Ali Hassan Mwinyi of Tanzania, and Yoweri Kaguta Museveni of Uganda signed the Treaty for East African Co-operation in Kampala on 30 November 1993 and established a Tri-partite Commission for Co-operation. A process of re-integration was embarked on involving tripartite programs of co-operation in political, economic, social and cultural fields, research and technology, defence, security, and legal and judicial affairs.

The EAC was revived on 30 November 1999, when the treaty for its re-establishment was signed, with its budget equally contributed to by the three member states. It came into force on 7 July 2000, 23 years after the collapse of the previous community and its organs. A customs union was signed in March 2004, which commenced on 1 January 2005. Kenya, the region's largest exporter, continued to pay duties on goods entering the other four countries on a declining scale until 2010. A common system of tariffs will apply to goods imported from third-party countries. On 30 November 2016 it was declared that the immediate aim would be confederation rather than federation.

=== South Sudan's accession ===
The presidents of Kenya and Rwanda invited the Autonomous Government of Southern Sudan to apply for membership upon the independence of South Sudan in 2011, and South Sudan was reportedly an applicant country as of mid-July 2011. Analysts suggested that South Sudan's early efforts to integrate infrastructure, including rail links and oil pipelines, with systems in Kenya and Uganda indicated intention on the part of Juba to pivot away from dependence on Sudan and toward the EAC. Reuters considers South Sudan the likeliest candidate for EAC expansion in the short term, and an article in Tanzanian daily The Citizen that reported East African Legislative Assembly Speaker Abdirahin Haithar Abdi said South Sudan was "free to join the EAC" asserted that analysts believe the country will soon become a full member of the regional body.

On 17 September 2011, the Daily Nation quoted a South Sudanese MP as saying that while his government was eager to join the EAC, it would likely delay its membership over concerns that its economy was not sufficiently developed to compete with EAC member states and could become a "dumping ground" for Kenyan, Tanzanian, and Ugandan exports. This was contradicted by President Salva Kiir, who announced that South Sudan had begun the application process one month later. The application was deferred by the EAC in December 2012, however incidents with Ugandan boda-boda operators in South Sudan have created political tension and may delay the process.

In December 2012, Tanzania agreed to South Sudan's bid to join the EAC, clearing the way for the world's newest state to become the regional bloc's sixth member. In May 2013 the EAC set aside $82,000 USD for the admission of South Sudan into the bloc even though admission may not happen until 2016. The process, to start after the EAC Council of Ministers meeting in August 2013, was projected to take at least four years. At the 14th Ordinary Summit held in Nairobi in 2012, EAC heads of state approved the verification report that was presented by the Council of Ministers, then directed it to start the negotiation process with South Sudan.

A team was formed to assess South Sudan's bid; however, in April 2014, the nation requested a delay in the admissions process, presumably due to ongoing internal conflict.

South Sudan's Minister of Foreign Affairs, Barnaba Marial Benjamin, claimed publicly in October 2015 that, following evaluations and meetings of a special technical committee in May, June, August, September and October, the committee has recommended that South Sudan be allowed to join the East African Community. Those recommendations, however, had not been released to the public. It was reported that South Sudan could be admitted as early as November 2015 when the heads of East African States had their summit meeting.

South Sudan was eventually approved for membership to the bloc in March 2016, and signed a treaty of accession in April 2016. It had six months to ratify the agreement, which it did on 5 September, at which point it formally acceded to the community. It does not yet participate to the same extent as the other members.

=== Democratic Republic of the Congo's accession ===
In 2010, Tanzanian officials expressed interest in inviting the DR Congo to join the East African Community. The DRC applied for admission to the EAC in June 2019. In June 2021, the EAC Summit launched a verification mission to assess the suitability of the DRC for admission to the Community, and has since drafted a report on their findings which is ready for submission to the EAC Council of Ministers. On 23 November 2021: Ministers in charge of East African Community (EAC) Affairs have recommended for consideration by the EAC Heads of States the report of the verification team on the application by The Democratic Republic of Congo (DRC) to join the Community. In February 2022, the EAC Council of Ministers recommended that the DRC be admitted as a new member state of the EAC. On 18 March 2022, the EAC Secretary-General Peter Mathuki confirmed that the Heads of State would approve the admission on 29 March 2022. The Democratic Republic of the Congo was admitted as a member of the EAC on 29 March 2022, at a virtual Head of State summit chaired by Uhuru Kenyatta of Kenya, and officially became a member of the East African Community on 11 July 2022 after depositing the instrument of ratification with the EAC Secretary General at the bloc's headquarters in Arusha, Tanzania. The accession of the DRC gives the EAC its first port on the West African coast. The DRC, contrary to the terms of accession, refused to contribute any sum toward the budget until 2024, when it remitted US$1 million, despite owing over US$20 million.

=== Somalia's accession ===
Representatives of Somalia applied for membership in the EAC in March 2012. The application was considered by the EAC Heads of State in December 2012, which requested that the EAC Council work with Somalia to verify their application. In February 2015, the EAC again deliberated on the matter but deferred a decision as verification had not yet started nor had preparations with the Somali government been finalised. During the 22nd Ordinary EAC Heads of State Summit on 22 July 2022, the EAC Heads of State, noted that the verification process for Somalia to join the community needs to be completed expeditiously. In 2023, East African Community (EAC) Secretary-General Peter Mathuki said Somalia had made a critical step towards becoming the eighth member of the bloc, with negotiations on admission set to last from 22 August to 5 September. Somalia was formally invited to join on 24 November 2023 during the 23rd ordinary summit of the heads of state, following a five-hour closed-door meeting. The treaty of accession was signed on 15 December 2023 at the presidential residence in Kampala, Uganda, with Somalia having 6 months to complete its ratification of the treaty after which it would officially become a member. On February 10, 2024, Somalia's Parliament endorsed the treaty of accession. Somalia deposited its instruments of ratification on 4 March 2024, thus becoming the eighth member of the organisation.

During this period, only Kenya and Tanzania did not have recurring arrears in re budget contribution. Reasons for these arrears are primarily due to two factors: Failure to enforce contributions via sanctions outlined in the treaty, and that member states's contributions to the budget were equal despite their varying sizes and GDPs. The budget for financial year 2024/25 was US$112.98 million, a 8.7% increase from the last financial year, and the majority of the increase attributed to Somalia's accession.

At the 23rd Ordinary summit in 2023, they agreed on a new financing model in which 65% of the budget is contributed to equally, while the remaining 35% is contributed to on the basis of each member states' respective average nominal GDP in the past five years as assessed by the World Bank. The ratio of the contributions has since changed to be 50/50. Somalia's share of the contribution is now US$5.8 million, down from the US$7.8 contribution it owed in the old scheme.

== Partner states ==
Overview of partner states in the East African Community
Country	Capital	Accession	Population	Area (km^{2})	GDP (USD)	GDP per capita	GDP (PPP)	PPP per capita
Burundi	Gitega	2007	13,590,102	27,834	▲$8.14	▲$546	▲$15.36	▲$1,031
DR Congo	Kinshasa	2022	115,403,027	2,344,858	▲$123.4	▲$1,122	▲$235.9	▲$2,144
Kenya	Nairobi	2000	58,246,378	580,367	▲$147.3	▲$2,714	▲$435.2	▲$8,020
Rwanda	Kigali	2007	13,623,302	26,338	▲$17.34	▲$1,198	▲$65.46	▲$4,523
Somalia	Mogadishu	2024	19,655,000	637,657	▲$14.17	▲$813	▲$34.12	▲$1,956
South Sudan	Juba	2016	12,703,714	644,329	▲$6.07	▲$488	▲$19.16	▲$1,540
Tanzania	Dodoma	2000	67,462,121	945,087	▲$94.89	▲$1,362	▲$320.8	▲$4,607
Uganda	Kampala	2000	49,283,041	241,550	▲$73.37	▲$1,476	▲$208.4	▲$4,192

=== Potential expansion ===
==== Comoros ====
In July 2023 Kenyan President William Ruto raised the idea of Comoros joining the EAC while signing an agreement for deeper bilateral cooperation between Kenya and Comoros. Comoros and existing member Tanzania have a maritime border.

==== Djibouti ====
With Somalia set to join the group in October 2023, Secretary General Peter Mathuki stated, “The vision of our leaders is to have a market of 800 million people. And that will be possible if we integrate all the countries in the horn of Africa and make one huge market,” hinting of the possible accession of Djibouti and Ethiopia.

==== Ethiopia ====
Kenyan President Uhuru Kenyatta proposed expanding the EAC to include Central, Northern, and Southern African states, such as Ethiopia. The potential joining of Ethiopia into the EAC would bring the population to approximately 460 million. Speaking at the opening of the One Stop Border post in Moyale in 2020, Prime Minister Abiy Ahmed of Ethiopia affirmed his commitment to regional integration saying that the east African people are one people and economic integration is a key goal for the region to achieve so as to unlock its potential. With other horn of Africa countries like Somalia joining the EAC and the opening up of Ethiopia's sectors such as banking and telecommunications to the private sector, being part of the EAC could soon become a priority to accelerate economic gains. In April 2023, Secretary General Peter Mathuki suggested the EAC should consider admitting Ethiopia following Somalia's accession. On 8 April 2024, Ministry of EAC Arid and Semi-arid Lands and Regional Development Cabinet Secretary Peninah Malonza claimed the EAC and Ethiopia were in the final stages of negotiation for admission into the bloc. This was later contradicted by Ethiopian Ministry of Foreign Affairs spokesperson Nebiu Tedla who said that Ethiopia had made no request to join the EAC and that "the information is baseless."

==== Malawi ====
In 2010, Tanzanian officials expressed interest in inviting Malawi to join the EAC. Former Malawian Foreign Affairs Minister Etta Banda said, however, that there were no formal negotiations taking place concerning Malawian membership.

==== Sudan ====
Sudan applied to join the EAC in 2011, with Burundi, Kenya, and Rwanda supporting membership, while Tanzania and Uganda were opposed to it. They contended that because of the Sudan's lack of a direct border with the EAC at the time, its allegedly discriminatory actions toward black Africans, its record of human rights violations, and its history of hostilities with both South Sudan and Uganda, Sudan was ineligible to join and their application was rejected in December 2012.

== EAC Organs ==
The Treaty for the Establishment of the East African Community established seven EAC Organs to perform the functions of the community.

=== The Summit ===
Period	Chairman
2012–2013	(Uganda) Yoweri Museveni
2013–2015	(Kenya) Uhuru Kenyatta
2015–2017	(Tanzania) John Magufuli
2017–2019	(Uganda) Yoweri Museveni
2019–2021	(Rwanda) Paul Kagame
2021–2022	(Kenya) Uhuru Kenyatta
2022–2023	(Burundi) Évariste Ndayishimiye
2023–2024	(South Sudan) Salva Kiir
2024-2026	(Kenya) William Ruto
2026–Present	(Uganda) Yoweri Museveni

The Summit consists of the heads of state of each individual member country. The Summit gives "strategic direction towards the realisation of the goal and objectives of the Community," and convenes once per year, with additional meetings at request of any member of the Summit. The Summit's decisions are arrived at by consensus. The Chairperson of the Summit's tenure is one year and is in rotation from among the partner states. At Summit meetings, the Summit reviews annual progress reports and other reports from the Council. The summit appoints East African Court of Justice judges, assents to bills, and admits new member or observer states. The Summit may delegate many but not all of its powers to lower organs at the discretion of the Summit. The President of Uganda, Yoweri Museveni, serves as the current EAC Summit Chairperson.

=== The Council ===
The Council consists of the Minister responsible for EAC affairs of each member State, any other Minister of the member state the member state elects; and the Attorney General of each Partner State. The Council meets twice a year, one time directly after the Summit and once later in the year. The Council can also meet at the request of the Council Chairperson or member state. The Council main function is to implement decisions made by the Summit. The Council initiates and submits Bills to the Assembly, gives directions to the Partner States, and makes regulations, issues directives, and makes recommendations to all other organs (except the Summit, the Court, and the Assembly). The Council also can establish Sectoral Committees from amongst its members to implement specific directives. Deng Alor Kuol, the Minister for East African Community Affairs in South Sudan, is the current Chairperson of the EAC Council of Ministers. This position of Lead Council Chairperson is elected by the Head of State, and is replaced annually.

=== The Coordination Committee ===
The Co-ordination Committee consists of the Permanent Secretaries of EAC affairs in each member state and any other Permanent Secretaries as determined by the member state. The Coordination Committee meets at least twice a year preceding the meetings of the Council. The Coordination Committee implements the directives decided by the Council and recommends the creation of Sectoral Committees to the Council. The current acting Principal Secretary of the Coordinating Committee is Dr. Kevit Desai of Kenya.

=== East African Court of Justice ===
The East African Court of Justice (EACJ) is the judicial arm of the community and consists of the First Instance Division and an Appellate Division. The Judges are appointed by the Summit from candidates recommended by the member states provided there are no more than two judges of a member state on the First Instance Division and no more than one judge of a member state on the Appellate Division. The court is composed of a maximum of fifteen judges with no more than ten of the First Instance Division and no more than five of the Appellate Division. Each Judge may serve for no more than seven years and holds office until that period expires, death, reaching seventy years-of-age, or removal for misconduct by the Summit after deliberation from a tribunal, bankruptcy, or conviction. Upon suspension, the judge's member state recommends a qualified candidate for appointment to temporary judge. If a judge has a conflict-of-interest, they are to report to their higher-up for deliberation on their ability to fairly judge. The court has jurisdiction over cases involving interpretation and application of the treaty, other jurisdiction as designated by the Summit, member states that consider another member state or EAC Organ to have failed obligations under the treaty, and disputes between the EAC and its employees. The Summit, the Council, or a Partner State may also request the Court to give an advisory opinion on an issue regarding the Treaty. Currently, the court meets on a quarterly basis — the First Instance Division four times a year and the Appellate Division four times a year. This sparse schedule caused by budgetary issues has created a backlog of 260 cases.

=== East African Legislative Assembly ===
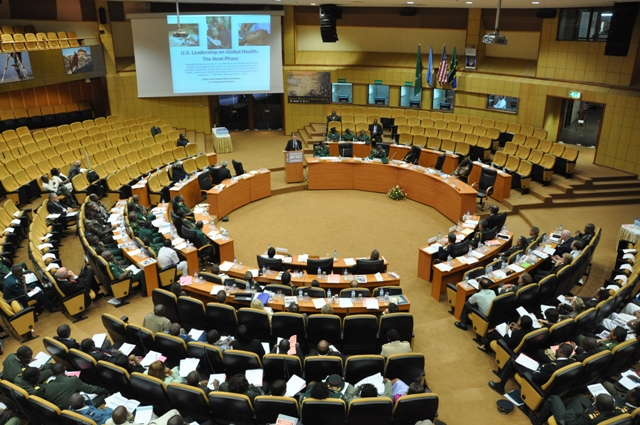
The 2010 East African Legislative Assembly hosting the International Military HIV/AIDS Conference

The East African Legislative Assembly (EALA) is the legislative arm of the community. The EALA has 27 members who are all elected by the National Assemblies or Parliaments of the member states of the community. The EALA has oversight functions on all matters that fall within the community's work and its functions include debating and approving the budget of the community, discussing all matters pertaining to the community and making recommendations to the council as it may deem necessary for the implementation of the treaty, liaising with National Assemblies or Parliaments on matters pertaining to the community and establishing committees for such purposes as it deems necessary. The Assemblypersons have a term of five years and a term limit of two. The EALA meets at least once a year and since being inaugurated in 2001, the EALA has had several sittings as a plenum in Arusha, Kampala, and Nairobi. Any member may introduce a bill and upon a simple majority vote, the bill proceeds to the Heads of State in which if any Head of State declines to assent within three months, the bill heads back to the EALA for editing.

The assembly has been credited with crucial bills, particularly those regarding regional and international trade, including EAC's stand on issues such as the World Trade Organization and transport on Lake Victoria.

As of August 2024, the Speaker of the Assembly is Dan Kidega from Uganda. He replaced former Speaker of the Assembly and Ugandan MP Margaret Zziwa after her impeachment.

The EALA is on an indefinite break since July 2025 due to lack of budget.

=== The Secretariat ===
Period	Secretary-General
2000–2001	(Kenya) Francis Muthaura
2001–2006	(Uganda) Amanya Mushega
2006–2011	(Tanzania) Juma Mwapachu
2011–2016	(Rwanda) Richard Sezibera
2016–2021	(Burundi) Libérat Mfumukeko
2021–2024	(Kenya) Peter Mathuki
2024–2026	(Kenya) Veronica Nduva
2026–present	(Tanzania) Stephen Mbundi

The Secretariat is the executive organ of the EAC. The highest office of the Secretariat is the Secretary General. The Secretary General is appointed by the summit upon nomination by the current rotational head of state and serves one five-year fixed term. The Secretariat also contains the offices of the Deputy Secretaries General appointed by the Summit and under the purview of the Secretary General. The Secretariat's principle function is the implementation of the decisions of the Summit and the Council with other functions including research on best methods to achieve the EAC treaty's goals, management of funds, and investigation of EAC affairs. Stephen Mbundi is the current Secretary General of the EAC.

=== EAC Institutions ===
There are eight current Heads of EAC Institutions. Vivienne Yeda Apopo of Zambia is the current acting Director-General of East African Economic Development and has had this position since 2009. Dr. Novat Twungubumwe of Burundi is the current acting Attorney General and Executive Secretary East African Health Research Commission. Dr. Sylvance Okeyo Okoth is the Executive Secretary of the East African Science and Technology Commission (EASTECO). Dr. Caroline Asiimwe of Uganda is the serving Executive Secretary of the East African Kiswahili Commission. Prof. Gaspard Banyankimbona of Uganda is the serving Executive Secretary of the Inter-University Council for East Africa. Eng. Richard Gatete of Rwanda is the serving executive director of the Civil Aviation Safety and Security Oversight Agency. Lilian K. Mukoronia of Kenya is the acting Registrar of the East African Community Competition Authority. Dr. Masinde K. Bwire is the serving Executive Secretary Lake Victoria Basin Commission.

== Issues ==
=== Support ===
An EAC political union committee conducted a study on the support for the planned political union in the then-five member states from 2007 to 2009. Except for Tanzania, these committees found that the majority of their populations were in favour of further integration. While the committee continued to study integration until 2012, enthusiasm for the idea waned.

EAC Helpfulness (2014-15 Survey)
Country	EAC "helps a lot"	EAC "helps some- what"	EAC "helps a little"	EAC does nothing	Don't know
Uganda	20%	21%	15%	7%	37%
Kenya	16%	28%	27%	8%	20%
Tanzania	16%	28%	13%	16%	28%

Surveying of Tanzania in 2012 by independent research group Afrobarometer revealed that 70% of Tanzanians approved of free movement of people, goods, and services. Meanwhile, 55% of Tanzanians approve the customs union and 54% approve of the proposed monetary union. On all three issues, share of people answering "Don't Know" has more than halved since 2008 indicating higher rates of civic engagement on EAC issues. Approval of a joint army went from 26% in 2008 to 38% in 2012, with the majority (53%) still disapproving. In Kenya, approval for the free movement of people, goods, and services was at 52% as of 2021. Support for the monetary union sat at 49%, with 44% disapproving. 65% of those with no lived poverty approved of the free movement policy while only 44% of those with high lived poverty supported it. Surveying in May 2015 in Uganda found that 69% support free movement across borders in the region. In Burundi, 64% supported free movement among the region. A combined 56% of Ugandans thought the EAC "helps a lot", "helps somewhat", or "helps a little" in their country. 71% of Kenyans thought the EAC helps in some capacity while 57% of Tanzanians thought the EAC helps in some capacity. (Note: Survey does not include option for "EAC harms")

Awareness of EAC Organs in Kenya is low; 43% had heard nothing of the EALA, with only 29% hearing "some" or "a great deal". 47% of Kenyans said that their EALA representatives should be elected directly instead of elected by the Kenyan Parliament.

Much of the support for East African integration comes from the national elites. Old enough to remember the former EAC, many are nostalgic for that period of East African politics and regret its eventual dissolution. However, 61% of the 18-25 demographic supported free movement in Kenya while only 43% of the 46-55 demographic supported it. This could be due to a growing sense of East African identity in the youth developing from modern communications. The group with highest support for free movement in Kenya was those with post-secondary education, with 73% supporting.

=== Corruption ===
In March of 2024, an impeachment campaign was started in the EALA for the impeachment of Secretary General Peter Mathuki due to six million dollars in missing funds from the EAC Secretariat's Peace Fund. The allegations came from four whistleblowers close to his office who complained to one EALA MP. EALA Finance Subcommittee Chairperson Denis Namara broached the allegations at a EALA Plenary Session on 5 March 2024, following a speech from Kenyan President William Ruto, beginning the process of impeachment. However, on 8 March 2024, Dr. Mathuki was recalled by Ruto, sidestepping the impeachment which would have reflected negatively on Kenya. He was the first EAC Secretary-General to be recalled. Ruto appointed Dr. Mathuki to Ambassador of Kenya to Russia, which the Kenyan National Assembly confirmed soon thereafter. On May 14 2024, the EALA announced that it would investigate Dr. Mathuki for corruption and abuse of office, with charges including fabricated travel expenses and favoritism in hiring of staff and consultants. Following the publicisation of his corruption, it has been suggested that member states have been hesitant to continue remitting funds following the misallocation. Member states have reportedly refused to remit funds until a full audit is conducted.

=== Budget deficit ===
The EAC is critically underfunded due to defaulting member states. Kenya, Tanzania and Somalia are the only member states to not have any standing debt. Uganda has paid 99% of its remittance. As of 25 November 2024, only US$13.3 million of the $89.5 million budget for financial year 2024/2025 had been remitted. Chairperson of the EALA Budget Committee Ayason Mukulia stated that the failure in remission may stem from hesitancy following the misallocation of US$6 million in funds from the Secretariat by former Secretary General Peter Mathuki. Member states had reportedly refused to remit funds until a full audit is conducted.

The budget deficits led to a slowdown in community operations. The EACJ had a backlog of 260 cases due to its sporadic meeting schedule. Because of the lack of funds, the EACJ only meets quarterly — the First Instance Division meets four times a year and the Appellate Division too four times a year. There are 150 staff vacancies and hiring has been frozen since 2024. 30 more senior officers are set to leave in July after their contracts expire. Since July 2025, the EALA has been on an indefinite break due to lack of budget. As of September 2025, they have fewer than ten employees.

The equal-share model was adopted when the EAC comprised only Kenya, Tanzania, and Uganda, however beginning with the accession of Rwanda and Burundi and accelerated by the accession of South Sudan and the DRC, the equal-contribution model became no longer be sustainable. EALA Chairperson of the Budget Committee Ken Mukulia suggested amendments to the EAC legal instruments to distribute power according to size of contribution should accompany the new financing model. At the 23rd Ordinary summit in 2023, they agreed on a new financing model in which 65% of the budget is contributed to equally, while the remaining 35% is contributed to on the basis of each member states' respective average nominal GDP in the past five years as assessed by the World Bank. They have since changed these ratios to 50% and 50%. As of September 2026, the EAC has a total budget deficit of US$80 million.

Auctioning stranded goods in the ports of Dar es Salaam and Mombasa slated for the three major defaulters has been suggested as a method of paying off their debt. Both Mukulia and Rwandan President Paul Kagame proposed sanctioning defaulting member states.

=== DRC-EAC tensions ===
==== The M23 offensive ====
Military situation as of 16 May 2025 Controlled by March 23 Movement and allied militias Controlled by Land Forces of the Democratic Republic of the Congo and allied militias Presence of Ugandan army forces Presence of Burundi army forces Presence of Wazalendo militias (DRC-aligned) Resources: Gold mines Tantalum, tungsten or tin mines

The March 23 Movement, a Congolese rebel military group composed mostly of ethnic Tutsi, waged a rebellion in the northeastern DRC from 2012 to 2013. M23 was formed by deserters of the DRC Armed Forces (FARDC) who had previously been members of the CNDP rebel group and been dissatisfied with the conditions of their service. Both the CNDP as well as the March 23 Movement's first rebellion were supported by Rwanda and Uganda. A United Nations report found that Rwanda created and commanded the M23 rebel group. Rwanda ceased its support because of international pressure and the military defeat by the DRC and the UN in 2013. After agreeing to a peace deal, M23 was largely dismantled, its fighters disarmed and moved into refugee camps in Uganda. In 2017, an M23 splinter group fled Uganda to Kivu to resume their insurgency, however, the operation achieved little as the M23 no longer enjoyed significant international support. Uganda and the DRC had greatly improved relations, cooperating against a common enemy in the Allied Democratic Forces during Operation Shujaa. In early 2022, a growing number of M23 combatants began leaving their camps and move back to the DR Congo; the rebel movement launched more attacks in February 2022, but these were repelled. The M23 leadership argued that parts of their movement had resumed the insurgency because the conditions of the 2013 peace deal were not being honored by the DRC government. The rebels also argued that they were attempting to defend Kivu's Tutsi minority from attacks by Hutu militants such as the Democratic Forces for the Liberation of Rwanda (FDLR). This follows a long trend of Hutu-Tutsi violence, exemplified by the Burundi genocide of 1993 and the Rwandan genocide of 1994, the latter having been stopped by current President of Rwanda Paul Kagame, an ethnic Tutsi who has remained in power over the Hutu-majority country since the end of the genocide.

On 6 April 2022, the FARDC rejected any negotiations with the M23 forces based in the DR Congo, and started a counter-attack. However, as the FARDC was increasingly losing ground to the insurgents, the DRC government and a number of rebel groups held peace talks in Nairobi in late April, only for the offensive to resume in May. In late May, insurgents temporarily seized Rumangabo before it was retaken by the FARDC. According to independent researchers, the insurgents were supported by Rwandan soldiers during the battle for Rumangabo. Following months of attempts, on 13 June 2022, M23 captured the town of Bunagana. FARDC spokesman Sylvain Ekenge declared that the fall of Bunagana constituted "no less than an invasion" by Rwanda. Two senior Congolese security sources and members of the Congolese parliament also accused Uganda of supporting the rebel offensive. The Congolese MPs claimed that the retreat of the Uganda People's Defense Force before the rebel attack had facilitated the takeover of Bunagana. The DRC ended military cooperation with Uganda, leading to Uganda subsequently halting Operation Shujaa. Kenyan President Uhuru Kenyatta responded to the fall of Bunagana and the growing regional tensions by calling for the EAC to immediately organize a new peacekeeping mission called the East African Community Regional Force to restore security in the eastern DR Congo. An EAC meeting was organized in Nairobi to discuss the diplomatic tensions between the DRC, Rwanda, and Uganda, as well as the deployment of a new peacekeeping force. The DRC declared that it would welcome an EAC peacekeeping mission but only under the condition of Rwanda's exclusion from the operation. The EAC subsequently called on M23 to retreat from Bunagana as precondition for a ceasefire, but the insurgents rejected the order. Anti-Rwandan protests broke out on 31 October in Goma, demanding that the DRC leave the EAC and that Russia intervene in the conflict. On 2 November, Kenya announced that it would send 900 soldiers to fight against the M23. The Ugandan military then joined the Kenyan troops in fighting the M23. On 28 December 2022, South Sudan sent a contingency of 750 troops to join the EACRF, to be stationed in Goma. Over the next few months, the EACRF made some ground, with various towns being ceded to the EACRF. On 3 April, Ugandan EACRF soldiers entered Bunagana. However, instead of taking the city, the EACRF coexisted with the rebel forces. A similar arrangement was also observed at Rumangabo, where Kenyans and M23 inhabited the same base, and along the Sake-Kilolirwe-Kitshanga-Mwesso axis, where Burundian and rebel forces operated next to each other.

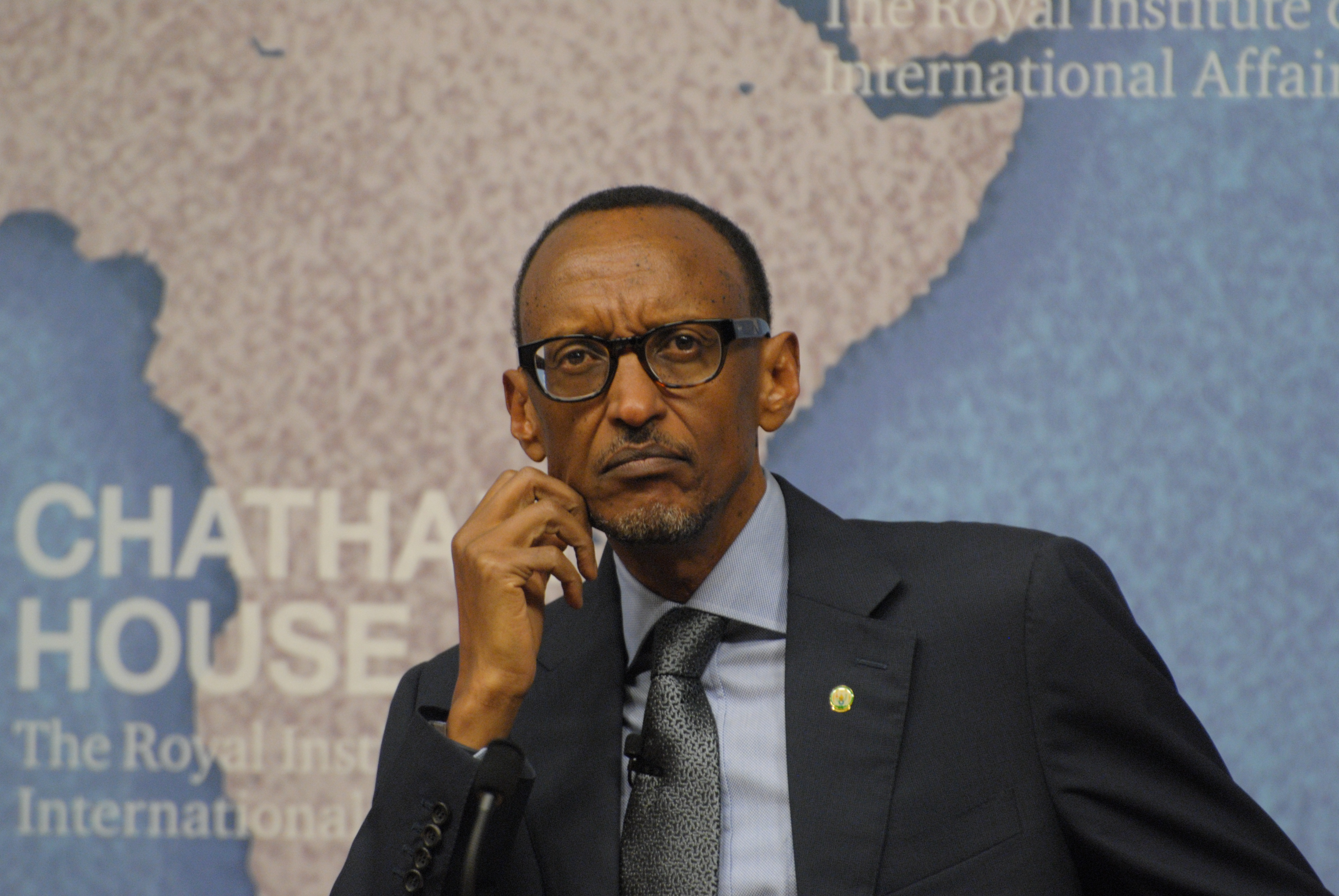
Rwandan President Paul Kagame, commander-in-chief of the Rwanda Defence Force found to fighting alongside the M23 rebel group

In October 2023, the DRC ordered the EAC force in the country to leave by 8 December, due to a "lack of satisfactory results on the ground". On 19 December 2023, the last of the EACRF forces had withdrawn from the Eastern DRC. To replace the EACRF, SADC forces on 15 December 2023 were deployed to the region to "restore peace and security in the eastern DRC". Kenyan President William Ruto and Angolan President João Lourenço met on 8 January 2025 to discuss consolidating EAC and SADC efforts in peacemaking in the conflict area.

In January 2025, Goma was again the target of a renewed offensive by the Rwandan-backed M23 rebels. The heads of state of both Rwanda and the DRC agreed to attend a peace summit hosted by Kenya at the invitation of President William Ruto. The emergency meeting, involving all East African Community member states, was held on 29 January 2025 with Rwanda's Kagame but not DRC's Tshisekedi, who cancelled his participation. The organisation called for an immediate ceasefire and for Congo to negotiate with the M23.

==== Rumours of DRC exit ====
At the 24th Ordinary Summit held in November 2024, Congolese President Felix Tshisekedi, expected to take over as Summit Chairperson, neither attended nor sent a representative, with Kenyan President William Ruto elected to the position instead. This follows a series of absences by Tshisekedi, including the 23rd Extraordinary Summit, held on 7 June 2024 to appoint Veronica Mueni Nduva as Secretary General. Insiders at the Secretariat have stated that the DRC rarely takes part in meetings and as of 22 June 2024, the DRC has yet to align its legal instruments with the EAC as per the treaty. The DRC has implemented free movement of people however otherwise has not integrated to the extent the other member states have. The DRC is required to remit money yearly to the EAC as part of its membership; however, despite accessing in 2019, it had failed to remit a cent until 2024 when it remitted US$1 million to the EAC. The DRC still owes a total of US$20.7 million.

Analysts have suggested that the DRC's continued absence is a boycott in response to Kenyan President William Ruto's stance on the M23 conflict. At a summit discussion on if the M23 were Rwandan or Congolese. Ruto said "the DRC told us: 'They are Congolese'. End of the debate. If they are Congolese, how does this become a Rwandan problem? How does this become a Kagame problem?".

Former Foreign Minister of the DRC Christophe Lutundula said the DRC strategy was "to join the Eastern bloc, of course for regional integration and economic reasons, but also to better plead the Congo's security cause, where Rwanda is making its voice heard", suggesting that DRC accession to the EAC was in large part due to counteracting Rwanda's influence in the bloc. Congolese legislators in the EALA said the DRC was not considering quitting the EAC, but that the decision was up to President Tshisekedi.

MP Bertran Ewanga, head of the DRC chapter of the EALA, suggested that additional tension arose from a statement by Kenyan President William Ruto during a state dinner with U.S. President Joe Biden, although the specific statement that caused the tension is unknown. DRC Spokesman Patrick Muyaya said the peace in Kivu was taking too long to be realised and that "some Congolese are now questioning why we even asked to join the EAC". He also said the DRC is "happier in the SADC than in the EAC", which reflected the EACRF's replacement at request of Tshisekedi with SADC forces. He also cited the war as a direct reason for the limited efforts in integration as Rwanda and Kenya are seen as supporters of the M23 rebellion.

Tshisekedi recalled the ambassador of the DRC to Kenya in December 2023 and has yet to accredit the new Kenyan ambassador to the DRC due to disagreements surrounding the Congo River Alliance, a group including DRC politicians and various secessionist militias including the M23. Tshisekedi demanded that Kenya hand over any persons engaging in "subversive activities", to which Kenyan foreign minister Musalia Mudavadi said "Kenya strongly disassociates itself from any utterances or activities likely to injure the peace and security of the friendly nation of DRC and has commenced an investigation". Ultimately, Kenya found the statements to fall under constitutionally protected speech.

The DRC's entry into the EAC was facilitated by Kenyan President Uhuru Kenyatta, Ruto's predecessor and a friend to Tshisekedi. Ruto is seen as reversing the positions that allowed the DRC to join in the first place. DRC Opposition leader Martin Fayulu has called the DRC's membership in the EAC a "big mistake". The EAC treaty has no provisions for the forcible exit of a member state, with only sanctions having been outlined. During the 7 June 2024 Summit, Paul Kagame called for a meeting of the Council of Ministers to discuss peace in the region.

Despite conflicts, Secretary General Veronica Nduva said in November 2024 that the DRC is finalising a review of its policy and legal framework to align with EAC protocols, including waiving visa requirements for citizens of all EAC partner States.

=== Somali integration ===
As of July 2024, Somalia is active in an ongoing civil war. The main insurgent group is the Al-Qaeda-linked, Sunni Islamist military Al-Shabaab. Although based in Somalia, its reach extends all the way to Kampala, Uganda, where it killed 76 people in a 2010 Kampala bombings. As a result of the ongoing civil war, Somalia topped the annual Fragile States Index for six years from 2008 up to and including 2013. Troops from Kenya, Ethiopia, Uganda, Burundi and Djibouti have fought Al-Shabaab since 2007, first as the African Union Mission to Somalia then as African Union Transition Mission in Somalia (ATMIS). However, as of July 2024, 5,000 soldiers have left Somalia as ATMIS prepares to leave Somalia by December 2024. Recently, Al-Shabaab have allied with the Ugandan rebel group, the Allied Democratic Forces, trading arms and training for illegally-mined minerals from the Eastern DRC. Al-Shabaab has also created a sect of foreign fighters called the Muhajirin, including primarily Kenyan, Ethiopian and Tanzanian nationals, but also some Congoleses, Burundians, Rwandans and Ugandans. In 2024, Al-Shabaab recaptured much of the land captured by the retreating ATMIS.

Most of Somalia operates independently from its federal government. Somaliland, an internationally unrecognized state within the borders of Somalia, released a statement following Somalia’s accession into the EAC stating that the “decision is a clear violation of Somaliland's sovereignty and territorial integrity,” and called for the EAC, the African Union, and the United Nations to recognize their statehood. In addition, Puntland has temporarily withdrawn until the constitutional amendments concentrating power under president Hassan Sheikh Mohamud are approved in a nationwide referendum. These conflicts have caused the federal government to control only around ten percent of its internationally-recognized territory as of May 2024.

Since 2025 integration efforts were focused on its laws, institutions, and economic regulations to match regional standards, rather than reaching full integration. Somalia has been implementing EAC trade, customs and markets rules while looking to enter local markets, investments and infrastructure networks. The slow progress is accounted to limited administrative capacity, security issues and the need for customs and regularity reforms.

=== Differences in modes of governance ===
Despite efforts at integration and standardizing governance, there remains significant political differences between the states. Ugandan President Yoweri Museveni's success in obtaining his third-term amendment raised doubts in the other countries. The single-party dominance in the Tanzanian and Ugandan parliaments is unattractive to Kenyans, while Kenya's ethnic-politics remains absent in Tanzania. Rwanda has a distinctive political culture with a political elite committed to building a developmental state.

These differences in modes of governance was exemplified when South Sudanese president Salva Kiir was appointed chairperson of the EAC in November 2023. This decision was criticized by some regional observers including Duop Chak Wuol, an influential South Sudanese analyst, who criticized the appointment of Kiir, seeing it as evidence of the EAC's failure to uphold its moral obligations and accused the bloc of ignoring what he described as Salva Kiir's tyranny. Many have argued that support for East African integration from local politicians grants often-corrupt politicians the ability to present themselves as statesmen and representatives of a greater regional interest. Furthermore, EAC institutions bring significant new powers to dispose and depose to those who serve in them.

== Economics ==
=== Importance of the customs union ===
The key aspects of the customs union include:

1. a Common External Tariff (CET) on imports from third countries;
2. duty-free trade between the member states; and
3. common customs procedures.

Since July 2022, the CET has four main duty rates:

1. 35% duty on finished products
2. 25% duty on intermediate products available in the EAC region
3. 10% duty on intermediate products not available in the EAC region
4. 0% duty on raw materials and capital goods

However rates still vary on some individual products, such as an 100% duty on sugar. There are also some additional "sensitive items" which exceed the 35% duty rate including dairy products, maize, rice, and woven fabrics. Kenya was granted a temporary exception to the CET to import grain at a lower tariff to meet local demand and increase food security. The rules regulating what counts as a domestic vs foreign product is regulated by the Rules of Origin (RoO). The RoO is expected to be updated every five years however has not been updated since 2015. The customs union is not yet exercised in the full extent of the promise. For instance, Kenya still holds excise duties on many products, raising excise duty rates in 2023. And although Kenya recently loosened certain duties, they still haven't enacted full free movement of goods. This also means that countries outside of the EAC must still navigate local tax and duties opposed to a singular tax policy, simplifying the process of investing in EAC member states. For EAC internal trade in the third quarter of 2023, Tanzania was the biggest exporter with US$798.12 million, Uganda was the biggest importer with US$649.3 million, and Rwanda had the highest internal EAC in trade deficit of US$375.23 million. Intra-regional trade currently stands at 15% of EAC trade according to Summit Chairman Salva Kiir, which was deemed unsatisfactory.

=== Common market ===
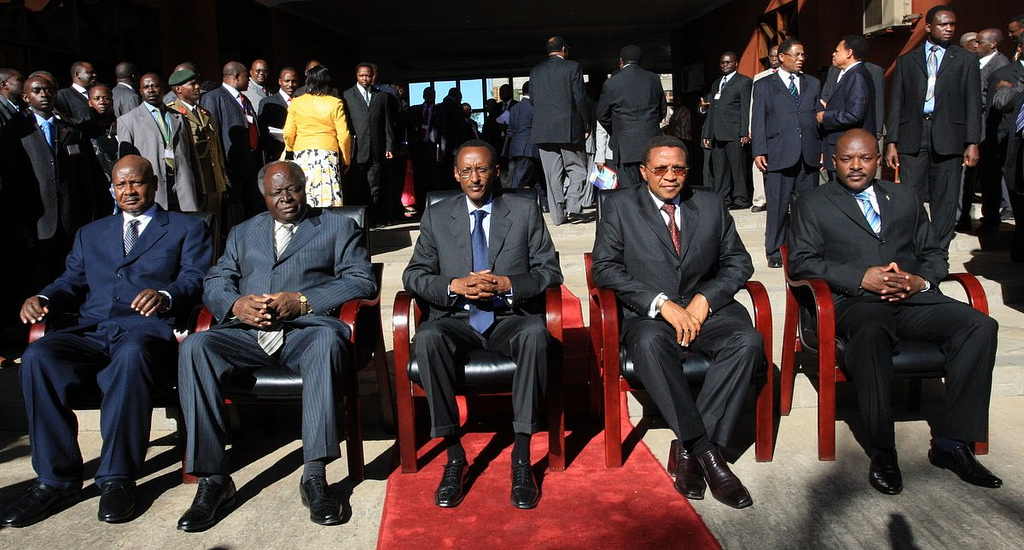
EAC heads in 2009. From left to right: Yoweri Museveni (Uganda), Mwai Kibaki (Kenya), Paul Kagame (Rwanda), Jakaya Kikwete (Tanzania), Pierre Nkurunziza (Burundi).

On 1 July 2010, the EAC launched the Common Market Protocol, an expansion of the bloc's existing customs union that entered into effect in 2005. Corruption has led to some integration initiatives being underfunded. The full adoption of the common market has been undermined by continued protectionism between member states, with decisions driven by political pressures on national leaders slowing down the implementation of commitments to integration, even within founding members. Bilateral political tensions have led to border controls in some periods, further undermining the shared labour market. In 2024, Rwanda closed its borders with Burundi and the DRC, after a previous three-year closure of its border with Uganda in 2019. In January 2023, Burundi closed its border with Rwanda after President Evariste Ndayishimiye accused Rwanda of hosting and training the RED-Tabara rebel group.

Despite border closings, an immense amount of inter-EAC migration is still occurring; From July to December 2023, around 376,000 citizens emigrated to Rwanda from other EAC member states, including around 76,500 Burundians. In turn, Burundi received around 251,500 citizens from other EAC member states, including 110,500 Rwandans. South Sudan received 69,584 citizens, half of which were from Uganda.

In 2010, the introduction of "third generation" ID cards was planned. These cards identify the holder as a dual citizen of their home country and of "East Africa". Third generation cards are already in use in Rwanda with Kenya set to introduce them in July 2010 and the other countries following afterwards. An East African passport was launched on 1 April 1999 in the original three countries of Kenya, Tanzania and Uganda. The 17th Ordinary Summit held on 2 March 2016 launched the East African electronic passport. Tanzania started issuing the EA e-passport on 31 January 2018; Kenya and Burundi on 28 May 2018; Uganda on 18 December 2018 and Rwanda on 28 June 2019. South Sudan, the DRC and Somalia are still establishing the legal framework to start issuing the document. Kenya, Uganda and Rwanda, allow citizens to travel within their territories using a national ID as a travel document. Kenya in December 2024 introduced the Class R work permit allowing any EAC national to work in Kenya free of charge. Tanzania, DRC, Somalia, Burundi, and South Sudan still charge EAC nationals for work permits. Mutual recognition and accreditation of higher education institutions is also being worked towards as is the harmonisation of social security benefits across the EAC.

=== Emerging business trends ===
Business leaders are far more positive than economists about the benefits of EAC integration, its customs union as a step in the process, as well as the wider integration under COMESA. The larger economic players perceive long-term benefits in a progressively expanding regional market. Patterns of regional development are already emerging, including:

- Kenyan firms have successfully aligned to the lower protection afforded by the EAC CET and fears that firms would not adjust to a 25% maximum CET, or would relocate to Tanzania or Uganda have not been realised.
- An intraregional division of labour is developing, which results in basic import-processing relocating to the coast to supply the hinterland. The final stages of import-processing (especially those bulky finished goods that involve high transportation costs) and natural-resource based activities are moving up-country and up-region, either within value chains of large companies or different segments located by firms in different countries.
- Trade in goods and services has already increased as service provision to Kenyans and Tanzanians is already important for Uganda (in education and in health). Kenya exports financial services, for example via the Kenya Commercial Bank and purchase and upgrading of local operators in Tanzania, Uganda and Sudan. Uganda hopes integration will help support its tourism potential through integration with established regional circuits.
- There are signs of a business culture oriented to making profits through economies of scale and not on protectionism.
- Kenya historically has been the leader in intraregional trade. For the first time in 2024, Tanzania overtook Kenya's position, leading regional trade.

Due to the DRC's accession into the EAC, Congolese in Kisangani and Goma are now receiving their goods through ports in Mombasa and Dar es Salaam. The success of this new trade route has caused the DRC and South Sudan to integrate revenue systems to streamline cargo documentation, hastening the rate at which goods are cleared through the Port of Mombassa. The eastern region of the DRC currently has plentiful mining operations, in particular the mining of Cobalt. The mining sector of the EAC contributes around 2.3% of the GDP, with gold being the second highest exported product following petroleum in the fourth quarter of 2023. In the Southeastern DRC lays the copperbelt, known for its copper mining. The copper is currently majority exported via road with the exception of the Lobito Atlantic Railway, which stretches from the Lobito, Angola to Kolwezi. However, the Lobito Corridor project, with $250 million in U.S. financial investment, would construct around 550 km (350 miles) of railway in Zambia along the Zambia-DRC border, with feeder roads connecting DRC copper mines to the new railway.

=== Trade negotiations ===
On 16 July 2008, the United States and the EAC signed a Trade and Investment Framework Agreement, strengthening United States-EAC trade. The U.S. exported $1.1 billion and imported $1.3 billion from the EAC in 2022. This shifted the net goods traded from a total trade deficit of $211 million in 2021 to a trade surplus of $135 million in 2022. In Q4 2024, the EAC exported US$6.3 Billion.

Intra-regional trade among EAC member states accounts for only 15–20% of their total trade, with the bulk of trade occurring with external partners. Out of trade partners, the top five were China, the United Arab Emirates, India, South Africa, and Malaysia. The top importer of EAC goods was the UAE and the top source of imported goods was China. Trade with COMESA accounted for 11.5% of total EAC Trade while trade with SADC accounted for 12.9. On 2 December 2024, Germany and the EAC signed a development cooperation agreement committing 64€ million from Germany to be invested in the EAC. Out of that, 23€ million goes towards pandemic preparedness and combatting disease and 5€ million goes towards environmental conservation.

=== Poverty reduction ===
EAC that have economies have large informal sectors, unintegrated with the formal economy and large business. The concerns of large-scale manufacturing and agro-processing concerns are not broadly shared by the bulk of available labour. Research suggest the promised investments on the conditions of life of the region's overwhelmingly rural poor will be slight, with the significant exception of agro-industrial firms with out-grower schemes or that otherwise contribute to the co-ordination of smallholder production and trade.

It is informal trade across borders that is most often important to rural livelihoods and a customs union is unlikely to significantly impact the barriers that this faces and taxes are still being fixed separately by countries. However, the introduction of one-stop border posts being introduced and the reduction in tariff barriers are coming down progressively.

The establishment of a common market will create both winners (numerous food producers and consumers on both sides of all borders) and losers (smugglers and the customs, police and local government officers who currently benefit from bribery at and around the borders) in the border areas. More substantial impact could be attained by a new generation of investments in world-market production based on the region's comparative advantages in natural resources (especially mining and agriculture) and the new tariff structure creates marginally better conditions for world-market exporters, by cheapening inputs and by reducing upward pressures on the exchange rate.

== Plans ==
The new treaty was proposed with plans drawn up in 2004 to introduce a monetary union with a common currency some time between 2012 and 2015. There were also plans for a political union, the East African Federation, with a common President (initially on a rotation basis) and a common parliament by 2010. However, some experts, like those based in the public think tank Kenya Institute for Public Policy Research and Analysis (KIPPRA), noted that the plans were too ambitious to be met by 2010 because a number of political, social and economic challenges are yet to be addressed. The proposal was the subject of National Consultative discussions, and a final decision was to be taken by the EAC Heads of State in mid-2007. In 2013, a protocol was signed outlining their plans for launching a monetary union within 10 years. There are concerns that rapid integration would enflame popular reactionary politics against the project. However it's also been argued that, with high costs that would be required at the beginning, fast-tracking the project would allow the benefits to be seen earlier.

Given the infrastructure problems that persist in the fledgling country since South Sudanese president Salva Kiir cut off oil commerce with Sudan, the state has decided to invest in constructing pipelines that circumvent Sudan's, which it had been using until that time. These new pipelines would extend through Ethiopia to the ports of Djibouti, as well as to the southeast to the coast of Kenya.

In September 2018, a committee was formed to begin the process of drafting a regional constitution.

In January 2023, the Secretary-General of the East African Community announced plans to issue a single currency within the next four years. The Council of Ministers of the organization must decide on the location of the East African Monetary Institute and the establishment of a roadmap for the issuance of the single currency. In 2025, the implementation was pushed back to 2031.

=== Coalition of the Willing ===
A "Coalition of the Willing", made up of Kenya, Rwanda, and Uganda, began a number of initiatives amongst themselves including joint railway and oil pipeline projects, a joint tourist visa, and a defence and security pact, to get around reluctance from other members. However, even within this grouping, progress on projects has been delayed. Bilateral friction between members, a lack of enthusiasm, and political instability have been the primary reasons behind the delaying and weakening of integration efforts.

=== Single tourist visa ===
It had been hoped that an East African Single Tourist Visa may have been ready for November 2006, if it was approved by the relevant sectoral authorities under the EAC's integration programme. Had it been approved, the visa would have been valid for all three current member states of the EAC (Kenya, Tanzania and Uganda). Under the proposal for the visa, any new EAC single visa could be issued by any member state's embassy. The visa proposal followed an appeal by the tourist boards of the partner states for a common visa to accelerate promotion of the region as a single tourist destination and the EAC Secretariat wanted it approved before November's World Travel Fair (or World Travel Market) in London. When approved by the EAC's council of ministers, tourists could apply for one country's entry visa which would then be applicable in all regional member states as a single entry requirement initiative.

A single East African Tourist Visa for the EAC countries of Kenya, Rwanda, and Uganda has been available since 2014.

== Demographics ==
2024 Population statistics of constituent states
Name	Population	% of Total Population	Annual Population Growth	TFR	HDI
DR Congo	115,403,027	33.0%	3.11%	6.0	0.481
Tanzania	67,462,121	19.3%	2.72%	4.5	0.532
Kenya	58,246,378	16.6%	2.06%	3.2	0.601
Uganda	49,283,041	14.1%	3.18%	4.2	0.550
Somalia	19,655,000	5.6%	2.55%	6.0	0.380
Rwanda	13,623,302	3.9%	1.62%	3.6	0.548
Burundi	13,590,102	3.9%	2.81%	4.8	0.420
South Sudan	12,703,714	3.6%	4.65%	4.1	0.381
East African Community	349,966,685	100%	2.83%	4.8	0.515

The population of the constituent parts of the EAC is composed of 65% under 30-year-olds. This youth bulge is anticipated to grow to 75% of the population under the age of 25 in this region by 2030.

The East African Community's current urban population stands at about 20%.

=== Languages ===
English is the official language of the EAC. Kiswahili was designated for development as the lingua franca of the community in 2000 with French added as a lingua franca in 2021. Given this, there is an ongoing effort to elevate French to an official language, with France and the EAC signing an agreement in March 2020 to elevate French as an official language of the EAC alongside English. France is financing around €42,500 toward the project, which has seen delays due to the Covid-19 pandemic. Numerous local languages are also spoken: for example, there are 56 local languages spoken in Uganda, 125 in Tanzania, 72 in South Sudan and 67 local languages in Kenya. Kinyarwanda is spoken in Rwanda and Uganda. There are over 200 local languages spoken in the DRC. Lingala is widely spoken in the western Democratic Republic of Congo, with about 15 million speakers and Kiswahili with 23 million speakers across the country.

== Comparison with other regional blocs ==
African Economic Community
Pillar regional blocs (REC)	Area (km²)	Population	GDP (PPP) ($US)		Member states
Pillar regional blocs (REC)	Area (km²)	Population	(millions)	(per capita)	Member states
EAC	5,449,717	349,966,685	737,420	2,149	8
ECOWAS/CEDEAO	5,112,903	349,154,000	1,322,452	3,788	15
IGAD	5,233,604	294,197,387	225,049	1,197	7
AMU/UMA ^{4}	6,046,441	106,919,526	1,299,173	12,628	5
ECCAS/CEEAC	6,667,421	218,261,591	175,928	1,451	11
SADC	9,882,959	394,845,175	737,392	3,152	15
COMESA	12,873,957	406,102,471	735,599	1,811	20
CEN-SAD ^{4}	14,680,111				29
Total AEC	29,910,442	853,520,010	2,053,706	2,406	54
Other regional blocs	Area (km²)	Population	GDP (PPP) ($US)		Member states
Other regional blocs	Area (km²)	Population	(millions)	(per capita)	Member states
WAMZ ^{1}	1,602,991	264,456,910	1,551,516	5,867	6
SACU ^{1}	2,693,418	51,055,878	541,433	10,605	5
CEMAC ^{2}	3,020,142	34,970,529	85,136	2,435	6
UEMOA ^{1}	3,505,375	80,865,222	101,640	1,257	8
UMA ^{2} ^{4}	5,782,140	84,185,073	491,276	5,836	5
GAFTA ^{3} ^{4}	5,876,960	1,662,596	6,355	3,822	5
AES	2,780,159	71,374,000	179,347		3
During 2004. Sources: The World Factbook 2005, IMF WEO Database. Smallest value among the blocs compared. Largest value among the blocs compared.^{1}: Economic bloc inside a pillar REC.^{2}: Proposed for pillar REC, but objecting participation.^{3}: Non-African members of GAFTA are excluded from figures.^{4}: The area 446,550 km^{2} used for Morocco excludes all disputed territories, while 710,850 km^{2} would include the Moroccan-claimed and partially-controlled parts of Western Sahara (claimed as the Sahrawi Arab Democratic Republic by the Polisario Front). Morocco also claims Ceuta and Melilla, making up about 22.8 km^{2} (8.8 sq mi) more claimed territory.

== See also ==
- List of East African Community sub regions by Human Development Index
- African Union Passport
- 17th EAC Extra Ordinary summit
- CASSOA
- EAC Railway Masterplan
- East African Federation
- East African Community Treaty
- East African School of Taxation
- Economy of Africa
- List of Trade blocs
- International Conference on the Great Lakes Region
- Intergovernmental Authority on Development (IGAD)
- Southern African Development Community (SADC)
- Common Market for Eastern and Southern Africa (COMESA)
- Economic Community of Central African States (ECCAS)
- Economic Community of West African States (ECOWAS)
- Economic Community of the Great Lakes Countries (ECGLC)
- Rules of Origin
- Market access
- Free-trade area
- Tariffs
