= Asiimwe =

Apio is a surname. Notable people with the surname include:

- Caroline Asiimwe, Ugandan veterinary and environment conservation leader and researcher
- Florence Akiiki Asiimwe (born 1980), Ugandan politician, author, and lecturer
- Jacqueline Asiimwe (born 1970), Ugandan human rights lawyer and philanthropy advisor
- Molly Musiime Asiimwe, Ugandan politician and woman member of parliament
- Nathan Asiimwe (born 2004), Ugandan professional footballer
