= East African Federation =

Proposed African country

East African Federation Shirikisho la Afrika Mashariki (Swahili)
- Motto: "One People, One Destiny"
- Anthem: "Wimbo wa Jumuiya Afrika Mashariki"
- An orthographic projection of the world, highlighting the proposed East African Federation's territory (green)
- Proposed Capital: Arusha
- Largest city: Kinshasa
- Official languages: English, French, Swahili
- Lingua franca: Swahili
- Demonym: East African
- Type: Proposed federation
- States: 8 states: Burundi; DR Congo; Kenya; Rwanda; Somalia; South Sudan; Tanzania; Uganda
- Legislature: EALA

Establishment
  - East African Community: 7 July 2000

Area
  - Total: 5,449,717 km^{2} (2,104,147 sq mi) (Note: Includes Somaliland.) (7th)
  - Water (%): 3.83

Population
  - 2024 estimate: 343,328,958 (3rd)
  - Density: 63/km^{2} (163.2/sq mi)
- GDP (PPP): 2024 estimate
  - Total: ▲$1.027 trillion (34th)
  - Per capita: ▲$3,149
- GDP (nominal): 2024 estimate
  - Total: ▲$349.774 billion (42nd)
  - Per capita: ▲$1,067
- HDI (2022): 0.515 low
- Currency: East African shilling
- Time zone: UTC+2 / +3 (CAT / EAT)
- Website eac.int

The East African Federation (Swahili: Shirikisho la Afrika Mashariki) is a proposed federal sovereign state consisting of the eight member states of the East African Community in the African Great Lakes region—Burundi, the Democratic Republic of the Congo, Kenya, Rwanda, Somalia, South Sudan, Tanzania, and Uganda.

The idea of this federation has existed since the early 1960s but has not yet come to fruition for several reasons, though many steps have been taken to advance its establishment. Institutions and governing bodies already exist for the eventual union, with representatives from all of the related nations working towards the common goal. A voluntary confederation will be formed before a full political federation is established.

In September 2018, a committee was formed to begin the process of drafting a regional constitution, and a draft constitution for the confederation was set to be written by the end of 2021, with its implementation by 2023. However, the COVID-19 pandemic disrupted plans to draft and implement the constitution. The drafting resumed in May 2023, with a 20-day consultation with local stakeholders in Kenya.

== Features ==
At 5,449,717 km^{2} (2,104,147 sq mi), the East African Federation (EAF) would be the largest country in Africa and seventh-largest in the world, replacing India. It would span throughout the African continent from the Indian Ocean to the Atlantic Ocean. With a population of 343,328,958 as of 2024, it would also be the most populous nation in Africa and third in the world, surpassed only by China and India.

Swahili has been proposed as an official lingua franca. The proposed capital is Arusha, a city in Tanzania close to the Kenyan border, which is also the current headquarters of the East African Community. Currently, 22% of the population within these territories lives in urban areas.

According to a 2013 published report, the monetary union was slated for 2023. However, due to COVID-19 and the admission of new member states such as the DRC and Somalia, the date for the implementation of the monetary union has been pushed back to 2031. This would involve the creation of an East African Central Bank, called the East African Monetary Institute (EAMI). Currently, the location of EAMI has not yet been decided. The GDP (PPP) estimate would be US$1,027.067 billion, making it the 34th largest in the world and the third largest in Africa, following Nigeria and Egypt. The GDP (PPP) per capita estimate is approximately US$2,991, putting the East African Federation 172nd in the world.

As of 4 December 2024, William Ruto, the President of Kenya, serves as the East African Community's lead Summit Chairperson. Deng Alor Kuol, the Minister for East African Community Affairs in South Sudan, is the current Chairperson of the EAC Council of Ministers. Veronica Nduva is the current Secretary General of the EAC, having been appointed on 7 June 2024 following Kenya's recall of former EAC Secretary-General Peter Mathuki for alleged misallocation of $6 million in funds from the Peace Fund at the Secretariat.

== Timeline ==
=== Background ===
In the 1920s, Colonial Secretary Leo Amery sought to create a white-ruled East African Dominion composed of Kenya, Uganda and Tanganyika. The Permanent Mandates Commission, which oversaw Tanganyika (a mandated territory), opposed Amery's plan. The plan was opposed by nonwhite populations in Africa.

=== 1960s proposal ===
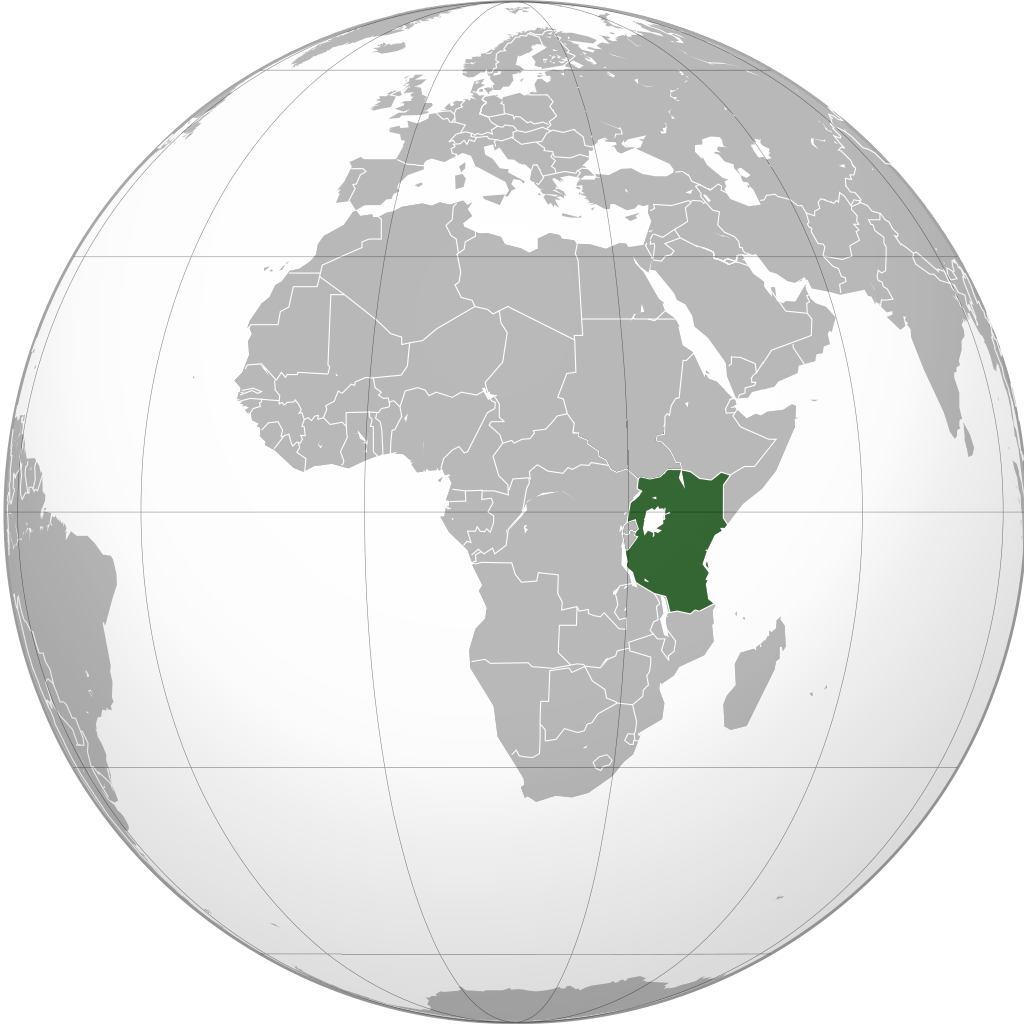
Proposed East African Federation in the 1960s

In the early 1960s, around the time Kenya, Tanganyika, Uganda and Zanzibar were gaining independence from the United Kingdom, the political leaders of the four nations had become interested in forming a federation. Julius Nyerere even offered in 1960 to delay the imminent independence of Tanganyika (due in 1961) in order for all of the East African territories to achieve independence together as a federation.

In June 1963, Kenyan Prime Minister Jomo Kenyatta met with the Tanganyika President Julius Nyerere and Ugandan Prime Minister Milton Obote in Nairobi. The trio discussed the possibility of merging their three nations (plus Zanzibar) into a single East African Federation, declaring that this would be accomplished by the end of the year. Subsequently, discussions on the planning for such a union were initiated.

Privately, Kenyatta was more reluctant regarding the arrangement and as 1964 came around, the federation had not come to pass. In May 1964, Kenyatta rejected a back-benchers resolution calling for speedier federation. He publicly stated that talk of a federation had always been a ruse to hasten the pace of Kenyan independence from the United Kingdom, but Nyerere denied the truth of this statement. Around the same time, Obote came out against an East African Federation, instead supporting pan-African unity, partly because of domestic political pressures with the semi-autonomous kingdom of Buganda's opposition to being in an East African federation as part of Uganda but rather as a unit in its own right. By late 1964, the prospects for a wider East African federation had died, although Tanganyika and Zanzibar did form a union in April 1964, eventually becoming Tanzania.

A variety of reasons have been put forth for the federation's failure. American political scientist Joseph Nye argued a primary reason was the Ugandan government's concerns about the possible subordinate position Uganda might have within the federation, as well as their "ideological objections inspired by Kwame Nkrumah's vision of East African federation as a neo-colonial, balkanising plot and an obstacle to continental unity." Other reasons have included Bugandan concerns over the loss of autonomy in the federation, the uneven distribution of benefits from economic integration, a lack of clarity on the function or form of federation and the absence of popular engagement with the scheme's process.

=== 2010s–2020s proposal ===
Proposed East African Federation in the 2010s

In the early 2010s, a federation of the current East African Community into a single state began to be discussed, with early estimates of the founding of the federation in 2013. In 2010, the EAC launched its own common market within the region, with the goal of a common currency by 2013 and full political federation in 2015.

South Sudan was approved for membership of the EAC in March 2016, and acceded in September 2016. South Sudan acceded as the South Sudanese Civil War occurred.

On 14 October 2013, the leaders of Uganda, Kenya, Rwanda and Burundi began a meeting in Kampala intending to draft a constitution for the East African Federation, but by December 2014, efforts for a full political federation had been pushed back to 2016 or later.

In February 2016, Ugandan President Yoweri Museveni described the union as "the number one target that we should aim at". In November 2016, the EAC Council of Ministers agreed to create an East African Confederation before the East African Federation is eventually created.

In September 2018, a committee of regional constitutional experts and drafters was formed to begin the process of drafting a regional constitution. The committee, led by retired Ugandan Chief Justice Benjamin Odoki and deputized by former Kenyan Attorney General Amos Wako, plans on holding consultations in every member state to lead with local stakeholders of the county governments, private sector, civil society, political leaders, clergy, and academia. This was launched with a five-day consultation meeting in Burundi from 14 to 18 January 2020, where it announced that a confederation constitution would be drafted by the end of 2021, with establishment by 2023. This was delayed by the accession of the DRC and the COVID-19 Pandemic. In April 2021, consultations were held in Uganda.

In April 2020, Yoweri Museveni restated his desire for the culmination of the East African Federation in an address to the nation, reinforcing his stance that the East African Federation could provide political and economic benefits for the region.

On 8 April 2022, the DRC officially acceded into the EAC and on 11 July 2022, the DRC officially became a member. Since its accession, the DRC has failed to remit any money, owing US$14.7 million, and has yet to align its legal instruments with the EAC as per the treaty. Additionally, EAC insiders have stated that the DRC rarely takes part in meetings. DRC Foreign Minister Christophe Lutundula stated the DRC joined the EAC "for regional integration and economic reasons, but also to better plead the Congo's security cause, where Rwanda is making its voice heard", referencing the March 23 Movement, a successionist militia operating in the Eastern DRC which has been found by multiple United Nations reports to have been militarily supported by both Uganda and Rwanda. The DRC recalled its ambassador to Kenya in December 2023 due to Kenyan President William Ruto denial of Rwandan involvement in the M23 offensive.

On 9 May 2023, the drafting process resumed with a 20-day consultation with local stakeholders in Kenya. Salva Kiir disclosed on 7 June 2024 that consultations would be held in South Sudan in July 2024 and urged expediting the founding of the confederation. However, according to a 30 November 2024 press release, this consultation has been delayed. Rwanda and Tanzania have set dates for constitutional consultations.

Somalia applied for membership in the EAC in March 2012, and acceded in December 2023. Somalia ratified the agreement on 4 March 2024, thus becoming the eighth member of the EAC. As of 7 June 2024, Somalia is preparing to integrate into both the Customs Union and Common Market. At a summit of the East African Community held in the Somali capital Mogadishu in October 2025, Hassan Sheikh Mohamud, President of Somalia, declared that Swahili will be incorporated at all levels of the country's school system. Aiming for further integration into the EAC further stated that "we want to see Swahili become a language of communication, trade and learning - even replacing English during our next conference".

Kenyan President Uhuru Kenyatta proposed expanding the EAC to include Ethiopia in 2022. Speaking at the opening of the One Stop Border post in Moyale in 2020, Ethiopian Prime Minister Abiy Ahmed affirmed his commitment to regional integration saying that the east African people are one people and economic integration is a key goal for the region to achieve so as to unlock its potential. In April 2023, Secretary General Peter Mathuki suggested the EAC should consider admitting Ethiopia following Somalia's accession. On 8 April 2024, Ministry of EAC Arid and Semi-arid Lands and Regional Development Cabinet Secretary Peninah Malonza claimed the EAC and Ethiopia were in the final stages of negotiation for admission into the bloc. This was later contradicted by Ethiopian Ministry of Foreign Affairs spokesperson Nebiu Tedla said that Ethiopia had made no request to join the EAC and that "the information is baseless." In addition, Kenyan President William Ruto raised the idea of Comoros joining the EAC while signing an agreement for deeper bilateral cooperation between Kenya and Comoros in July 2023. Comoros and existing member Tanzania have a maritime border.

== East African Confederation ==
The East African Confederation is a proposed intermediate step toward the formation of the East African Federation, which is envisioned as a political union of the eight members of the East African Community.

=== Overview ===
The aim is to deepen economic, political, and social integration, allowing member states to coordinate on matters of governance, defense, and economic policies while maintaining some level of national sovereignty during the transition. Once the confederation is successful and stable, the ultimate goal would be to create the East African Federation, which would function as a fully unified political entity with a shared government, currency, and legal systems.

Membership in the confederation will be voluntary, while membership in the future federation will be mandatory for all partner states. The confederation would have the authority to suspend or expel member states that violate the confederal constitution.

Key proponents of this confederation are primarily Kenya, Uganda, and Tanzania, with the additional interest of Rwanda, Burundi, and South Sudan. The concept has been under discussion for years, with leaders and policymakers addressing challenges such as differing political systems, economic disparities, and the need for a common legal framework.

=== History ===
The East African Community has been putting forward initiatives to fast-track political integration since 2004. A special summit held in Nairobi on 27–29 August 2004 examined ways and means of accelerating the integration process through a fast-track mechanism. The summit set up a Committee to Fast-Track the EAC Political Federation, dubbed the Wako Committee, to carry out wide consultations and finalize the work on the political federation. The Committee presented its report to the summit on 29 November 2004.

As a result of the consultative process, the office of Deputy Secretary-General responsible for Political Federation was established in 2006. Between 2006 and 2008, national consultations with stakeholders and various studies were undertaken to examine and facilitate political integration.

On 20 May 2017, the EAC Heads of State adopted the Political Confederation model as a transitional step towards a full political federation.

Since 2020, national consultations have been held in multiple EAC member states in order to draft the confederal constitution.

== Geography ==
At 5,449,717 km^{2} (2,104,147 sq mi)—including both the DRC and Somaliland—the EAF would be the largest country in Africa and seventh-largest in the world, replacing India. The EAF would span the continent from the Indian Ocean to the Atlantic Ocean, with a population of 343,328,958 as of 2024. Kinshasa would be the most populous city within the current member states by city limits and metropolitan area, with Dar es Salaam second by population within city limits and Nairobi second by population in the metropolitan area.

The EAF would have significant fresh water reserves. Lake Victoria, currently split between Uganda, Tanzania, and Kenya, is the second largest body of freshwater in the world, while Lake Tanganyika, mostly split between the DRC and Tanzania, is the third largest body of freshwater in the world. Lake Victoria and Lake Tanganyika comprise part of the African Great Lakes, caused by the East African Rift, a continental rift zone that bisects Tanzania, Kenya, and Ethiopia. These lakes include Lake Kivu bordering Rwanda, Lake Edward and Lake Albert on the Uganda-DRC border, Lake Rukwa in Tanzania, and Lake Turkana in Kenya, amongst many smaller but still significant lakes. The lakes are a source of water vapour, and also lead to the formation of lake breeze systems, which affect weather across large areas of East Africa. The east to west river valleys within the rift system, including the Turkana Channel in northern Kenya and the Zambezi river valley, concentrate low-level easterly winds and accelerate them towards Central Africa. This leaves East Africa drier than it otherwise would be, and also supports the high rainfall in the Congo Basin rainforest. Regions of higher elevation, including the Ethiopian Highlands and the Kenyan Highlands are hotspots of higher rainfall amid the semi-arid to arid lowlands of East Africa.

The eastern region of the DRC has plentiful mining operations, in particular the mining of cobalt. The mining sector of the EAC contributes around 2.3% of national GDP, with gold being the second highest exported product following petroleum in the fourth quarter of 2023. In the southeastern DRC lies the Copperbelt, known for its copper mining. Currently, the copper is majority exported via road with the exception of the Lobito Atlantic Railway, which stretches from Lobito, Angola to Kolwezi. The Lobito Corridor project, with $250 million in U.S. financial investment, would construct around 550 km (350 miles) of railway in Zambia along the Zambia-DRC border, with feeder roads connecting DRC copper mines to the new railway.

The East African Rift is the largest seismically active rift system on Earth today. This would make the EAF subject to many large earthquakes and volcanic activity. The EAF would include a number of active and dormant volcanoes, among them: Mount Kilimanjaro, Mount Kenya, Mount Longonot, Menengai Crater, Mount Karisimbi, Mount Nyiragongo, Mount Meru and Mount Elgon, as well as the Crater Highlands in Tanzania.

Somalia, Kenya, and Tanzania have a combined coastline of 4,985 kilometers on the Indian Ocean. If Somalia were to stabilize, the geography would be pertinent to an expansive port operation.

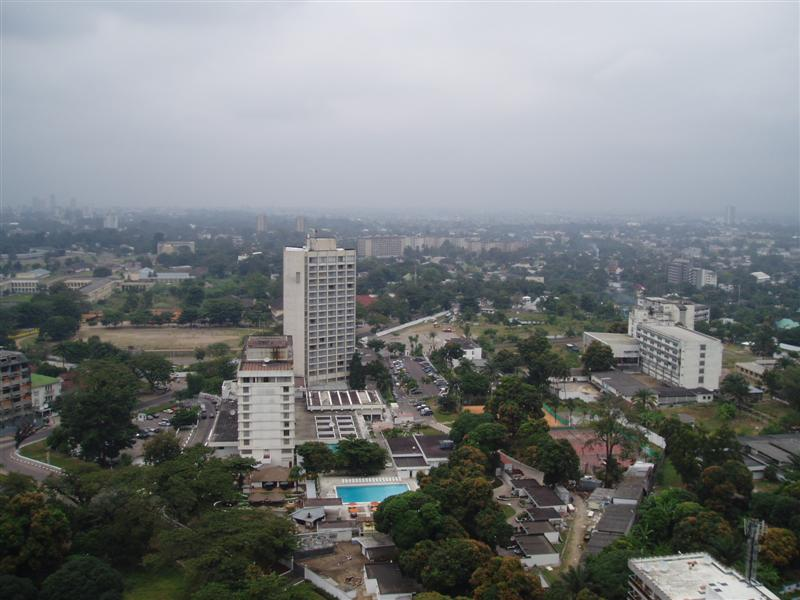
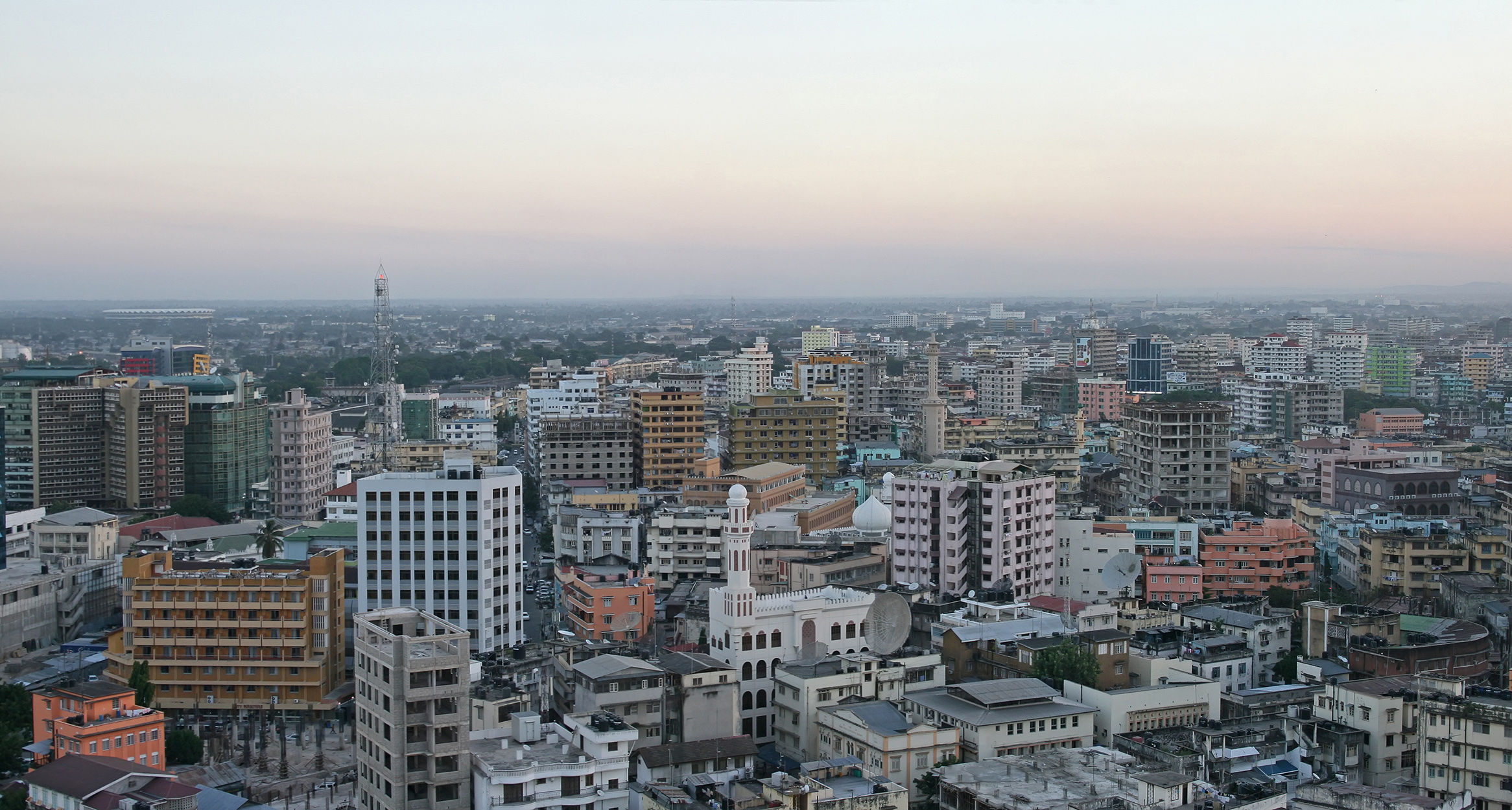
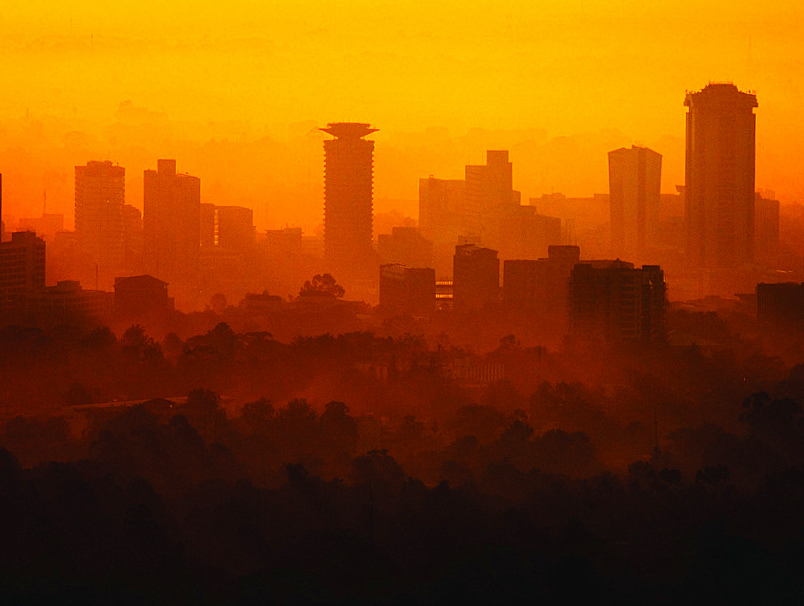
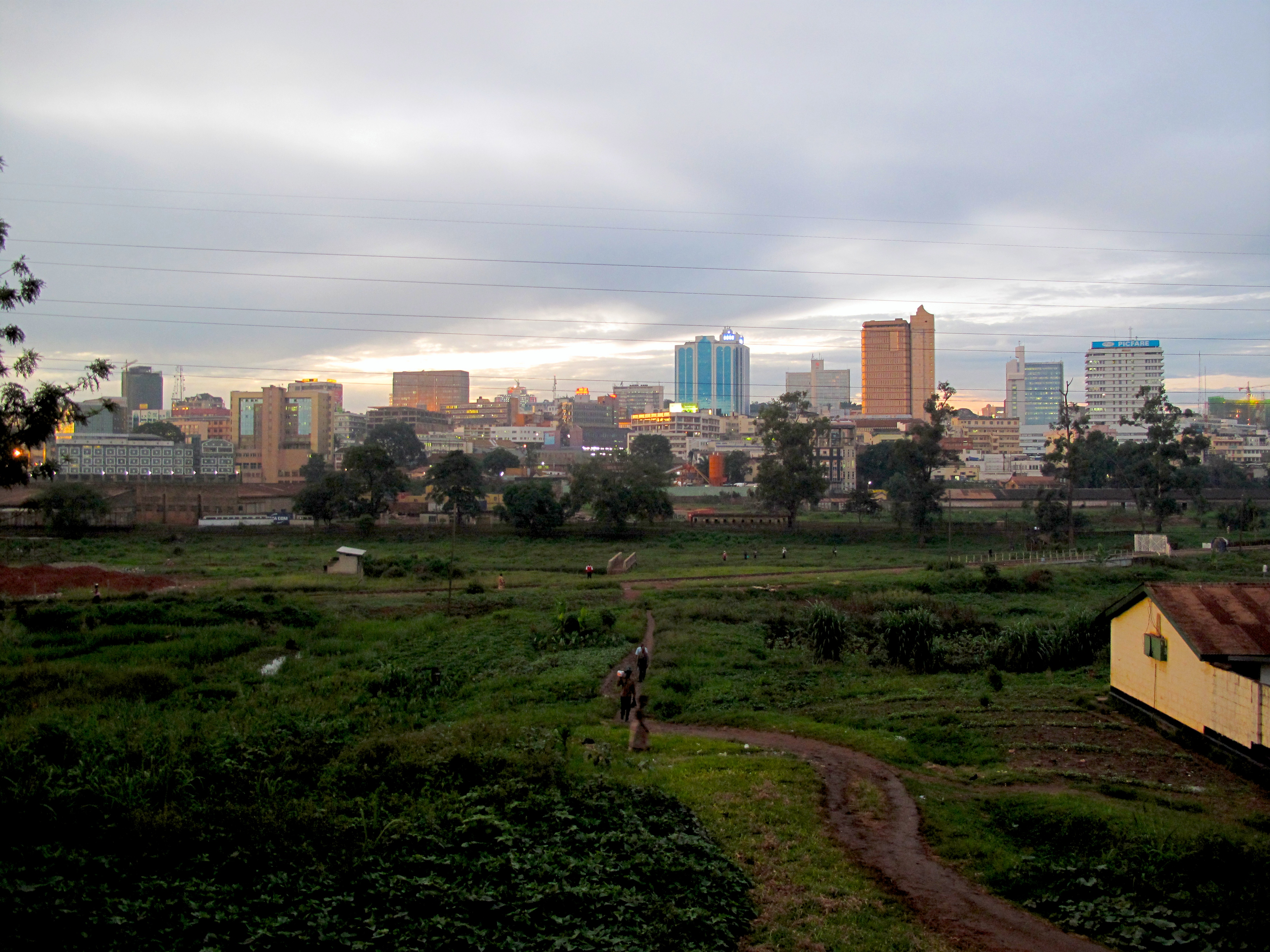
Largest population centres of the East African Community According to the most recent censuses and estimates
	Rank	City name	State	Pop.	Rank	City name	State	Pop.
Kinshasa Dar es Salaam	1	Kinshasa	Democratic Republic of the Congo	15,628,000	11	Mwanza	Tanzania	1,245,000	Nairobi Kampala
Kinshasa Dar es Salaam	2	Dar es Salaam	Tanzania	7,405,000	12	Kigali	Rwanda	1,208,000	Nairobi Kampala
Kinshasa Dar es Salaam	3	Nairobi	Kenya	5,119,000	13	Bukavu	Democratic Republic of the Congo	1,190,000	Nairobi Kampala
Kinshasa Dar es Salaam	4	Kampala	Uganda	3,652,000	14	Bujumbura	Burundi	1,139,000	Nairobi Kampala
Kinshasa Dar es Salaam	5	Mbuji-Mayi	Democratic Republic of the Congo	2,765,000	15	Tshikapa	Democratic Republic of the Congo	1,024,000	Nairobi Kampala
Kinshasa Dar es Salaam	6	Lubumbashi	Democratic Republic of the Congo	2,695,000	16	Bunia	Democratic Republic of the Congo	768,000	Nairobi Kampala
Kinshasa Dar es Salaam	7	Mogadishu	Somalia	2,610,000	17	Zanzibar	Tanzania	766,000	Nairobi Kampala
Kinshasa Dar es Salaam	8	Kananga	Democratic Republic of the Congo	1,593,000	18	Goma	Democratic Republic of the Congo	707,000	Nairobi Kampala
Kinshasa Dar es Salaam	9	Mombasa	Kenya	1,389,000	19	Uvira	Democratic Republic of the Congo	657,000	Nairobi Kampala
Kinshasa Dar es Salaam	10	Kisangani	Democratic Republic of the Congo	1,366,000	20	Mbeya	Tanzania	620,000	Nairobi Kampala

The EAC contains 15 cities with populations of over one million (half of which are in Democratic Republic of the Congo alone), the largest being Kinshasa. Kampala is the largest urban centre located on Lake Victoria, the second largest freshwater lake in the world and Mwanza coming in second and Kisumu third.

== Benefits ==
=== Markets and trading ===
The Treaty for the Establishment of an East African Community created four key goals of the community, later referred to as the "integration pillars". The first pillar is a customs union, introduced in 2005, which in theory allows for free trade within the community. The second pillar, a common market, is the current phase of the EAC. The theoretical common market is defined by the treaty as a "single market in which there is free movement of capital, labour, goods and services." This involves the harmonization of monetary and fiscal policy including convertibility of currency, exchange rate policy, and interest rate policy. Integration and standardization in these facets of the economy under a common market makes the area more economically appealing to a multinational corporation looking to operate in the region. Rather than navigating each member states' tax and fiscal policies, they would be dealing with one unified set of rules, leading to lower operating costs in the region. Following the customs union and common market, the EAC treaty states there is to be a monetary union under a single currency, with full federalization following. This would further induce internal trade and simplify outside economic investment. These economic advantages have been cited as a rationale for global powers such as the US not opposing the federalization of the EAC.

A survey conducted in Tanzania revealed that a majority of respondents thought that the union of the EAC would lead to better trading opportunities in the region, and a majority also responded that the union would provide better job availability in the region.

=== Youth bulge ===
The population of the constituent parts of the theoretical EAC is composed of 65% under 30-year-olds. This youth bulge is anticipated to grow to 75% of the population under the age of 25 in this region by 2030. Compared to the global percentage of the population that falls under the age of 25, which sits at 42% currently, this reflects the youth and opportunity of this region. Providing opportunities through the economically advantageous East African Community is paramount for the region and has been expressed as a driving force for the union.

== Challenges ==
=== Support and awareness of federalization ===
EAC Helpfulness (2014-15 Survey)
Country	EAC "helps a lot"	EAC "helps some- what"	EAC "helps a little"	EAC does nothing	Don't know
Uganda	20%	21%	15%	7%	37%
Kenya	16%	28%	27%	8%	20%
Tanzania	16%	28%	13%	16%	28%

Support and awareness of EAC organs and federation plans remains low in member states. Surveying of Tanzania in 2012 revealed that only 45% of Tanzanians have heard somewhat or a lot about an East African Federation while 55% have heard nothing or a little. 75% have heard nothing or a little about a joint parliament and 77% have heard nothing or a little about a single East African president. 70% of Tanzanians in 2012 approved of free movement of people, goods, and services, 55% approved the customs union and 54% approved of the proposed monetary union. On all three issues, share of people answering "Don't Know" has more than halved since 2008 indicating higher rates of civic engagement on EAC issues. Approval of a joint army went from 26% in 2008 to 38% in 2012, with the majority (53%) still disapproving. 32% support the formation of a unitary government, while 59% disapprove.

Surveying in Kenya in 2021 revealed that only 34% of Kenyans had heard some or a great deal on the proposed East African Federation, a 9-point rise from 2008. Awareness is higher amongst men, the elderly, the wealthy, and those with post-secondary education. Support for federalization stood at 44%, with 50% disapproving. 66% of people with post-Secondary education however disapproved. Those with no formal education were the most likely to approve. 52% approved free movement of people, goods, and services while 49% approved a monetary union. Awareness of EAC Organs in Kenya is low; 43% had heard nothing of the EALA, with only 29% hearing "some" or "a great deal". 47% of Kenyans said that their EALA representatives should be elected directly instead of elected by the Kenyan Parliament. Surveying in May 2015 in Uganda found that 69% support free movement across borders in the region. In Burundi, 64% supported free movement among the region. A combined 56% of Ugandans thought the EAC "helps a lot", "helps somewhat", or "helps a little" in their country. 71% of Kenyans thought the EAC helps in some capacity while 57% of Tanzanians thought the EAC helps in some capacity. (Note: Survey does not include option for "EAC harms") Outside of these countries, little polling has been done. A possible indicator of Congolese support however is the 31 October protests in Goma demanding that the DRC leave the EAC due to Rwanda's support of the M23.

=== Ethnic and linguistic differences ===
While the grouping of nations has adopted Swahili as their national language, there is a great deal of ethnolinguistic diversity within these groups. Different regional dialects and entirely different languages are spoken within the nations themselves, even more so when compared to one another. Tanzania achieved an ethnolinguistic score of 0.93 out of 1 by one study, ranking the highest out of 81 countries. Integrating a region where so many regional dialects are spoken will be difficult and could inhibit some of the economic benefits of the EAC.

=== Members' existing governments ===
These countries also vary greatly in terms of the adoption of democracy. Rwanda practically has closed elections with Paul Kagame having served as the president for the past 26 years and garnering over 99% of the vote in the 2024 general election to win his fourth term. In contrast, other member countries like Kenya host multi-party elections where the election is not as heavily corrupted. An even more significant concern for this Union is the lack of free governance throughout the eight nations. According to the Freedom House metric system, Kenya and Tanzania boast the highest Freedom scores of the eight nations and still only rank as partly free. Censorship of media outlets, restriction of voter rights, ballot fraud, and more instances of voter repression are present in all states. Merging nations with such corruption and anti-democratic establishments could pose a humanitarian crisis for the populations who could suffer from decreased freedoms and make cooperation amongst the different governing powers more difficult. A survey conducted in Tanzania revealed that 38% of respondents believed that the Union of EAC would make political corruption worse, while 33% thought it would lessen political corruption.

=== Economic challenges ===
While the union of these nations is recognized as economically advantageous, the mechanics of conforming to the EAC's standards has posed economic issues for some countries seeking to join the EAC. The economic prosperity of the nations attempting to join here varies greatly, with Burundi holding the lowest GDP at approximately US$3 billion, more than 100 billion less than Kenya's GDP (US$115 billion). This discrepancy in wealth has impeded the less wealthy nations from conforming with some of the standards set for the EAC. For instance, South Sudan took four years to accede to the EAC and still fails to meet many of the criteria set for the Community. The South Sudanese president has asked for aid from fellow member countries to meet these standards, citing a lack of staffing at customs, immigration, and revenue/tax collection as the main source for failure to meet the standards of the EAC integration process. Member nations have not been quick to help; nations such as Kenya and Uganda are still charging visa fees on South Sudanese citizens, something EAC countries are supposed to be exempt from as part of the Customs Union.

== Demographics ==
=== Religion ===
Religions of the EAF
1. Christianity (79.8%)
2. Islam (16.0%)
3. Traditional African religions, Animism (2.48%)
4. Unaffiliated (1.49%)
5. Other (Hinduism, Buddhism, etc.) (0.27%)

Data comes from CIA World Factbook or 2020 Pew Research estimates.

- Burundi: Roman Catholic 58.6%, Protestant 35.3% (Adventist 2.7%, other Protestant 32.6%), Muslim 3.4%, other 1.3%, none 1.3% (2016–17 CIA estimate)
- Democratic Republic of the Congo: Other Christian 36.5%, Roman Catholic 29.9%, Protestantism 26.7%, Kimbanguist 2.8%, Muslim 1.3%, none 1.3%, other 1.2%, unspecified 0.2% (2014 CIA estimate)
- Kenya: Christian 85.5% (Protestant 33.4%, Catholic 20.6%, Evangelical 20.4%, African Instituted Churches 7%, other Christian 4.1%), Muslim 10.9%, other 1.8%, none 1.6%, don't know/no answer 0.2% (2019 census)
- Rwanda: Protestant 57.7% (includes Adventist 12.6%), Roman Catholic 38.2%, Muslim 2.1%, none 1.1%, other 1% (includes traditional, Jehovah's Witness) (2019–20 CIA estimate)
- South Sudan: Christian 60.5%, Muslim 6.2%, folk religion 32.9%, other 0.5% (2020 Pew research estimate; last conducted census is a 2008 Sudanese census)
- Tanzania: Christian 63.1%, Muslim 34.1%, folk religion 1.1%, other 0.1%, unaffiliated 1.6% (2020 Pew research estimate)
- Uganda: Protestant 45.1% (Anglican 32.0%, Pentecostal/Born Again/Evangelical 11.1%, Seventh-day Adventist 1.7%, Baptist 0.3%), Roman Catholic 39.3%, Muslim 13.7%, other 1.6%, none 0.2% (2014 census)
- Somalia: Muslim 99.8%, other or unaffiliated 0.2% (2022 census)
- East African Federation: Christian 79.80%, Muslim 15.97%, folk religion 2.48%, unaffiliated 1.49%, other (Hinduism, Buddhism, etc.) 0.27% (2020 Pew Research estimate)

== See also ==
- African Union
- List of proposed state mergers
- Pan-Africanism
- Alliance of Sahel States
- Mittelafrika

== Sources ==
- Arnold, Guy (1974). Kenyatta and the Politics of Kenya. London: Dent. ISBN 0-460-07878-X.
- Assensoh, A. B. (1998). African Political Leadership: Jomo Kenyatta, Kwame Nkrumah, and Julius K. Nyerere. Malabar, Florida: Krieger Publishing Company. ISBN 9780894649110.
- Kyle, Keith (1997). "The Politics of the Independence of Kenya". Contemporary British History. 11 (4): 42–65. doi:10.1080/13619469708581458.
