= Oduor =

Oduor is a surname. Notable people with the surname include:

- Clarke Oduor (born 1999), Kenyan footballer
- Michael Oduor (born 1962), Kenyan judoka
- Mo Oduor (born 1978), Kenyan footballer
- Okwiri Oduor (born 1988/1989), Kenyan writer
- Rosemary Oduor (born c. 1967), Kenyan electrical engineer and corporate executive
