= Flag of the East African Community =

East African Community
- Use: International organisation
- Proportion: 11:20
- Adopted: 2008
- Design: A blue background with a thin yellow stripe fimbriated in green, overtop two thin stripes of black and red, fimbriated in white. In the center of the stripes is the emblem of the EAC.

The flag of the East African Community is the flag used since 2008 by the East African Community, an intergovernmental organization composed of eight countries in the African Great Lakes region in eastern Africa.

== Description ==
The Community Emblem Act, 2003 sets out the symbolism behind the flag.

- Blue: Lake Victoria signifying the unity of the EAC Partner States.
- White, Black, Green, Yellow, Red: Representing the different colours of the flags of each of the EAC Partner States.
- Handshake: East African Community.
- Centre: Emblem of the East African Community.

== History ==
The first version of the flag was adopted in 2003 by the Community Emblem Act, 2003 when the Community only consisted of three members: Kenya, Tanzania, and Uganda. In 2007, the Community expanded to include Burundi and Rwanda. In 2008, to take into account this expansion of membership the Community Emblems (Amendment) Act, 2008 was passed, which modified the emblem to include Burundi and Rwanda.

Despite South Sudan, the Democratic Republic of the Congo and Somalia having joined the Community in 2016, 2022 and 2024 respectively, the emblem (and by extension the flag) has not been modified to include them on the map.

== Gallery ==
Former flag of the EAC (1967–1977).

Variant without emblem
