= Civil Aviation Safety and Security Oversight Agency =

The Civil Aviation Safety and Security Oversight Agency (CASSOA) is an administrative agency of the East African Community (EAC), with headquarters in Entebbe, Uganda. CASSOA's mission is to improve safety by harmonizing civil aviation standards among the member states. The organization's responsibilities include airworthiness inspections of aircraft and airport facilities, organizing training for member states, and improving compliance with international standards. The eight member states are Kenya, Tanzania, Uganda, Rwanda, South Sudan, the Democratic Republic of the Congo, Burundi, and Somalia.

== See also ==
- International Civil Aviation Organization
