= Rosemary Oduor =

Kenyan engineer and corporate executive

- Born: c. 1967 (age 58–59); Kenya
- Education: Moi University; University of Nairobi
- Occupations: Electrical engineer and Corporate executive
- Years active: 1991 – present
- Known for: Professional competence
- Title: Acting CEO of Kenya Power and Lighting Company

Rosemary Oduor (born c. 1967), is a Kenyan electrical engineer and corporate executive, who works as the managing director and chief executive officer of Kenya Power and Lighting Company, in acting capacity, since August 2021. Before her current assignment, she worked as the general manager of commercial services and sales at the power company.

== Background and education ==
Rosemary Oduor is Kenyan by birth. After attending local primary and secondary schools, she was admitted to Moi University, where she graduated with a Bachelor of Technology degree, majoring in Electrical Engineering and Computer Engineering. Later, she obtained a Master of Business Administration from the University of Nairobi. She is a Professional Engineer and is registered with the Engineers Board of Kenya.

== Career ==
Oduor has spent most of her working career at Kenya Power and Lighting Company, having joined company in 1991. For a period of time, she worked as the acting regional manager of the power company's Western Region. She also worked as a line engineer at the power company before she became the general manager of commercial services and sales at KPLC. She is reported to be widely experienced in "power engineering and management".

== Other considerations ==
Rosemary Oduor's appointment as Acting CEO became effective on 4 August 2021. She replaced Bernard Ngugi who resigned after more than 32 years at KPLC, with the last two at the helm as CEO. In her current position as managing director and chief executive officer, she sits on the eleven-person board of directors of Kenya Power and Lighting Company.

== See also ==
- Vivienne Yeda Apopo
- Patrick Bitature
- Selestino Babungi
