= Emblem of the East African Community =

- Adopted: 2008
- Motto: Jumuiya ya Afrika Mashariki

The emblem of the East African Community is the emblem used since 2008 by the East African Community, an intergovernmental organisation composed of seven countries in the African Great Lakes region in eastern Africa.

== Description ==
The emblem features a map of Lake Victoria with the member states Burundi, Kenya, Rwanda, Tanzania, and Uganda around it. This is surrounded by an industrial wheel with a leave arch on either side with the letters 'EAC' at the top. At the bottom of the emblem is a pictogram of a handshake. Below this is written in Kiswahili is "Jumuiya ya Afrika Mashariki" which translates as 'East African Community'.

The colours used on the emblem are the same as those used on the flag of the East African Community which also features the emblem in its centre.

== History ==
The first version of the emblem was adopted in 2003 by the Community Emblem Act, 2003 when the Community only consisted of three members: Kenya, Tanzania, and Uganda. In 2007 the Community expanded to include Burundi and Rwanda. In 2008 to take into account this expansion of membership the Community Emblems (Amendment) Act, 2008 was passed, which modified the emblem to include Burundi and Rwanda.

Despite South Sudan, the Democratic Republic of the Congo and Somalia having joined the Community in 2016, 2022 and 2024 respectively, the emblem has not been modified to include them on the map.
