= Wimbo wa Jumuiya Afrika Mashariki =

Intergovernmental anthem

Wimbo wa Jumuiya ya Afrika Mashariki
English: East African Community anthem
- Official anthem of East African Community
- Also known as: "Jumuiya Yetu" (English: "Our Community")
- Lyrics: Collectively
- Music: John Mugango, 2010
- Adopted: 2010; 16 years ago

"Wimbo wa Jumuiya ya Afrika Mashariki" or "Jumuiya Yetu" (English: "East African Community anthem" or English: "Our community" ) is the official anthem of the East African Community. It is a Swahili language hymn.

== Etymology ==
The word Jumuiya in Swahili means community and its title therefore translates as "East African Community anthem".

== History ==
"Wimbo wa Jumuiya ya Afrika Mashariki" was composed by Richard Khadambi in 2010.

== Lyrics ==
Swahili

Ee Mungu twaomba ulinde
Jumuiya Afrika Mashariki
Tuwezeshe kuishi kwa amani
Tutimize na malengo yetu

Chorus:
Jumuiya Yetu sote tuilinde
Tuwajibike tuimarike
Umoja wetu ni nguzo yetu
Idumu Jumuiya yetu

Uzalendo pia mshikamano
Viwe msingi wa Umoja wetu
Natulinde Uhuru na Amani
Mila zetu na desturi zetu

Chorus

Viwandani na hata mashambani
Tufanye kazi sote kwa makini
Tujitoe kwa hali na mali
Tuijenge Jumuiya bora

Chorus

Literal English translation

Oh God we pray for preservation
of the East African Community;
Let us to live in peace
May we fulfil our objectives

Chorus:
We should protect/guard our Community
We should be committed and stand strong
Our unity is our anchor
Long live our community

Patriotism and togetherness
Be the pillars of our unity
May we guard our independence and peace
Our culture and traditions

Chorus

In industries and farms
We should work together
We should work hard
We should build a better Community

Chorus

== See also ==
- Anthems of international organizations
