= Peninah Malonza =

Kenyan politician

- Born: March 7, 1974 (age 52); Kitui County Kenya
- Education: University of Nairobi; (Bachelor of Anthropology); (Master's in Project Planning and Management); (Master of Public Health); Gachon University; (Course in Economic Recovery Models)
- Occupations: Psychologist, politician and management consultant
- Years active: 2002–present
- Title: Former cabinet secretary Ministry of EAC, Arid and Semi-Arid Lands and Regional Development
- Predecessor: Rebecca Miano

Peninah Malonza, OGW (born 7 March 1974), is a Kenyan politician who served as the cabinet secretary for Ministry of EAC, Arid and Semi-Arid Lands and Regional Development, in the Cabinet of Kenya, and ex officio member of the East African Legislative Assembly (EALA) effective 5 October 2023 to July 11, 2024. She was dismissed from the cabinet in July 2024. Prior to this appointment, from 27 September 2022 until 4 October 2023, she served as the cabinet secretary for tourism, wildlife and heritage, the president of the 13th Governing Council of the Parties to Lusaka Agreement Task Force (LATF) on Cooperative Enforcement Operations Directed at Illegal Trade in Wild Fauna and Flora as well as the vice chairperson of World Tourism Organization (UNWTO) Regional Commission for Africa (CAF).

She served as the first deputy governor of Kitui County, between 2013 and 2017, where as a member of the county executive management team, she managed and coordinated the implementation of both county and national government legislation.

== Early life and education ==
Malonza was born in Kitui County on 7 March 1974. After attending local primary and secondary schools, she was admitted to the University of Nairobi where she graduated with a Bachelor of Arts degree in Anthropology. She followed that with Master's degree in Project Planning and Management, from the same university. As of November 2022, she was pursuing a Master of Public Health at the University of Nairobi. She undertook a course in economic recovery models at Kyungwon University, in South Korea. Later, she undertook a course in community leadership, at the Global University, in the United States. Malonza has a diploma in psychological counseling and is a member of the Kenya Association of Professional Counsellors.

== Career ==
From 2002 to 2006, she was project director at Changamwe Baptist Church. She later served in various roles at Compassion International Kenya, rising to the level of partner training and support as senior director from 2006 to 2013. From 2013 to 2017, she served as deputy governor of Kitui County under Governor Julius Malombe. Prior to joining politics she previously served as a project coordinator at AMREF Kenya.

In 2022, she unsuccessfully contested for the women’s representative seat in Kitui County. She was nominated as the cabinet secretary tourism, wildlife, and heritage by President Ruto. The national assembly committee on appointments initially rejected her nomination as tourism cabinet secretary, but was later on approved as the cabinet secretary for tourism, by the parliamentary plenary. She was later dismissed by President William Ruto in July 2024.

In addition to being one of the 10 women chosen by President William Ruto, Ms. Malonza is one of only two ministers from the Ukambani region and the first cabinet secretary to ever come from Kitui South since independence.

== Awards ==
In 2015, she was awarded the Order of Grand Warrior (OGW) award by President Uhuru Kenyatta.

She was awarded the 2023 Africa Tourism Woman of the Year Award at the Africa Public Sector Conference and Awards (APSCA) having done a commendable work on policy in the tourism sector.
