= East African School of Taxation =

Trade school in South Africa

The East African School of Taxation provides tax training and consultancy services in East Africa. The school is located in Kampala, Uganda, and is the first taxation school in East Africa. It offers courses in income tax and revenue administration, certificates of merit in taxation, and tailor-made courses in taxation for parastatal organizations, the private sector, local governments and small and medium enterprises. The school also offers training in facilitating tax planning processes, salary, and benefits tax consultancy, tax management systems and tax audits.

The school aims to attract revenue officials, lawyers, financial managers, accountants and economists from the Uganda Revenue Authority; the Ministry of Finance, Planning and Economic Development; the Tax Appeals Tribunal; law firms and non-profit organizations.
