= Florence Akiiki Asiimwe =

Ugandan politician

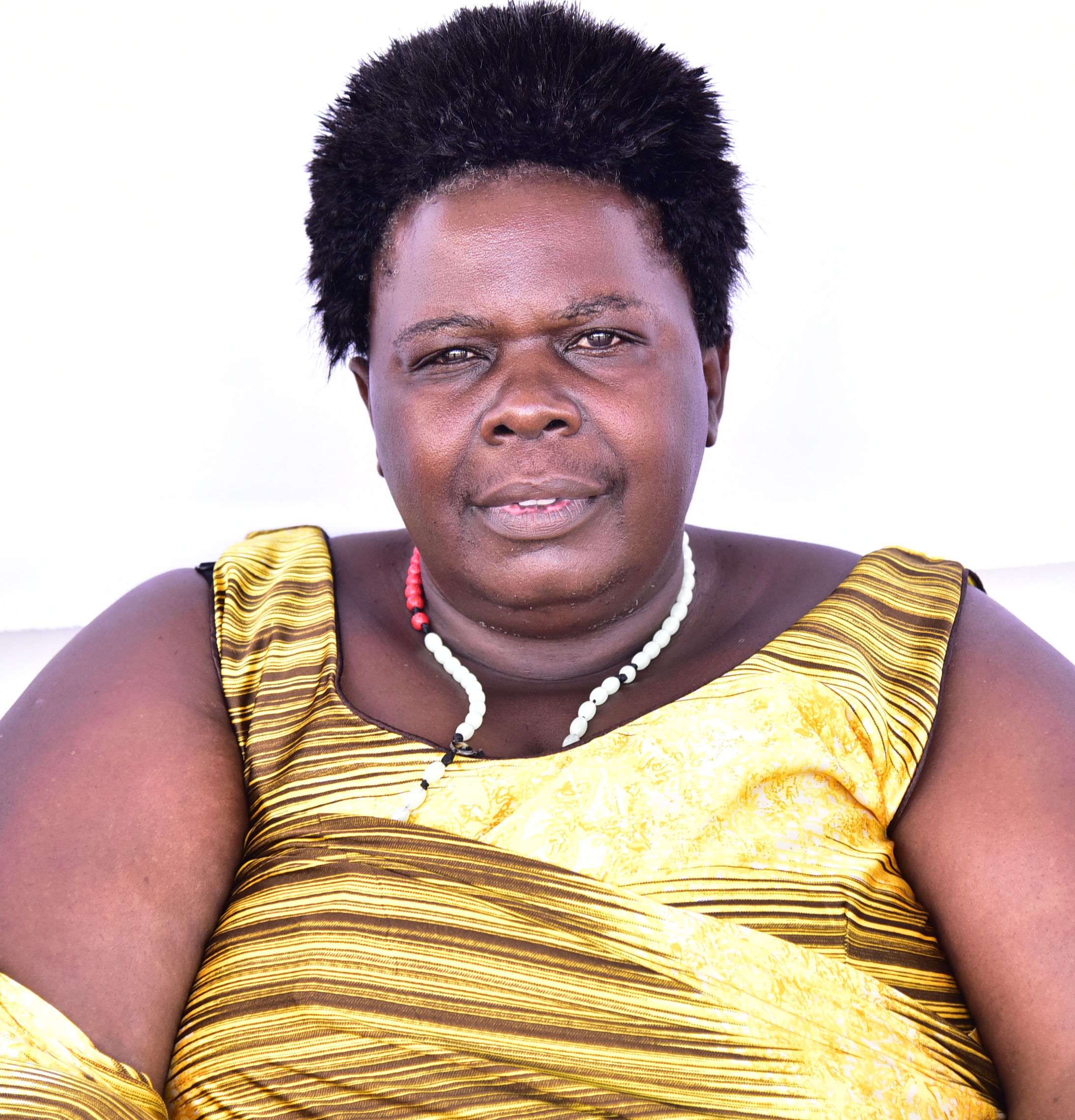
- Citizenship: Uganda
- Education: University of Cape Town (PhD); Institute of Social Studies (MA)
- Occupations: Politician, author, lecturer
- Political party: National Resistance Movement

Florence Akiiki Asiimwe is a Ugandan politician, author, and lecturer. On January 14, 2021, she was elected as the representative of parliament for Masindi District in the 11th Parliament of Uganda. She is affiliated to the National Resistance Movement party which has been the ruling party since 1986.

== Career and education ==
Asiimwe holds a PhD in sociology from the University of Cape Town and a Master of Arts in development studies from the International Institute of Social Studies from The Hague, Netherlands.

== Academic career ==
She worked as a senior lecturer at the Department of Sociology at Makerere University, a part-time lecturer at the University of the Western Cape, and a visiting scholar at Kyoto University.[3] Asiimwe has published books titled Community Mobilisation Skills in 2007 and The Untold Stories: Gender and Homeownership in Urban Uganda in 2011.[4][5][6]

== Political career ==
During the 2021 Ugandan general election on January 14, 2021, she was elected as the representative of parliament for Masindi District in the 11th Parliament of Uganda.
