= Molly Musiime Asiimwe =

Ugandan politician

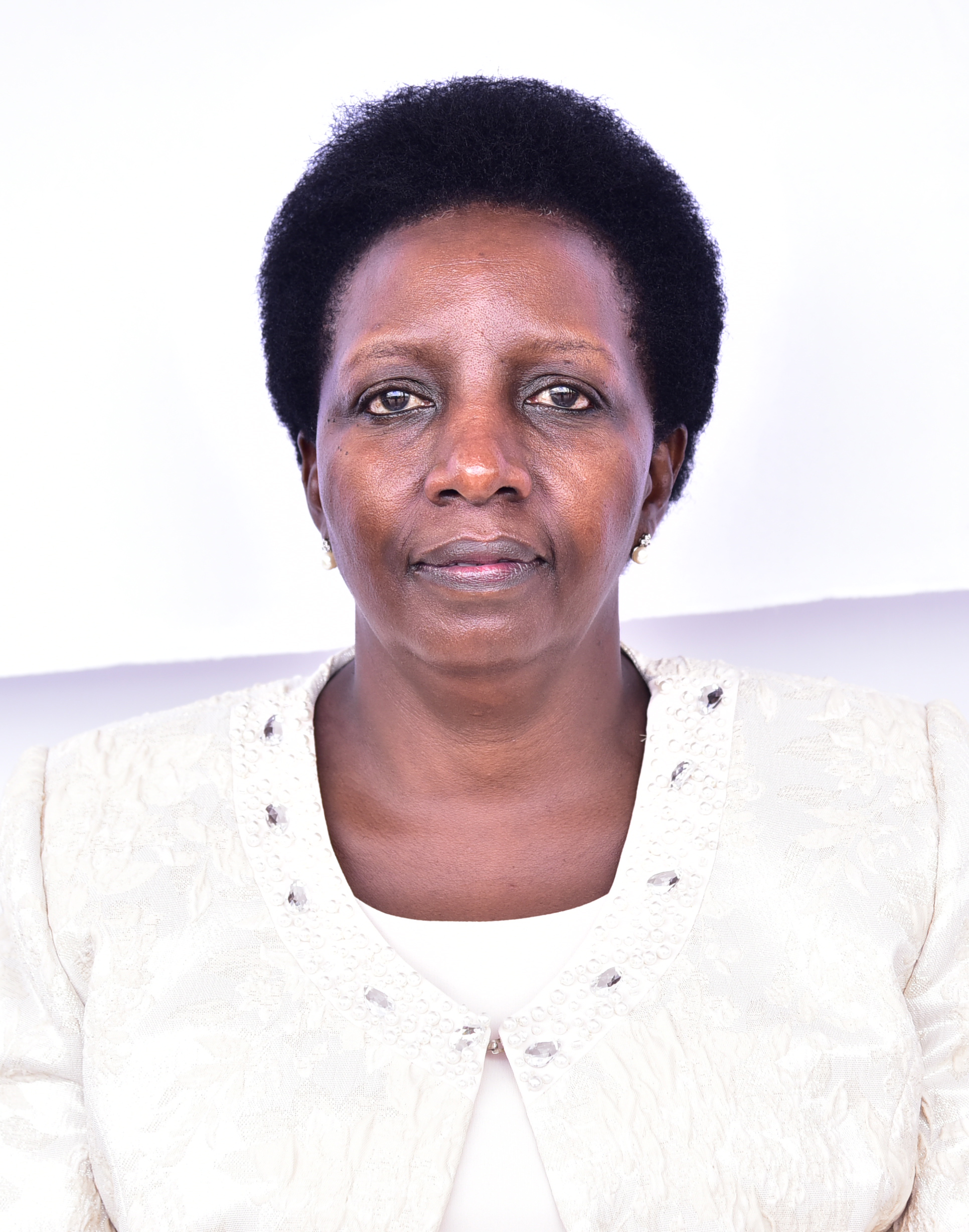

Woman Member of Parliament for Rwampara District
- Incumbent
- Assumed office 2021

Personal details
- Born: Uganda
- Party: National Resistance Movement
- Occupation: Politician
- Known for: Woman Member of Parliament for Rwampara District
- Committees: Committee on Education and Sports

Molly Musiime Asiimwe is a Ugandan politician and a professional teacher who served as the member of Parliament for Rwampara County in the 11th parliament of Uganda.

== Early life and education background ==
She was born on 18th March 1962 in Rushere Kiruhura District and married to Mr. Stephen Asiimwe. She went to Rushere Primary School for her Primary Education and Bweranyangi Girls' Senior Secondary School for her secondary studies and served as the head girl at both schools.In 1991, she joined Makerere University where she pursued her Bachelors of Arts degree in languages and literature. she also went ahead and acquired a Post graduate diploma in Education.

Molly also has a masters' degree in Organizational Leadership and Management from the Development Associates International in the US but was awarded at Uganda Christian University in Mukono. She also has Post graduate training and certifications in Procurement, human resources, finance and other fields.

== Career and Professional Work Experience ==
Molly was a teacher at Gayaza High School and Makerere College School after getting her degree in Education. she then worked as the project manager with Danida Projects after leaving teaching.

She then worked with Uganda Revenue Authority and NUSAF and was later appointed Principal Private Secretary of the First Lady. In 2020, she contested for contested for the Rwampara Woman representative seat on the NRM ticket during the NRM primaries and won and later won even during the 2021 general elections. She was appointed to work on the committee of Education and sports from May 2021 - May 2026.

She lost in the 2025 NRM primaries to Annah Kansiime after overturning Molly's victory and declaring Annah as the rightful flag bearer. Molly withdrew from the race seeking to retain her seat in parliament.

== Achievements and awards ==
She is the first Woman representative of Parliament of the newly created Rwampara District. she was named the best-performing legislator among the 12 district women legislators from Ankole subregion by the report published by the Ankole Political Activists Club in a report published in January 2022. she also spearheaded a fundraising towards a new maternity ward at Kinoni Health Centre IV to improve health of mothers in Rwampara County.

== Personal life ==
She was born on 18th March 1962, she is married to Stephen Asiimwe and was a professional teacher before joining elective politics.

== See also ==
- List of members of the eleventh Parliament of Uganda
- National Resistance Movement
- Parliament of Uganda.
- Member of Parliament.
- Rwempara District.

== Controversies ==
The high court in Mbarara dismissed a case that was aimed at preventing Molly Asiimwe from being selected as the NRM candidate for the position of woman MP for Rwampara County.
