= Kenya Institute for Public Policy Research and Analysis =

Kenyan research institute

The Kenya Institute for Public Policy Research and Analysis (KIPPRA) is an autonomous public institute that was established in May 1997 through a Legal Notice and commenced operations in June 1999. In January 2007, the President of Kenya signed the KIPPRA Bill into law and the KIPPRA Act No. 15 of 2006 commenced on 1 February 2007.

== Activities ==
The Institute undertakes the following activities:

- Conducts objective research and analysis on public policy issues with the goal of providing advice topolicymakers.
- Provides advisory and technical services on public policy issues to the Government, government agencies, and other stakeholders.
- Collects and analyses relevant data on public policy and disseminates its research findings to a wide range of stakeholders through workshops/conferences, internal seminars, research papers, policy briefs, a newsletter, and the Kenya Economic Report.
- Develops and maintains research resources and databases on public policy and related issues, and avails these to the Government, the private sector and academic institutions.
- Undertakes contracted public policy research and analysis for the government and clients from the private sector.
- Undertakes capacity building activities for government and private sector officers.
- Serves as a point of contact and encourages exchange of views between the Government, private sector and other civil society.

== Divisions ==
The Institute has five research divisions: Macroeconomics, Productive Sector, Social Sector, Infrastructure and Economic Services, Private Sector Development, Trade and Foreign Policy and Governance Division.

The research divisions are coordinated through the office of the Programmes Coordinator. The research divisions are supported by Knowledge Management and Communications Division, Finance and Investments Division, and Human Resource and Administration Division.
