= Caroline Asiimwe =

Ugandan conservationist

- Education: University of Edinburgh (Master's degree in veterinary science ) Masters, public health, Makerere University, Makerere University
- Occupations: Veterinary, researcher, conservationist, public health specialist
- Awards: 1. TWAS-Samira Omar Prize winner for Innovation for Sustainability Prize

2. Presidential Diamond Jubilee medal Caroline Asiimwe is an Ugandan veterinary and environment conservation leader and researcher. She engages the local population in a cooperative approach to preserve wildlife from illegal activities and ensure healthy ecosystems in Uganda.

In 2017, Asiimwe was named a TWAS-Samira Omar Prize winner for Innovation for Sustainability Prize. The Innovation for Sustainability Prize is awarded to scientists for their contribution in a multidisciplinary area directly relevant to the science of sustainability. In 2024 March on women's day, Dr Asiimwe was awarded a presidential Diamond Jubilee medal recognising her contribution to conservation in Uganda

== Early life and career ==
Asiimwe holds a master's degree in veterinary science at the University of Edinburgh in Scotland. Assimwe has been working as a veterinary and conservation coordinator in hand with carrying out research on the management of natural resources at the Budongo Conservation Field Station in Uganda for 7 years

Asiimwe collects data to ensure sustainable conservation of Ugandan resources. She attended Makerere University in Uganda's capital city.

Her research work includes: Maternal cannibalism in two populations of wild chimpanzees(2019), Impact of Snare Injuries on Parasite Prevalence in Wild Chimpanzees (Pan troglodytes),(2016), Cars kill chimpanzees: case report of a wild chimpanzee killed on a road at Bulindi, Uganda(2016), Programme level implementation of malaria rapid diagnostic tests (RDTs) use: outcomes and cost of training health workers at lower level health care facilities in Uganda(2012).
