= Vivienne Yeda Apopo =

Kenyan banker and business attorney

- Born: Vivienne Yeda; Kenya
- Citizenship: Kenya
- Education: University of Nairobi (LLB); Edith Cowan University (MBA); University of London (LLM)
- Occupations: Banker, Business Attorney
- Years active: 1990 — present
- Known for: Legal Skills, Administrative Skills
- Title: Director General of the East African Development Bank

Vivienne Yeda Apopo is a Kenyan banker and business attorney. She is the Director General of East African Development Bank (EADB). A position she was appointed to on the 15 January 2009. Since March 14, 2011, she has also serves as a member of the board of directors of the Central Bank of Kenya.

== Early life and education ==
Apopo was born Vivienne Yeda, in Kenya, on 12th, May 1964. She obtained a Master of Business Administration (MBA) from Edith Cowan University in Australia. She also obtained a Master of Laws (LLM) degree from the University of London.

== Career ==
She was appointed East Africa Development Bank EADB Director General in January 2009. Prior to her employment at EADB, Ms. Apopo worked for the African Development Bank (AfDB), as the Resident Representative and Country Manager for Zambia. Prior to that, circa 2006, she served as "Director of Legal Affairs at the EADB".

In November 2020, she was appointed chairperson of the board of directors of Kenya Power and Lighting Company, the parastatal, public utility responsible for bulk purchase, distribution, marketing and retailing of electric energy in Kenya.

== Recognition ==
In May 2014, Vivienne Yeda Apopo, was recognized for her work at EADB, when she was awarded the "African Banker of the Year Award", by the annual African Bank Award Ceremony, held in Kigali, Rwanda. The African Banker Awards are organised by African Banker magazine and BusinessinAfrica Events (BIAE). The awards are sponsored by the AfDB, the EADB, Emerging Markets Payments, MasterCard International, and other leading industry organisations. In October 2014, she was named "Business Leader of the Year", by the Africa-America Institute, at an awards ceremony held in New York, in recognition of her contribution to "development banking, finance and business in Africa for over 20 years".
