= 21st EAC Ordinary summit =

21st EAC Ordinary summit The 21st Ordinary summit of Heads of State of The East African Community
- Host country: Tanzania
- Date: 22 February 2021 - 25 February 2021
- Venues: Virtual
- Participants: Burundi; Kenya; Rwanda; South Sudan; Tanzania; Uganda
- Follows: 20th EAC Ordinary summit

The 21st EAC Ordinary summit was held between 22 February 2021 to 25 February 2021 virtually. This was the first summit held after the start of COVID-19 pandemic. The summit focused on considering applications of new members along with re-organizing the leadership of the bloc. The leadership of the community was transferred from Paul Kagame of Rwanda to Uhuru Kenyatta or Kenya.

== Participants ==
Country	Title	Dignitary
Burundi	President	Évariste Ndayishimiye
Kenya	President	Uhuru Kenyatta
Rwanda	President	Paul Kagame
South Sudan	President	Salva Kiir
Uganda	President	Yoweri Museveni
Tanzania	Vice-President	Samia Suluhu Hassan

== Agenda ==
=== New Members ===
While South Sudan is a full member of the EAC, the state is behind in timelines to integrate its systems into the regional bloc. The heads of state directed the council to expedite the accelerate the process. The summit also noted that the application by Somalia had not begun the verification process and requested the committee to follow up on the exercise.

The Democratic Republic of the Congo made a formal application to join the community and the heads of state considered the application for their admission at the 22nd EAC Ordinary summit.

=== Leadership ===
The summit oversaw the appointment of a new Secretary General of the East African Community, Peter Mathuki of Kenya, who took over the position for a non-renewable 5-year term from Libérat Mfumukeko of Burundi.
