= Tri Yogo Jatmiko =

Indonesian diplomat (born 1967)

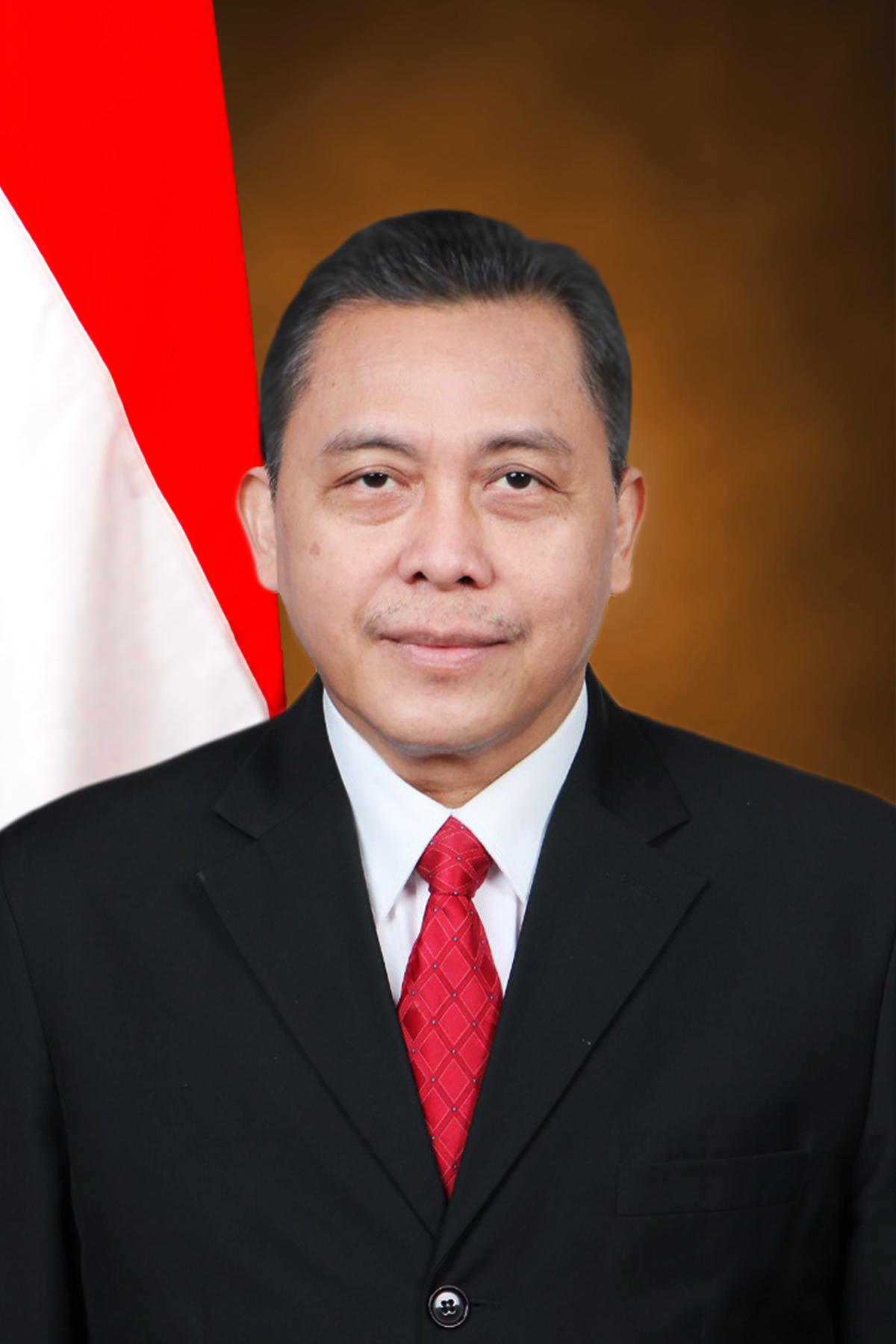

Ambassador of Indonesia to Tanzania, Burundi, Rwanda, and the East African Community
- Incumbent
- Assumed office 17 November 2021
- President: Joko Widodo; Prabowo Subianto
- Preceded by: Ratlan Pardede

Personal details
- Born: 28 April 1967 (age 58) Banyumas, East Java, Indonesia
- Spouse: Ratna Jayanti
- Education: University of Indonesia; Monash University

Tri Yogo Jatmiko (born 28 April 1967) is an Indonesian diplomat who is serving as Indonesia's ambassador to Tanzania, with concurrent accreditation to Burundi, Rwanda, and the East African Community since 17 November 2021. Tri served in various postings in Indonesia's foreign ministry and representative abroad, including his most recent assignment as inspector for the 2nd region in the foreign ministry's inspectorate general.

== Early life and education ==
Tri was born on 28 April 1967 in Banyumas as the son of a police officer. During his father's service as police chief of Karang Moncol, Purbalingga, he attended the inauguration of the General Sudirman Monument in Rembang by the armed forces deputy commander General Surono Reksodimedjo, which left a lasting impression on General Sudirman to him.

Tri entered the University of Indonesian in 1985, where he majored in German literature. He enrolled into the student regiment on his freshmen year and participated in various inter-university activities across Indonesia, including the 1987 General Sudirman guerilla route tracing in East Java, the 1989 I Gusti Ngurah Rai route tracing in Bali, and a reforestation activity organized by the University of Mataram in Lombok. According to Tri, during the 1987 route tracing, he skipped classes to "deeply internalize the general's fighting spirit". He was appointed to lead the student regiment by the university's rector, Sujudi, in November 1988. He graduated from the university with a bachelor's degree in 1991.

== Career ==
Tri briefly worked at the Singapore Airlines, becoming the chairman of the union of Indonesian workers in the airlines from 1993 to 1994. Afterwards, he resigned and joined the foreign ministry in March 1994. Upon several years of stint in the foreign ministry, he pursued his master's degree at the Monash University from 1997 to 1999. He received his first overseas assignment at the embassy in Manila, where he served as information staff with the rank of second secretary from 2000 to 2004. During his tenure, in 2002 he visited Agus Dwikarna, an Indonesian citizen who joined the Jemaah Islamiyah and Al-Qaeda, and was arrested at Camp Crame.

Following his assignment in Manila, he was posted to the permanent mission to the United Nations in New York as political staff with the rank of first secretary from 2006 to 2011. During this period, he was Indonesia's delegate to the United Nations Committee on Information, in which he lauded UN's efforts in maintaining an Indonesian language version of the website and for the committee in delivering a clear and focused strategy of delivering its messages.

Around the end of 2014, Tri was nominated as Indonesia's consul in Songkhla. His nomination was approved by the cabinet on 6 January 2015, although the foreign ministry requested to revise his area of duties with the addition of the Pattani province. Tri's area of duty expansion was approved on 24 February, and Tri began his duties on 20 April 2015. During his tenure, he improved the distribution of Indonesian language teachers from Indonesia to Southern Thailand and organized community service program placements for Indonesian university students in the region, coordinating closely with Indonesia's Ministry of Education and Culture. He also oversaw the establishment of Indonesian Corners at the Phuket campus of the Prince of Songkla University in 2015 and at Yala Rajabhat University in 2018.

Upon serving in Songkhla, on 4 April 2018 Tri assumed duties as inspector for second region in the foreign ministry's inspectorate general, which supervises Indonesian embassies and diplomatic missions in Western, Central, and Eastern Europe, as well as monitoring the directorate general of American and European Affairs, Multilateral Affairs, and Legal and International Treaties. In 2021, Tri's second inspectorate audit team received the Best Audit Team award for 2020.

In June 2021, Tri was nominated by President Joko Widodo as ambassador for Tanzania, with concurrent accreditation to Burundi, Rwanda, and the East African Community . Upon passing an assessment by the House of Representative's first commission in July, he was installed as ambassador on 17 November. He presented his credentials to President Samia Suluhu Hassan of Tanzania on 14 January 2022, to President Paul Kagame of Rwanda on 26 April 2022, to President Évariste Ndayishimiye of Burundi on 27 June 2022, and to secretary general of the East African Community Veronica Nduva on 13 August 2024. In January 2025, Tri appointed attorney Athanase Rutabingwa as Indonesia's honorary consul to Rwanda.

== Personal life ==
Tri is married to Ratna Jayanti.
