= Stephen Mbundi =

Tanzanian Diplomat

8th Secretary General of the East African Community
- Incumbent
- Assumed office 7 March 2026
- Preceded by: Veronica Nduva

Permanent Secretary in the Foreign Ministry responsible for East African Community Affairs
- In office September 2023 – 7 March 2026
- President: Samia Suluhu Hassan

Personal details
- Born: 12 August 1968 (age 58) Dar es Salaam, Tanzania
- Education: University of Dar es Salaam (BA); Makerere University (MA)

Stephen Patrick Mbundi (born 12 August 1968) is a Tanzanian diplomat and the current Secretary General of the East African Community.

== Early life and career ==
Mbundi was born in Kinondoni District in Dar es Salaam.

He holds a bachelor's degree in economics from the University of Dar es Salaam and a master's degree in Economic Policy Management from Makerere University.
