= 17th EAC Extra Ordinary summit =

17th EAC Extra Ordinary summit The 17th EAC Extra-Ordinary summit of Heads of State of The East African Community
- Host country: Tanzania
- Date: 8 September 2016
- Cities: Dar-es-salaam
- Venues: State House
- Participants: Burundi; Kenya; Rwanda; South Sudan; Tanzania; Uganda
- Follows: 16th EAC Extra Ordinary summit
- Precedes: 18th EAC Ordinary summit

The 17th EAC Extra Ordinary summit was held on 8 September 2016 in Dar es Salaam, Tanzania. The summit was held with regards to the European Union and East African Community Economic Partnership agreement. Furthermore, the unrest in Burundi and South Sudan was discussed.

== Participants ==
Country	Title	Dignitary
Burundi	Minister of External Relations	Aime Nyamitwe
Kenya	Deputy-President	William Ruto
Rwanda	President	Paul Kagame
Uganda	President	Yoweri Museveni
Tanzania	President	John Magufuli
Observing Participants
Zanzibar	President	Ali Mohamed Shein
South Sudan	Special envoy	Aggery Sabuni

== Agenda ==
=== Economic Partnership Agreement ===
The EU-Economics Partnership Agreement (EPA) was the key agenda to the meeting. The heads of states discussed a report from the council of ministers with regards to the EPA. Two member states namely Kenya and Rwanda had already agreed to sign the EPA, however, the other states requested more time to analyze the agreement. Tanzania was the main opponent to signing the EPA agreement and prevented the entire block from signing the agreement. The leaders agreed to delay the signing of the agreement by three months and requested the Secretary General of the East African Community to request an extension from the European Union.

=== Burundi ===
The heads of state also received a report from Benjamin Mkapa, who is the facilitator of the Inter-Burundi dialogue. The heads of states condemned the continued unrest and political instability in the country and approved all the requested interventions as requested by Mkapa. The entire budget for the Inter-Burundi dialogue was approved by the heads of state.

=== South Sudan ===
The heads of states congratulated the council of ministers from South Sudan for fully completing the process to join the East African Community. The council then presented an outline of how the country plans to integrate into the community and their detailed road map was scheduled to be released to the public at the next summit scheduled for November 2016.

=== New Deputy Secretary general ===
The heads of state took into consideration that Rwanda recommended that Christophe Bazivamo of Rwanda to be appointed as a Deputy Secretary general of the community. Bazivamo was sworn in at the summit and is appointed at the post for a three-year term with effect from 8 September 2016.
