= 20th EAC Ordinary summit =

20th EAC Ordinary summit The 20th Ordinary summit of Heads of State of The East African Community
- Host country: Tanzania
- Date: 1 February 2019
- Cities: Arusha
- Venues: Arusha Int. Conference Center
- Participants: Burundi; Kenya; Rwanda; South Sudan; Tanzania; Uganda
- Follows: 19th EAC Ordinary summit
- Precedes: 21st EAC Ordinary summit

The 20th EAC Ordinary summit was held on 1 February 2019 in Arusha, Tanzania. The summit was rescheduled twice from November 2018 and December 2018 due to the absence of Burundi. The focus of the summit was to arrive on a conclusion for the EU-EAC EPA agreement and to further grow domestic manufacturing in the region. The leadership of the community was transferred from Yoweri Museveni of Uganda to Paul Kagame of Rwanda.

== Participants ==
Country	Title	Dignitary
Burundi	Vice President	Gaston Sindimwo
Kenya	President	Uhuru Kenyatta
Rwanda	President	Paul Kagame
South Sudan	Minister of Trade, Industry and EAC Affairs	Paul Mayom Akech
Uganda	President	Yoweri Museveni
Tanzania	President	John Magufuli

== Agenda ==
=== Manufacturing ===
Various sectors of development were discussed as a sector of growth such as Textile, Apparel and Agro-processing. As part of the 19th EAC ordinary summit the leaders were looking to reduce the importation of used vehicles and in turn grow the local vehicle assembly and manufacturing businesses. The council is looking to establish a new platform called the Regional Automotive Industry Platform of East Africa (Raipea) to help facilitate a system to allow regional members to produce vehicle components. Partner states aim to save more than $2 billion annually in car import costs from the platform.

=== Economic Partnership Agreement ===
The European Economic Partnership agreement continues to be and important trade agreement that is still pending partner state approval. Museveni continued to reiterate that he is engaging with EU officials to ensure that a satisfactory agreement is agreed upon soon. Kenya & Rwanda are still the only members to sign the EU-EAC EPA. At the meeting it was decided that only four months will be given to partner states to sign the agreement. In 2016 it was decided that the agreement be signed as a regional block to give the bloc better leverage in negotiating terms. However, Tanzania who needed more time to review the terms and Burundi whose relationship with the EU is shaky, have not signed the terms. Tanzania still argued they needed more time and the heads of states decided that after the four months, partner states will be advised to sign the agreement individually.
