= Richard Sezibera =

Rwandan medical doctor, diplomat and politician

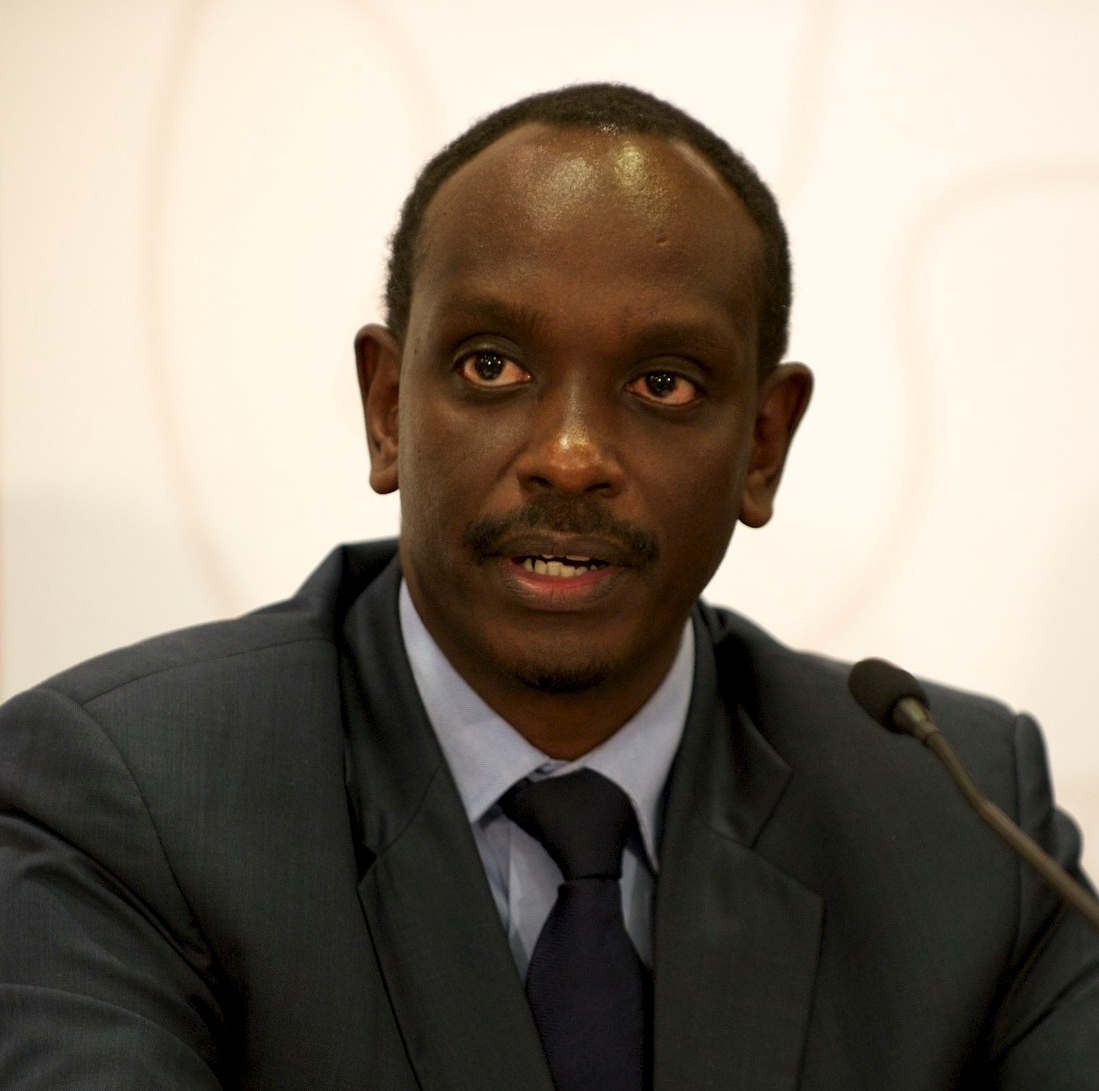

4th Secretary General of the East African Community
- In office 19 April 2011 – 26 April 2016
- Preceded by: Juma Mwapachu
- Succeeded by: Libérat Mfumukeko

Minister of Foreign Affairs
- In office 18 October 2018 – 4 November 2019
- President: Paul Kagame
- Preceded by: Louise Mushikiwabo
- Succeeded by: Vincent Biruta

Minister of Health
- In office 27 October 2008 – 19 April 2011
- President: Paul Kagame

Personal details
- Born: 5 June 1964 (age 62) Kigali, Rwanda
- Spouse: Eustochie Sezibera
- Children: 5
- Education: Makerere University(MBChB); Georgetown University (MA)
- Profession: Physician

Richard Sezibera (born June 5, 1964, in Kigali, Rwanda) is a Rwandan medical doctor, diplomat and politician, who served as the Minister of Foreign Affairs from 18 October 2018 until November 4, 2019. He replaced Louise Mushikiwabo. He was replaced by Vincent Biruta on November 4, 2019.

Previously, he was the 4th Secretary General of the East African Community. He was appointed to that position by the East African Community Heads of State on 19 April 2011 for a five-year term. His term ended on 26 April 2016, when Libérat Mfumukeko of Burundi, became the 5th Secretary General of the East African Community.

== Early life and education ==
Sezibera was born on 5 June 1964, in Kigali, Rwanda. Sezibera received his early education in Burundi. Sezibera went to Namutamba Demonstration School in the current Mityana Municipality. He then joined St. Mary's College Kisubi. In 1984, he entered Makerere University Medical School in Kampala, Uganda, graduating with the degree of Bachelor of Medicine and Bachelor of Surgery (MBChB) in 1989. Later, he obtained a Master of Arts (MA) degree in Liberal Studies from Georgetown University in the United States.

== Career ==
Following his graduation at Makerere University, he worked at Mbuya Hospital in Kampala, Uganda, before transferring to Mbale Regional Referral Hospital in Mbale, Eastern Uganda, where he worked in the Department of Obstetrics and Gynecology.

In 1990, he joined the Rwanda Patriotic Front / Rwanda Patriotic Army (RPF/RPA) as a field medical officer. He rose to the rank of Major within the RPA in 1993.

In July 1994, Sezibera was appointed Physician to the President of the Republic of Rwanda. In this position, he concurrently served as military aide to the President of Rwanda.

In 1995, he became a Member of Parliament. He was elected President of the Parliamentary Commission on Social Affairs, which exercised oversight over the government departments mandated to deal with issues of health.

In 1999, he was appointed Ambassador of Rwanda to the United States of America, with concurrent accreditation to Mexico, Argentina and Brazil.

He served in the Office of the President of Rwanda, as Special Envoy to the African Great Lakes Region and senior advisor to the President of Rwanda. Was also the chairperson of the Rwanda national coordination mechanism. He contributed to the first ever pact on security, stability, and development in the African Great Lakes region. He was also the chairperson of the Rwanda committee in regional integration, a high level committee that led Rwanda technical negotiations for accession to the East Africa Community. In 2008, Dr. Sezibera was appointed Minister of Health in the Rwandan cabinet, a position he held until 2011.

In 2011: he was appointed East African Community Secretary General, by the Head of States summit held in Dar es Salaam on April 19, 2011. During his tenure, among the many things he did as EAC SG, he was the chairperson of the COMESA – SADC – EAC tripartite task force where he spearheaded the negotiations of the tripartite free trade area agreement (TFTA). The TFTA was signed by the Heads of State and Heads of Government in 2015.

On a professional level, Sezibera is a member of the Rwanda Medical Association and a Fellow of the Institute for advanced studies in the humanities at the University of Edinburgh, Scotland. He served as Vice President of the World Health General Assembly and chairperson of the World Health Organization regional committee on Africa. He served as a commissioner on the UN Secretary General's Commission on accountability for women and children's health. He is a member of GAVI (Global Alliance for Vaccine) board first as minister of health in Rwanda, 2nd and 3rd time as an individual. He serves as the chairperson of the board's programme and policy committee.

== Family ==
Sezibera is married to Eustochie Agasaro Sezibera. Together, they have five children.

== See also ==
- Cabinet of Rwanda
- East African Community

Diplomatic posts
Preceded by Juma Mwapachu	Secretary General of the East African Community; 19 April 2011 – 26 April 2016	Succeeded by Libérat Mfumukeko
