= Battle of Bali Strait =

1946 battle in Indonesia

- Part of Indonesian National Revolution
Date	5 April 1946
Location	Bali Strait, Indonesia
Result	Indonesian victory

Belligerents
Indonesia	Netherlands

Commanders and leaders
Captain Markadi	Unknown

Units involved
Indonesian Navy: M–troops; Civilians volunteer	Royal Netherlands Navy

Strength
2 small ships	2 LCM

Casualties and losses
1 Soldier killed 2 Civilians volunteer missing	4 killed 1 LCM sunk 1 LCM burned

The Battle of Bali Strait (also referred to as the Banyuwangi-Bali Operation Strait) marked the first amphibious battle conducted by the Indonesian Navy in the Bali Strait. Fought on 5 April 1946, the engagement pitted the early Indonesian Navy against the much better equipped Dutch Royal Navy. The battle concluded with a significant victory for the Indonesian forces, cementing its place in the history of Indonesia's struggle for independence.

== Background ==
Dutch and Allied forces arrived in Indonesia on March 2, 1946, with the objective of reclaiming control over Java. Before advancing to Java, they landed on smaller islands, including Bali and the Lesser Sunda Islands. The Dutch rapidly established their presence in these areas, deploying additional troops to strengthen their occupation, eventually amassing a force of 2,000 soldiers in Bali. This escalating threat prompted urgent action from the main base of the Indonesian military in Yogyakarta. Orders were issued to initiate operations in Java and Bali to safeguard Indonesia's independence from colonial forces. To execute these operations, three key units were mobilized: the M Force under the command of Captain Markadi, Captain Albert Warokka's forces in Banyuwangi, and the Indonesian troops in Bali led by Lieutenant Colonel I Gusti Ngurah Rai. Of these units, Captain Markadi's forces were chosen to lead the operation. Markadi strategically divided his forces into four divisions, assigning three divisions to engage in direct combat and one division to focus on intelligence gathering.

== Battle ==
Once the forces were prepared, they launched the operation and attempted to break through the Dutch naval blockade. However, heavy rain hindered their movements, making it difficult to launch an effective assault. During this mission, two Indonesian ships narrowly avoided detection by the Dutch Navy. To evade suspicion, Captain Markadi ordered his crew to disguise themselves as fishermen, a tactic meant to distract the Dutch. As a Dutch Landing Craft Mechanized (LCM) approached their ships, Markadi resorted to a bold strategy: he submerged himself in the water armed with grenades. The Dutch responded with machine gun fire, but their weapons proved ineffective against the Indonesian ships. Taking advantage of this, Markadi and his forces hurled grenades at the Dutch LCM, setting it ablaze and causing significant damage. The battle resulted in light casualties for the Indonesian forces, while the Dutch suffered four fatalities, with their LCMs burned. Following this encounter, Markadi and his troops joined forces with Lieutenant Colonel I Gusti Ngurah Rai's unit in Bali. Their arrival was met with a warm and enthusiastic reception from both local civilians and soldiers.
