= Francis Muthaura =

Kenyan politician

Ambassador Dr. Francis Kirimi Muthaura
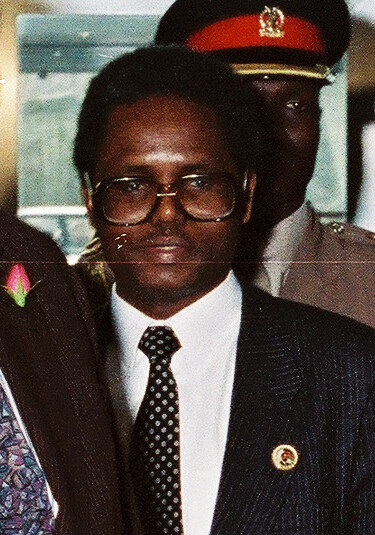

Chairman of the Kenya Revenue Authority
- Incumbent
- Assumed office May 2018

1st Secretary General of the East African Community^{1}
- In office July 2000 – 2001
- Preceded by: None
- Succeeded by: Amanya Mushega

Personal details
- Born: 20 October 1946 (age 79) Meru, Kenya
- Education: University of Nairobi
- Occupation: Retired
- Profession: civil servant
- He was the Executive Secretary of the Secretariat of the Commission for East African Co-operation from 1996.

Francis Kirimi Muthaura (born 20 October 1946 in Meru, Kenya) is a Kenyan former civil servant and distinguished diplomat. He is a former Permanent Secretary and former Head of Civil Service and Secretary to the Cabinet who served during 3rd President Mwai Kibaki's Government from 2003 to 2012.

== Education ==
He attended Nkubu Secondary School from 1966. In 1968, he joined Nyeri High School. He attended the University of Nairobi from 1969 to 1972 and graduated with a Bachelor of Arts (BA) degree in Economics and Political Science. He also has a Diploma in International Relations, also from the University of Nairobi.

== Civil and Public Service career ==
Muthaura has had a long, distinguished career in the Civil and Public Service to the Nation. In his five decades of public service, he served under the five post-colonial regimes of Mzee Jomo Kenyatta, Daniel arap Moi, Mwai Kibaki, Uhuru Kenyatta and William Ruto. After leaving the University of Nairobi in 1972, he was appointed the District Commissioner of Mombasa District, a position he held until 1973.

He was then appointed an Assistant Secretary in the Ministry of Foreign Affairs where he rose through the ranks to be appointed as an Ambassador by Kenya's 2nd President Daniel arap Moi. He served at Kenya's diplomatic Mission in New York and Brussels, worked as Under Secretary and Head of Economic division in the Ministry of Foreign Affairs while also being Kenya's Ambassador to Belgium, Luxemburg and the European Community. At the UN office in New York, he worked as Kenya's Permanent Representative. He went on to serve his country in other capacities such as two stints as Permanent Secretary in the Ministry of Transport and Communication and Ministry of Environment and Natural Resources. From 14 March 1996 to 24 April 2001 he was the Secretary General of the East African Community.

Following the 2002 General Elections where Mwai Kibaki became Kenya's 3rd president, he was initially appointed Permanent Secretary, Ministry of Provincial Administration and Internal Security (present day Ministry of Interior and National Administration) before being elevated to the position of Head of Civil Service and Secretary to the Cabinet, replacing another career diplomat who served under Moi, Dr. Sally Kosgei.

== 2007 General Elections crisis, the International Criminal Court(ICC), and Grand Coalition Government Formation ==
In March 2008, following an agreement between the government and opposition to establish a coalition government to end the widely disputed 2007 General elections crisis that led to a dark period in Kenya's history of Post election Violence (PEV) political crisis, Muthaura stirred controversy by saying that Kibaki would remain both Head of State and Head of Government. This interpretation of the agreement would mean less power than the Orange Democratic Movement (ODM) had anticipated for its leader, Raila Odinga, who was expected to become Prime Minister under the deal; the ODM angrily rejected Muthaura's interpretation. Muthaura would remain as Head of Public Service and Secretary to the Cabinet under the Grand Coalition Government of President Mwai Kibaki and 2nd Kenyan Prime Minister Raila Odinga until 2011.

In 2011, Muthaura was named as an instigator of post-election violence in 2007 – 2008 and was named among six suspects to be prosecuted by the International Criminal Court. He was accused of leading secret meetings in Kibaki's office, where revenge attacks against supporters of Kibaki's opposition were planned. The ICC prosecutor claimed he authorised the use of excessive force against protesters by the police. He was taped by two people posing as students, who claimed he had admitted involvement in post-election violence.

On 11 March 2013, the charges against Muthaura were dropped by the ICC following the lack of clear evidence of his involvement and discrediting of a key witness.

== Post Civil and Public Service Life ==
He was appointed the chairman of the board of the Kenyan Revenue Authority by President Uhuru Kenyatta on 25 May 2018 and exited in November 2022 following the election of President William Ruto who replaced him with Anthony Ng'ang'a Mwaura for a period of three years.

He is currently the 6th Chancellor for Kenyatta University, having been installed in June 2024. Amb. (Dr.) Muthaura has significantly contributed to the education sector and the nation at large. He played a pivotal role in expanding secondary school education enrolment through the development of the Day Secondary School Policy. He also facilitated the expansion of public universities from six to twenty-two, ensuring equitable distribution across all regions of Kenya. His efforts in formulating the TVET Policy led to the creation of technical institutions in all constituencies, empowering the youth with employment opportunities.

Ambassador (Dr.) Muthaura also is the long-serving chair of the Ambassador Francis K. Muthaura Foundation, which is a Charitable Trust established in 2014. The Foundation was established for the purpose of promoting Advanced Education for young needy Kenyans by awarding Masters & PHD Scholarships. Secondly, to support public dialogue, research and publications in the related areas.

== Publications ==
A Moving Horizon: A Memoir Book by Francis K. Muthaura - A Moving Horizon is the life journey of Amb. Dr. Muthaura, spanning from his childhood on the slopes of Mt. Kenya to his retirement from public service. The book follows his career.

https://kibangabooks.com/product/a-moving-horizon-book-by-francis-muthaura/

== Succession table ==
Diplomatic posts
Preceded by None	Secretary General of the East African Community; March 1996 – March 2001	Succeeded by Amanya Mushega
