= Amanya Mushega =

Ugandan Politician and Lawyer

2nd Secretary General of the East African Community
- In office April 2001 – April 2006
- Preceded by: Francis Muthaura
- Succeeded by: Juma Mwapachu

Personal details
- Born: 27 June 1946 (age 80) Bushenyi, Uganda
- Education: UDSM (LL.B); Queen's University (LL.M)
- Profession: Lawyer

Nuwe Amanya Mushega, commonly known as Amanya Mushega, is a Ugandan lawyer, politician, diplomat, and civil servant. He served as the secretary general of the East African Community (EAC) from 2001 until 2006.

== Background ==
He was born on 28 June 1946 in Bushenyi District in the Western Region of Uganda.

== Education ==
Mushega received his early education in Uganda. He attended Mbarara High School from 1963 until 1966, before transferring to Kings College Budo in 1967. He entered the University of Dar es Salaam in 1969 to study law. He obtained his Bachelor of Laws in 1972 and went on to obtain his Master of Laws from Queen's University in Kingston, Ontario, Canada in 1974. In the late 1970s, Mushega enrolled in the Doctor of Philosophy program at the London School of Economics but abandoned that program when he joined the National Resistance Movement in 1981.

== Work experience ==
Following his graduation from the University of Dar es Salaam, he returned to Uganda in 1972 and taught as an assistant lecturer in the faculty of law at Makerere University. After obtaining his master's degree in 1974, he became a lecturer in the faculty of law at the University of Zambia in Lusaka. He returned to Makerere University in 1979 as a lecturer and continued in that capacity until 1981.

In 1981, Mushega joined the National Resistance Army of Yoweri Museveni, where he served as the chief national political commissar and rose to the rank of colonel. Between 1986 and 2001, he served in various ministerial roles, in the ministries of defence, local government, education, and public service. During that time, he also served as the member of parliament representing Igara East in Bushenyi District.

In 2001, he was appointed by the EAC heads of state to serve a five-year term as secretary general of the EAC.

== Personal details ==
Following his work in the EAC, Mushega returned to Uganda and, along with others, started Mushega & Associates Consultants, a private consulting firm. Following the constitutional amendment that removed presidential term limits in Uganda in 2005, Mushega, who opposed the amendment, left the National Resistance Movement political party and joined the Forum for Democratic Change (FDC). He currently serves as the FDC regional vice president for western Uganda.

Diplomatic posts
Preceded by Francis Muthaura	Secretary General of the East African Community; April 2001 – 4 April 2006	Succeeded by Juma Mwapachu
