= List of secretaries general of the East African Community =

Secretary-General of the East African Community
- Incumbent; Stephen Mbundi since 7 March 2026
- East African Community; East African Community Secretariat
- Residence: Arusha, Tanzania
- Term length: 5 years
- Inaugural holder: Francis Muthaura
- Formation: July 2000
- Deputy: Deputy Secretary-General
- Website: www.eac.int/about/leadership-team

This is a list of the secretaries-general of the East African Community since the re-established East African Community, after the EAC Treaty 1999 came into force in July 2000. Since then there have been five secretaries-general appointed by the relevant heads of state. Both the secretary-general position and the chairman position is appointed on a rotational basis by the respective partner states. The secretary-general has to be a deputy secretary-general to be appointed and at a time, there are four deputy secretaries in place.

== List of secretaries-general ==
President			Nationality	Term of office		
№	Portrait	Name (Birth–Death)	Nationality	Took office	Left office	Duration
1		Francis Muthaura (1946–)	Kenya	July 2000	5 April 2001	9 Months
2		Amanya Mushega (1946–)	Uganda	5 April 2001	4 April 2006	5 years
3		Juma Mwapachu (1942–2025)	Tanzania	4 April 2006	19 April 2011	5 years
4		Richard Sezibera (1964–)	Rwanda	19 April 2011	2 March 2016	5 years
5		Libérat Mfumukeko (1964–)	Burundi	2 March 2016	2 March 2021	5 years, 0 days
6		Peter Mathuki (1969–)	Kenya	2 March 2021	7 June 2024	3 years, 97 days
7		Veronica Nduva (1969–)	Kenya	7 June 2024	7 March 2026	2 years, 92 days
8		Stephen Mbundi	Tanzania	7 March 2026		184 days

== Deputy secretary-general ==
A deputy secretary-general is appointed by the summit on a three-year term renewable once. Each nation will have one deputy secretary-general except the nation at which the secretary-general hails from.

== See also ==
- East African Community
