= Juma Mwapachu =

Tanzanian politician (1942–2025)

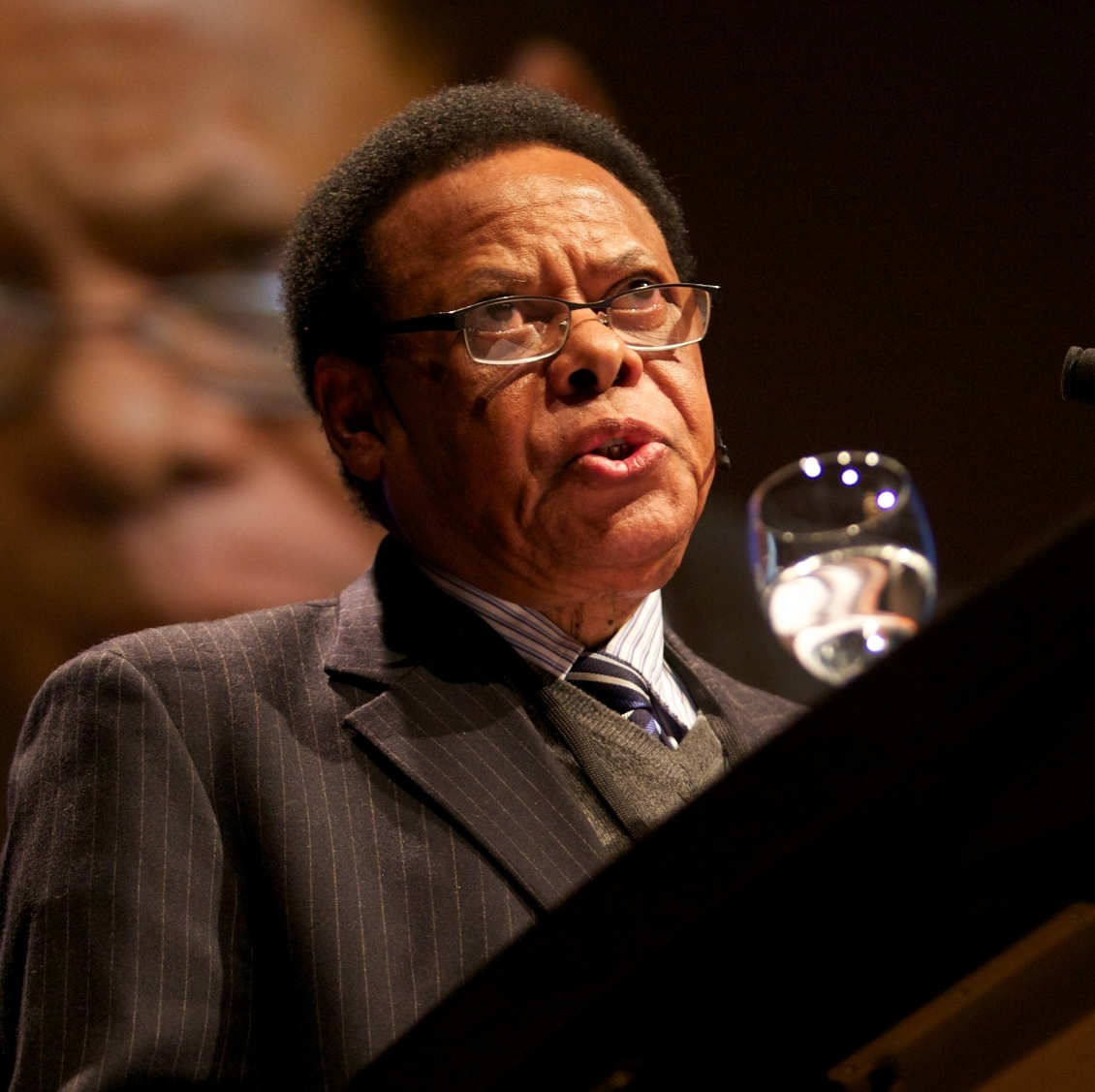
- Mwapachu in 2012

3rd Secretary General of the East African Community
- In office 4 April 2006 – 19 April 2011
- Preceded by: Amanya Mushega
- Succeeded by: Richard Sezibera

Personal details
- Born: 27 September 1942 Mwanza, Tanganyika Territory
- Died: 28 March 2025 (aged 82) Dar es Salaam, Tanzania
- Party: Chama Cha Mapinduzi (1977–2025)
- Education: UDSM (LL. B); Indian Academy of International Law and Diplomacy (PGDip)

Juma Volter Mwapachu (27 September 1942 – 28 March 2025) was a Tanzanian politician who served as Secretary General of the East African Community. He replaced Amanya Mushega of Uganda who completed his five-year term on 24 March 2006.

== Background ==
Mwapachu was born on 27 September 1942. He was nominated for the post by Tanzanian President Jakaya Mrisho Kikwete. He was elected as Secretary General of the East African Community by the Summit of EAC Heads of State on 4 April 2006. Prior to this appointment, Mwapachu was Ambassador Extraordinary and Plenipotentiary and Tanzania's permanent delegate to UNESCO.

Mwapachu was a law graduate of the University of Dar es Salaam (degree obtained in 1969.) He also held a Postgraduate Diploma in International Law, International Institutions and Diplomacy from the Indian Academy of International Law and Diplomacy, New Delhi, India. The University of Dar es Salaam conferred on him a Doctor of Literature degree (Honoris Causa) in 2005. He died on 28 March 2025, aged 82.

Some of his posts prior to his appointment as the Secretary General of the EAC were:

- Working with the Ministry of Local Government and Regional Administration in the 1970s.
- Tanzania’s High Commissioner in New Delhi, India.
- Chairman of the Board of Directors of the Tanzania Railways Corporation.
- A commissioner of the Presidential Parastatal Sector Reform Commission.
- The Chairman of the Confederation of Tanzania Industries among others.
- Member of the Governing Council, Society for International Development.

Mwapachu died in Dar es Salaam, Tanzania on 28 March 2025, at the age of 82.

== Works ==
- Confronting New Realities: Reflections on Tanzania’s Radical Transformation
- Management of Public Enterprises in Developing Countries
- Local Perspectives on Globalization; The African Case (co-written with J. Semboja, E. Jansen)
- President of the Society for International Development

Diplomatic posts
Preceded by Amanya Mushega	Secretary General of the East African Community; 4 April 2006 – 19 April 2011	Succeeded by Richard Sezibera
