= 18th EAC Ordinary summit =

18th EAC Ordinary summit The 18th Ordinary summit of Heads of State of The East African Community
- Host country: Tanzania
- Date: 20 May 2017
- Cities: Dar-es-salaam
- Venues: State House
- Participants: Burundi; Kenya; Rwanda; South Sudan; Tanzania; Uganda
- Follows: 17th EAC Extra Ordinary summit
- Precedes: 19th EAC Ordinary summit

The 18th EAC Ordinary summit was held on 20 May 2017 in Dar es Salaam, Tanzania. The focus of the summit was the European Union and East African Community Economic Partnership agreement. Also on the agenda of the meeting was the status of the EAC political federation and the speedy integration of South Sudan. The leadership of the community was also transferred from John Magufuli of Tanzania to Yoweri Museveni of Uganda. The Burundian crisis was significantly neglected during the summit, however, Yoweri Museveni the new chairman of the member bloc vowed to quickly find a solution to the crisis.

== Participants ==
Country	Title	Dignitary
Burundi	Vice President	Gaston Sindimwo
Kenya	Deputy-President	William Ruto
Rwanda	Minister of Trade and East African Affairs	François Kanimba
Uganda	President	Yoweri Museveni
Tanzania	President	John Magufuli
Observing Participants
South Sudan	Special envoy	Aggery Sabuni

== Agenda ==
=== Economic Partnership Agreement ===
The key agenda of the meeting was the EU-EAC Economic partnership agreement. Museveni reiterated that countries such as Kenya and Rwanda that have signed the agreement should not be penalized by the European Union and the countries that have not signed the agreement can not sign the agreement pending various clarifications from the EU. Museveni agreed to lead a delegation of the bloc economic members to Europe to solve various disagreements.

=== Burundi ===
The Burundian unrest was discussed as one of the problems during the tenure of John Magufuli and that not much progress has been made to resolve the issue. The summit was not attended by Pierre Nkurunziza, president of Burundi. The delay in the resolution was attributed to the lack of motivation between the disputed parties to negotiate a settlement. Furthermore, the leaders iterated the EU to lift sanctions on Burundi.

=== Somalia ===
The leaders read the report on the admission criteria of Somalia into the East African community. Various local leaders warned against the admission of the war torn country until the country can fix its security issues.
