= 19th EAC Ordinary summit =

19th EAC Ordinary summit The 19th Ordinary summit of Heads of State of The East African Community
- Host country: Uganda
- Date: 23 February 2018
- Cities: Kampala
- Venues: Speke Resort, Munyonyo
- Participants: Burundi; Kenya; Rwanda; South Sudan; Tanzania; Uganda
- Follows: 18th EAC Ordinary summit
- Precedes: 20th EAC Ordinary summit

The 19th EAC Ordinary summit was held on 23 February 2018 in Kampala, Uganda. The focus of the summit was deepen regional integration through infrastructure development and financing for health. on the agenda of the meeting was the status of the EAC political federation and the speedy integration of South Sudan.

== Participants ==
Country	Title	Dignitary
Burundi	Vice President	Gaston Sindimwo
Kenya	President	Uhuru Kenyatta
Rwanda	Minister of Trade and East African Affairs	James Musoni
South Sudan	President	Salva Kiir
Uganda	President	Yoweri Museveni
Tanzania	President	John Magufuli

== Agenda ==
=== Manufacturing ===
Various sectors of development were discussed as a sector of growth such as Textile, Apparel and Agro-processing. A major focus for boosting regional manufacturing, the heads of states directed the EAC council to work on the process to harmonize the automotive industry regulations in the region. The leaders are looking to help reduce the importation of used vehicles and in turn grow the local vehicle assembly and manufacturing businesses.

=== Economic Partnership Agreement ===
The European Economic Partnership agreement continues to be and important trade agreement that is still pending partner state approval. Museveni continued to reiterate that he is engaging with EU officials to ensure that a satisfactory agreement is agreed upon soon. Kenya & Rwanda are still the only members to sign the EU-EAC EPA.

=== New members ===
The council continued to guide the body to fast track the integration of South Sudan into the trade bloc. Political issues and funding has stagnated the process of integrating the new member into the block. Moreover, the EAC council had not as discussed the report that was presented at 18th EAC Ordinary summit to analyze the admission criteria for Somalia. The council aimed to discuss this at the next summit.
