= Peter Mathuki =

Former Secretary-General of the East African Community

Dr. Peter Mutuku Mathuki
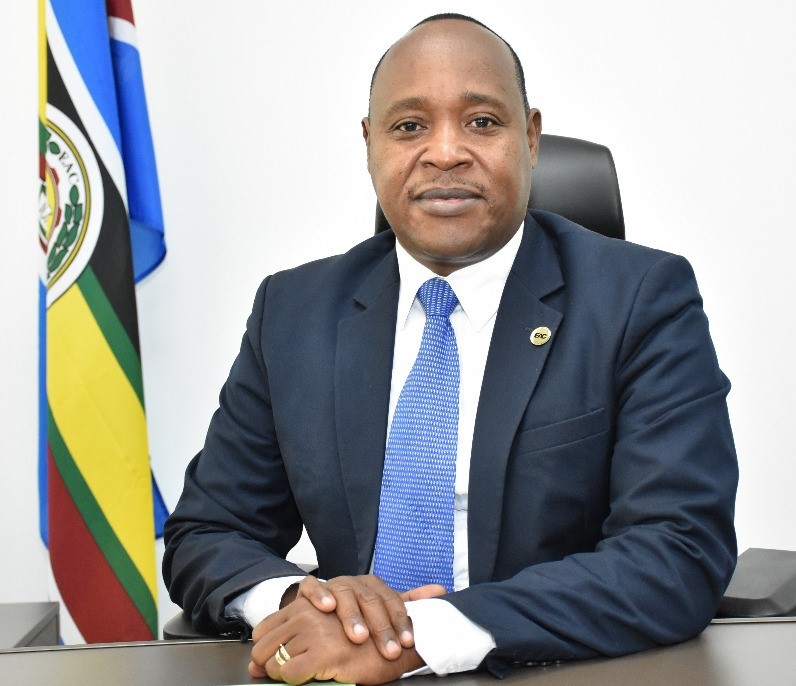

Ambassador of Kenya to Russia
- Incumbent
- Assumed office May 2024
- Appointed by: William Ruto

6th Secretary General of the East African Community
- In office 25 April 2021 – 7 June 2024
- Preceded by: Libérat Mfumukeko
- Succeeded by: Veronica Nduva

Member of the East African Legislative Assembly
- In office 12 June 2012 – 12 June 2017

Personal details
- Born: Peter Mutuku Mathuki; February 20, 1969 (age 57) Kenya
- Spouse: Teresia Mutuku
- Children: 3
- Education: MBA, Ph.D University of Nairobi
- Profession: Diplomat

Peter Mutuku Mathuki (born 20 February 1969) is a Kenyan diplomat, private sector development expert, and Secretary-General of the East African Community until his embezzlement of EAC funds was publicized. Since his recall, he has served as Ambassador of Kenya to Russia. He previously served an MP in the East African Legislative Assembly between 2012 and 2017, and the CEO of the East African Business Council from 2018 to 2021. He is currently under investigation for corruption.

== Background and education ==
Mathuki holds a Master of Business Administration (MBA), and a Doctor of Philosophy (PhD) in Strategic Management and Regional Integration from the University of Nairobi.

== Career ==
Mathuki was the Director in charge of International Labour Standards at the International Confederation of Free Trade Unions between 2004 and 2008. He worked at the European Union programs for Africa based in Asmara, Eritrea from 2010 to 2012.

=== EAC ===
Between 2012 and 2017, Mathuki served as the Member of Parliament of the East African Legislative Assembly where he chaired the EALA Committee responsible for good governance and served on the Committee of Trade and Investment.

Following his term in Parliament, he served as the executive director of the East African Business Council between 2018 and 2021. Here he advocated the voice of the private sector in East African Community decision-making processes and advocating for a conducive business environment for increased trade and investment in the bloc.

Mathuki was recommended by Kenyan president Uhuru Kenyatta for the position of Secretary-General of the East African Community, following the tenure of former EAC Secretary-General Libérat Mfumukeko. Mathuki was appointed to the position by the East African Community Heads of State on 27 February 2021. He assumed office on 25 April 2021, with his term set to end in 2026.

As Secretary-General, Mathuki played a pivotal role in overseeing the coming into effect of the African Continental Free Trade Area and championed the formation of the African Business Council to reposition the EAC bloc to reap the benefits availed by the continental market. Under his stewardship, the EAC saw the accession of the Democratic Republic of the Congo and Somalia to the community, expanding the population of the EAC from 184 million to 340 million. He was also instrumental in the creation of several regional platforms, which were critical in the negotiation of the EAC Common Market Protocol such as the East African Employers Association and the East African Trade Union Confederation. He also oversaw the deployment of East African Regional Forces to the Democratic Republic of the Congo to fight the March 23 Rebel Group, before their exit from the country in December 2023 following DRC President Félix Tshisekedi's inaction in renewing the contract.

In May 2024, Mathuki was appointed as the Kenyan Ambassador to Russia and therefore leaving his role as the Secretary-General of the East African Community. Veronica Nduva was sworn in on 7 June 2024, as the replacement by the Kenyan President to complete his term.

=== Embezzlement ===
In March 2024, an impeachment campaign was started in the EALA for the impeachment of Mathuki due to six million dollars in missing funds from the EAC Secretariat's Peace Fund. The allegations came from four whistleblowers close to his office who complained to one EALA MP. EALA Finance Subcommittee Chairperson Denis Namara broached the allegations at a EALA Plenary Session on 5 March 2024, following a speech from Kenyan President William Ruto, beginning the process of impeachment. However, on 8 March 2024, Mathuki was recalled by Ruto, sidestepping the impeachment which would have reflected negatively on Kenya. He was the first EAC Secretary-General to be recalled. Ruto appointed Mathuki to Ambassador of Kenya to Russia, which the Kenyan National Assembly confirmed soon thereafter. On May 14, 2024, the EALA announced that it will investigate Mathuki for corruption and abuse of office, with charges including fabricated travel expenses and favoritism in hiring of staff and consultants. On 7 June 2024, he was officially replaced as EAC Secretary-General by Veronica Nduva.

== Other considerations ==
He sits on several boards including the Kenya Investment Authority, Inter-University Council for East Africa, Uganda and Centre of Excellence for ICT in East Africa, Tanzania and the Civil Aviation Safety and Security Oversight Agency among others. He is also a member of the Kenya Institute of Management.^{[outdated]}

Diplomatic posts
Preceded by Libérat Mfumukeko	Secretary General of the East African Community; 25 April 2021 - 7 June 2024	Succeeded by Veronica Nduva
