= Libérat Mfumukeko =

Burundian diplomat and civil servant

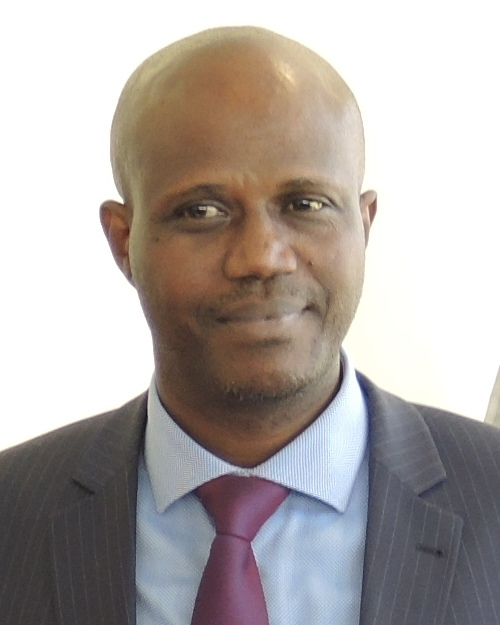

5th Secretary General of the East African Community
- In office 2 March 2016 – 25 April 2021
- Preceded by: Richard Sezibera
- Succeeded by: Peter Mathuki

Deputy Secretary General East African Community
- In office 26 April 2015 – 2 March 2016
- President: Pierre Nkurunziza

Personal details
- Born: Burundi
- Education: Clark University, & Harvard University in United States, University of Tours in France, Lomonossov Moscow State University in Russia
- Profession: Diplomat

Libérat Mfumukeko is a Burundian diplomat and civil servant. He is currently an IDA / World Bank Borrowers’ Representative where he co-chairs the Africa Group 1 (22 countries), and is also a Chargé de Mission at the Office of the President of the Republic of Burundi.

From 2016 to 2021, he was the Secretary General of the East African Community (EAC). During his term at EAC, he presided over the Tripartite EAC-COMESA-SADC in 2016-2017, served as an ex-officio member of the East African Legislative Assembly (EALA) and of the African Union Executive Council.

Before 2016, Mfumukeko was the EAC Deputy Secretary in charge of Finance and Administration. From 2009 to 2015, he held high-profile positions in Burundi; he was the first Director General of the Burundi Investment Promotion Agency (2009-2012), the Principal Advisor (with a Ministerial rank) to the President of the Republic of Burundi in charge of Economic Affairs (2012-2013), and the Director General of REGIDESO (2013-2015), the largest state-owned company in Burundi which main activities are production and distribution of water and electricity.

Between 1994 and 2009, Mfumukeko held various managerial positions in the private sector in France and the USA where he studied and lived for more than 20 years, and he was an Economic Expert at the United Nations (UNDP and FAO) for 5 years.

Mfumukeko holds a Bachelor Degree in Economics from the University of Tours (France), an MBA from Clark University (MA, USA), a Post-graduate Certificate in Adaptive Leadership from the Kennedy School of Government (Harvard University, USA), and a Diploma in Russian Language from the Lomonossov Moscow State University (Russia). In 2021, Clark University granted him a Doctoral Degree Honoris Causa. Since 2013, Amb. Libérat Mfumukeko has been the founder and president of the NGO “Excellence in Education for Development” which operates Bujumbura International University.

== Education ==
Amb. Mfumukeko has a Bachelor’s degree in Economics from the University of Tours (France), an MBA from Clark University (Massachusetts, USA) and a postgraduate Executive degree in Leadership from the Kennedy School of Government at Harvard University (MA, USA). In 2021 Clark University awarded him a Doctoral degree honoris causa in Humane Letters. Amb. Mfumukeko also has a diploma from the Lomonossov Moscow State University (Russia) where he spent one academic year to learn the Russian language.

== Career ==
At the time of his appointment in 2016 as EAC Secretary General, Amb. Mfumukeko was the Deputy Secretary General responsible for finance and administration at the EAC headquarters in Arusha, Tanzania. Prior to that, he served in several high profile positions including: Principal Adviser to the President of Burundi in charge of Economic Affairs, Director General of REGIDESO (Burundi's energy and water utility), Chairman of the Steering Committee of the East African Power Pool (EAPP), Director General of API (Burundi Investment Promotion Authority), and Economic Expert at the Food and Agriculture Organization of the United Nations (FAO). He also worked for large companies in Europe and the USA where he spent more than 20 years.

== Personal ==
According to the EAC Secretariat, Amb. Mfumukeko is fluent in English, French, Kirundi, Kiswahili and Russian. He has a long international experience, having worked and/or lived in DR Congo, Rwanda, France, USA, Ivory Coast, Cameroun, and Russia.

Diplomatic posts
Preceded by Richard Sezibera	Secretary General of the East African Community; 26 April 2016 - 25 April 2021	Succeeded by Peter Mathuki
