= I Gusti Ngurah Rai =

Indonesian national hero (1917–1946)

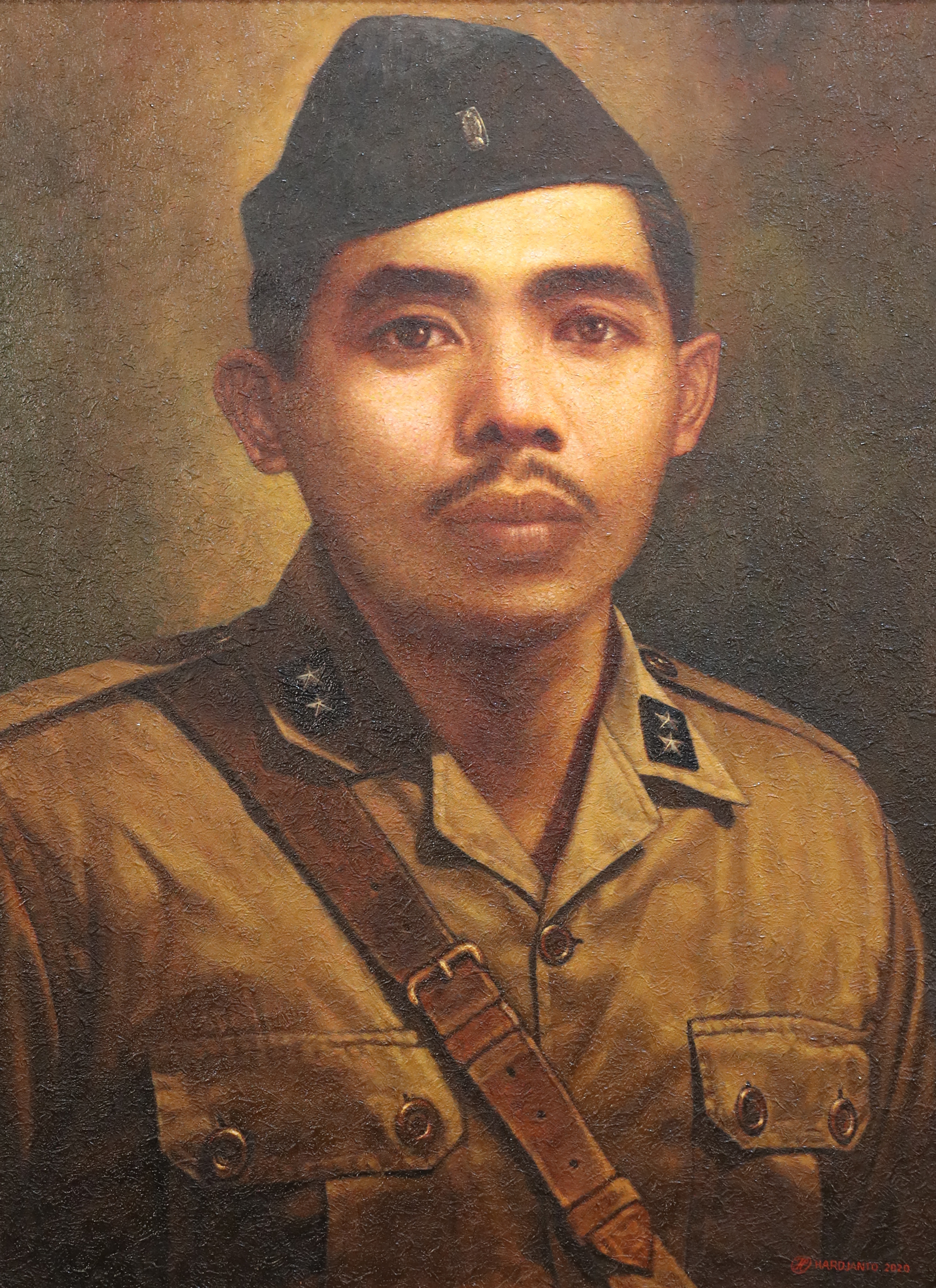
- Born: I Gusti Ngurah Rai; 30 January 1917; Badung Regency, Bali, Dutch East Indies
- Died: 20 November 1946 (aged 29); Marga, Bali, Indonesia
- Military career
- Branch: Indonesian Army
- Service years: 1938–1946
- Rank: Lieutenant Colonel
- Conflicts: Battle of Margarana
- Awards: National Hero of Indonesia

I Gusti Ngurah Rai (Note: In accordance with Balinese naming traditions, "I" in the name denotes male gender, "Gusti" denotes membership of the noble class, "Ngurah" refers specifically to the Balinese ksatria caste, corresponding to the Indian Kshatriya, and only "Rai" is the personal name. In Indonesia, the shortened form of the name usually uses the last two elements, Ngurah Rai, or only the final element, Rai.) (30 January 1917 – 20 November 1946) was an Indonesian military officer and a participant in the Indonesian National Revolution. He was the founder and first commander of the Indonesian National Armed Forces unit in the Lesser Sunda Islands, and the direct leader of armed anti-Dutch resistance in Bali. He was killed in November 1946 in a battle with Dutch troops near the village of Marga in central Bali.

A National Hero of Indonesia, he was posthumously awarded one of the country's highest military honours, the Star of Mahaputera, and promoted to the rank of brigadier general, having died with the rank of lieutenant colonel. He is one of the most revered figures in Bali's modern history. I Gusti Ngurah Rai's name has been given to Denpasar's international airport, the island's largest university and largest stadium, a ship of the Indonesian Navy, streets in many Balinese settlements, and streets in several cities in other parts of Indonesia.

== Early life and education ==
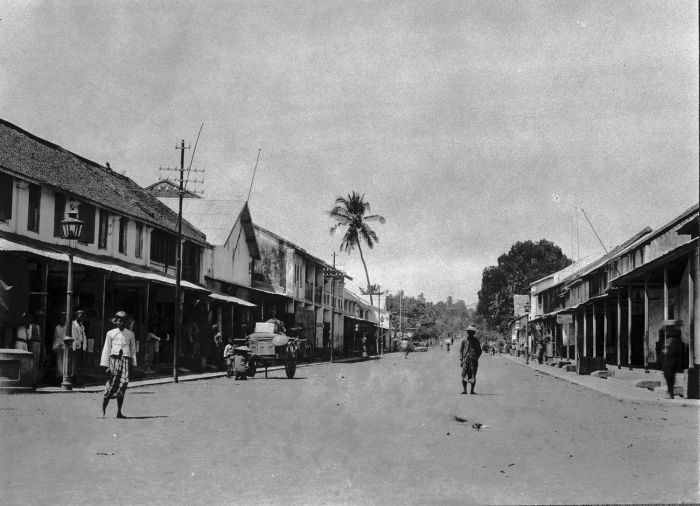
Denpasar during Ngurah Rai's school years

Ngurah Rai was born on 30 January 1917 (Note: In 2016, Wayan Windia, a professor at Denpasar's Udayana University, disputed Ngurah Rai's date of birth on the basis of archival documents and a comparison of various testimonies. According to his version, Ngurah Rai was born six months later, on 19 July 1917.) in the village of Carangsari in Petang district, Badung Regency, southern Bali, into an affluent family of noble origin. He was the second of three sons of I Gusti Ngurah Palung (Indonesian: I Gusti Ngurah Palung) and his wife Ni Gusti Ayu Kompyang. At the time of Rai's birth, his father held the post of head of the Petang district administration.

Relatives and fellow villagers remembered Rai as a sociable and energetic child who enjoyed active games and the local form of the Indonesian martial art silat.

His father's official position and financial means allowed him to be sent to Denpasar to study at a Dutch elementary school for indigenous Indonesians, named HIS Denpasar. He then went to MULO Junior High School in Malang, East Java to continue his education at a Dutch secondary school. However, he did not complete his studies there. After his father's death in 1935, Ngurah Rai had to return to Bali.

After returning home, Ngurah Rai spent more than two years outside formal education and without regular employment, until in 1938 he entered the officer school of the Prajoda Corps, a paramilitary formation that had been established by the Dutch colonial administration in Bali shortly before, in 1936. Prajoda was not part of the Royal Netherlands East Indies Army (KNIL), and had the status of an auxiliary battalion-level unit responsible for maintaining order on the island and providing guards of honour during various official and ceremonial events. Its rank-and-file and non-commissioned personnel were recruited from the local population, mainly young men from aristocratic Balinese families; Dutch military personnel were appointed to senior officer posts, while junior officer posts were filled on a mixed basis.

At the Military Cadet School, which was located in Gianyar Regency in the south-eastern part of the island, Rai distinguished himself through good academic performance and independently studied several additional subjects, including English. Despite his small stature, even by the standards of a Balinese man in the first half of the 20th century; Rai was only 154 centimetres tall, and his weight did not exceed 45 kilograms even in later adulthood, he successfully coped with the physical demands of military training.

After graduating from the school with the rank of second lieutenant in 1940, Rai was sent to short-term officer courses in Magelang. In the same year, he was transferred for accelerated retraining to an artillery school at Corps Opleiding Voor Reserve Officieren (CORO) in Malang, a city already familiar to him from his earlier schooling.

== Activities during the Second World War ==
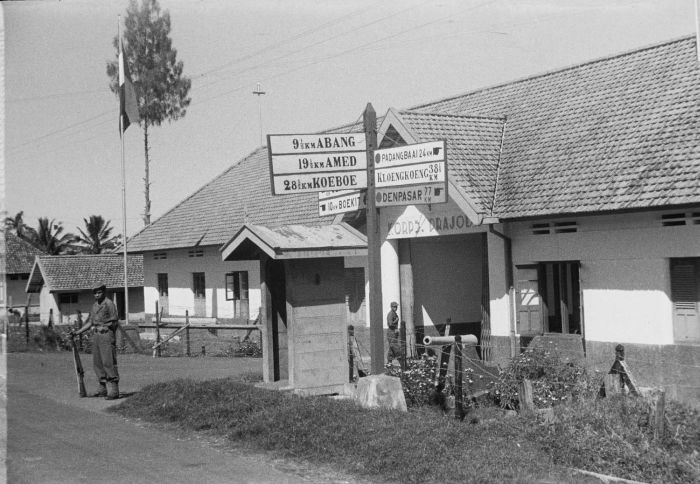
Barracks of the Prajoda Corps in southern Bali

In late 1941, after the outbreak of hostilities in the Pacific theatre, Ngurah Rai was recalled from Malang to serve in Prajoda. By the time of the Japanese invasion of the Dutch East Indies in January 1942, this auxiliary corps, numbering about 600 men, remained the only armed formation stationed on Bali, as there were no regular KNIL units on the island. Formal command of the corps was assigned to major general G. A. Ilgen, commander of the third infantry division of the KNIL, which was responsible for the defence of eastern Java, Bali and Madura. Its actual commander, however, was lieutenant colonel W. P. Roodenburg.

Despite the mobilisation measures that had been taken, Prajoda was unable to offer even minimal resistance to the Japanese, who made a surprise landing on Bali on 19 February 1942. The corps' units avoided contact with the enemy, mass desertion began, and the command's order to destroy the infrastructure of the Denpasar airfield to prevent its use by the enemy was not carried out. Under these circumstances, Roodenburg was forced to withdraw the remaining Prajoda troops from the Japanese landing area and formally disband the corps. The Balinese returned to their homes, while the Dutch officers fled to neighbouring Java, which at that time was still under KNIL control. Ngurah Rai is known to have helped two of his Dutch fellow servicemen cross to Java.

After the establishment of Japanese control over Bali, the island, like the entire Lesser Sunda island chain, was assigned to the occupation zone of the Second Fleet. Like many Indonesians, Ngurah Rai was initially relatively loyal toward the Japanese, associating their invasion, which had interrupted Dutch colonial rule, with the possibility of better development for the country and its political self-determination. He took a position at the Bali branch of the Japanese transport company Mitsui Bussan Kaisha, where he was involved in organising shipments of rice and other goods to Japan.

Over time, however, Ngurah Rai became convinced that the Japanese occupation had only worsened the situation of the Balinese population. By 1944, Rai's attitude toward the occupiers had become highly critical. He joined the anti-Japanese underground resistance that was taking shape in Bali during this period and began cooperating with the intelligence services of the Allies, which maintained a station in the Japanese-occupied Dutch East Indies. Heading an intelligence cell made up mainly of his former Prajoda comrades and subordinates, many of whom also worked at the local branch of Mitsui Bussan Kaisha, Rai supplied the Allies with information on the schedules and cargoes of Japanese transports. At one point, he came under suspicion and was detained by the Tokubetsu Keisatsutai, but was released after three days in custody due to a lack of evidence.

== Alignment with the authorities of the Republic of Indonesia ==
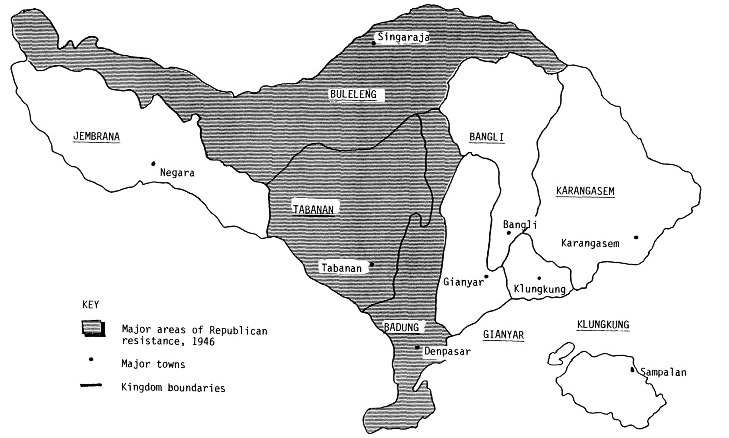
The political divisions among the kingdoms of Bali during the Indonesian National Revolution (1945–1949)

After Japan's emperor officially announced the acceptance of the terms of surrender on 15 August 1945, followed two days later, on 17 August, by the proclamation of the independence of the Republic of Indonesia, spontaneous self-organisation began in Bali among supporters of the sovereignisation of the Dutch East Indies. By the end of August, several political groups had been formed, mainly youth organisations. With the arrival on the island of I Gusti Ketut Pudja, who had been appointed by President Sukarno as governor of the Lesser Sunda Islands province, with its capital in the Balinese city of Singaraja, republican authorities gradually began to take shape there. A significant part of the Balinese feudal nobility adopted a wait-and-see position during this period, fearing the imminent return of the Dutch colonial authorities to the island. Ngurah Rai, however, immediately came out in support of independence. Establishing close cooperation with Ketut Pudja, he began creating military-police forces on the island intended to resist the restoration of Dutch rule.

At the same time, Ngurah Rai warned his supporters, many of whom came from the lower strata of Balinese society, against conflict with the aristocratic elite, believing that any form of class conflict would weaken the country's capacity in the struggle for independence. At the same time, owing to his own background, he retained the ability to communicate with the highest-ranking Balinese, including many rulers of local princely dynasties, and urged them to remain loyal to the republican authorities.

After the creation in October 1945, by decree of President Sukarno, of the People's Security Army (Indonesian: Tentara Keamanan Rakyat, TKR), which became the precursor of the Indonesian National Armed Forces, (Note: In January 1946, the People's Security Army was renamed the Army of the Republic of Indonesia. The change of name reflected the transition from military-police functions to purely military ones.) the militia formed by Ngurah Rai, which by that time consisted of 13 companies, (Note: It is not possible to determine with any precision the size of Rai's militia during this period, since the personnel of many of the "companies" were not properly documented.) was declared by Governor Ketut Pudja to be one of its structural units. Rai himself was unanimously elected commander of the "TKR troops in the Lesser Sunda Islands" at a special meeting attended by the governor, the heads of all major political groups, and representatives of most Balinese princely houses. The headquarters of these troops was established in Denpasar. In November 1945, Ngurah Rai's authority was confirmed by a delegation of the highest republican military command that visited Bali, and he was granted the rank of major in the TKR. To maintain liaison between the provincial and central military structures, an officer from the TKR general staff was attached to Rai, while a representative of Rai was, in turn, sent to the general staff. At the same time, despite the concentration of most armed resources under Rai's command, there remained armed pro-independence groups in Bali that were outside his control, mainly small combat detachments of youth organisations.

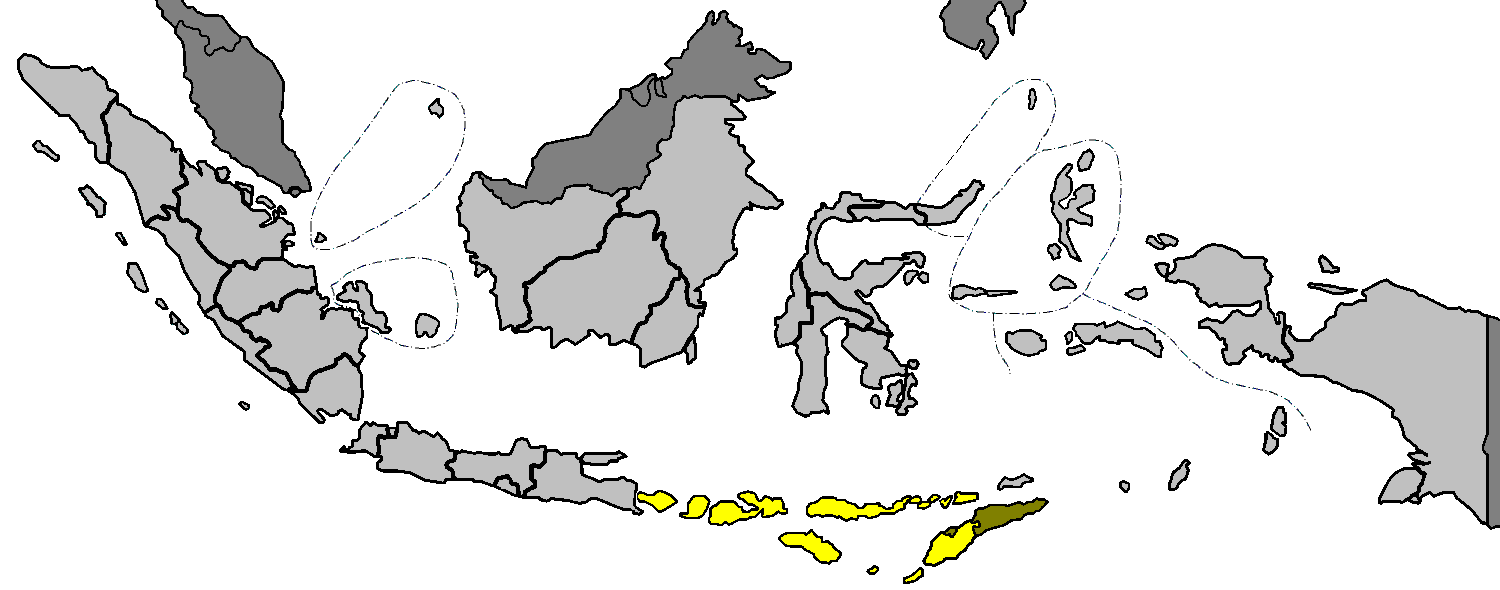
The Indonesian Lesser Sunda Islands, the area of responsibility of Ngurah Rai's armed formations

The troops of capitulated Japan that remained in Bali during this period, whose personnel then numbered 3,136 men, including 1,900 army servicemen and 1,146 sailors, initially did not obstruct the activities of Ngurah Rai and his militia, or those of other representatives of the republican authorities. Moreover, a considerable number of Japanese sympathised with anti-Dutch Balinese. There were cases of Japanese military personnel voluntarily handing over weapons and material assets to local supporters of independence, and even joining the Indonesian republicans with their weapons. Several dozen Japanese are reliably known to have joined the anti-Dutch movement in Bali. In late November 1945, the command of Japanese forces in Bali entered into negotiations with emissaries of Sukarno's government over the transfer of most of its weapons to the latter.

In early December 1945, however, under pressure from the command of the British expeditionary force, which had begun disarming and evacuating Japanese units from Indonesia, the Japanese demanded that Bali's republican leadership return the financial assets that had been expropriated from them. Governor Ketut Pudja regarded this demand as unacceptable and provocative. At the same time, the leadership of local youth groups, aware of the negotiations between representatives of the central authorities and the Japanese, supported the independent confiscation of Japanese weapons so that they would remain in Bali rather than be transported to Java.

On 13 December, a republican detachment attacked the Japanese garrison in Denpasar, but suffered casualties in a brief engagement and was dispersed. Ngurah Rai's role in this event remains a matter of debate. The Canadian historian Geoffrey Robinson, author of a major study of this period in Balinese history, argues that the military operation was carried out on the orders of the republican governor, and that Rai therefore could not have been uninvolved in its preparation. By contrast, the Indonesian journalists Iwan Santosa and Wenri Wanhar, drawing on the recollections of participants in the events, concluded that the attack on the Japanese garrison in Denpasar had been undertaken independently by youth movement activists who were not serving in Ngurah Rai's formation. In any case, after the events of 13 December, the attitude of the Japanese toward the Balinese independence fighters, and toward Rai personally, changed sharply and became openly hostile. They arrested Governor Ketut Pudja and several republican activists, and resumed patrols of the area, which had been suspended after Japan's surrender was announced. Negotiations on the transfer of weapons to the Jakarta emissaries were broken off.

The events in Denpasar convinced Ngurah Rai that armed confrontation with the Japanese was counterproductive. He ordered the militia forces to withdraw from Denpasar and other major settlements in Bali in order to avoid further clashes with the occupation troops. He also succeeded in dissuading one of the Balinese princes from declaring war on the Japanese. Rai urged him, as he did other supporters of independence, to preserve their strength for the struggle against the Dutch, who by that time had already announced their intention to restore their control over the colony. Rai then decided to travel to Java, to the general staff of the People's Security Army in Yogyakarta, in order to request weapons from Indonesia's senior military leadership and seek instructions on further action. Together with a small group of associates who, like him, held officer ranks in the People's Security Army, he left Bali on 1 January 1946.

== Stay in Java ==
By the time Ngurah Rai arrived in Yogyakarta on 13 January 1946, the central Javanese city had been declared the capital of the Republic of Indonesia, as the republican authorities had lost control of Jakarta, where the Dutch colonial administration had been restored with the support of British troops. The leadership of the general staff, and its chief Oerip Soemohardjo personally, highly praised the enthusiasm and fighting spirit of the Balinese officer. In Yogyakarta, Rai was introduced to President Sukarno, who by that time had already heard of his active work. According to eyewitnesses, the Indonesian leader was charmed by the small stature of the commander of the Balinese military formation.

The militia created by Rai was finally integrated into the structure of the national armed forces. On 1 February, it was officially incorporated as a regiment into the VII Division of the Army of the Republic of Indonesia, which was then being formed in East Java. Funding was allocated for the Lesser Sunda Islands Regiment from the national military budget, amounting to 70,000 rupiahs per month, and the autonomous status of this military unit was also specifically provided for. Rai himself was promoted to the rank of lieutenant colonel.

At the same time, Ngurah Rai's request for arms supplies was rejected by the leadership of the general staff, on the grounds that all the weapons and ammunition at its disposal had already been allocated to other military units. A decision was made to send to Bali, in support of Rai's regiment, a fully manned and armed unit from Java. The preparation of this reinforcement was entrusted to the command of the national naval forces, and its core consisted of the naval special unit then being formed, "M Force", under the command of Captain Markadi. Rai himself was instructed to take part in the preparation of this unit, in particular by familiarising its fighters with the specific features of the Balinese theatre of operations. As a result, his stay in Java lasted until early April 1946.

A three-minute documentary film showing the landing of the first Dutch units on Bali on 1 March 1946

Meanwhile, during Rai's trip to Java, the situation in Bali was changing rapidly. As early as January, representatives of the Dutch colonial authorities began arriving on the island accompanied by British military personnel. Under pressure from the British and the pro-Dutch section of the local feudal elite, Governor Ketut Pudja was forced to transfer most of his authority to the Council of Princes, formed on 29 January, almost all of whose members viewed the prospect of the restoration of Dutch colonial rule favourably. In early March 1946, a two-thousand-strong expeditionary force, formed mainly from KNIL servicemen released from Japanese captivity, landed on the island. It was given the name "Red Elephant". Within a week, the colonial administration had been re-established in Bali, and the local republican authorities were deposed.

Initially, relations between the Dutch and supporters of independence in Bali were largely free of conflict. The latter's leaders officially renounced any subversive activity, thereby avoiding persecution by the colonial authorities. Ngurah Rai's regiment, left without its commander, was not formally disbanded, but its units were forced to leave populated areas: the fighters set up camps in the jungle, while some returned to their homes. By mid-March, however, regular clashes had begun to occur on the island between Dutch troops and the local population. Even the commander of the "Red Elephant", Lieutenant Colonel Frederik Hendrik ter Meulen, acknowledged that in most cases the violence was caused by excessive suspicion on the part of the expeditionary corps' personnel and by abuses of authority. In his report to higher command, he noted that in the first week of April alone, corps personnel had killed more than 50 islanders, a considerable number of whom, including a woman and a child, were later found to have had no connection with anti-colonial resistance. Despite a categorical ban by the Allied British-Dutch command on the use of military aviation in Bali and neighbouring Lombok, there were numerous cases in which junior personnel of the "Red Elephant" used B-25 and Piper Cub aircraft on their own initiative to strafe and bomb "suspicious" gatherings of people and villages.

Under these conditions, the leadership of the Indonesian armed forces accelerated preparations for the deployment of units to Bali. By early April, the formation of "M Force" had been completed, and Ngurah Rai was ordered to lead the landing of its advance units. On the night of 4 April, three groups of fighters, numbering about 160 men in total, set out on tugboats and fishing boats from the East Javanese port of Banyuwangi toward Bali. Two groups, including the one directly led by Ngurah Rai, succeeded in landing without obstruction on the north-western coast of Bali the following morning. The third, led by the commander of "M Force", Captain Markadi, was intercepted in the Bali Strait by a Dutch LCM-6 landing craft and engaged it in a battle that entered history as the first naval battle of the Indonesian armed forces. Markadi's group, after suffering losses, also eventually landed on Bali.

In total, during the operation, which lasted several days, 290 fighters from "M Force" were transferred from East Java to Bali. In addition, small groups of servicemen from other units, as well as volunteers from Java, Madura and other parts of Indonesia, landed on the island. According to Dutch intelligence, in the first half of April 1946 at least 400 armed supporters of independence arrived in Bali from East Java, to oppose the approximately 2,000 Dutch troops who had landed on 2 and 3 March 1946.

== Military operations against the Dutch ==
=== Consolidation of anti-Dutch forces ===
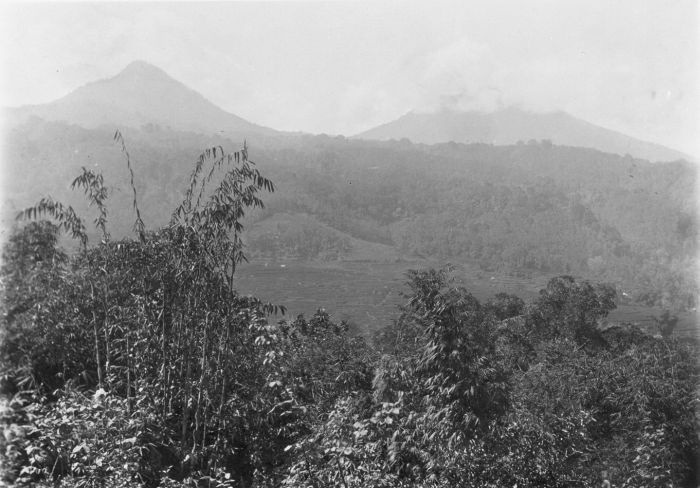
The area around Munduk Malang, where the main base of Ngurah Rai's militia was located in April–May 1946

By the time Ngurah Rai returned to Bali, most of the remaining fighters of his regiment were encamped in the mountainous area near the settlement of Munduk Malang in the central part of the island, on the border between Tabanan and Gianyar regencies. He went there after landing, accompanied by a small part of "M Force". The remaining fighters of "M Force" were divided into several groups, which moved to other parts of the island to conduct reconnaissance and organise guerrilla activity.

Rai and his detachment moved covertly and with great caution, so the journey to Munduk Malang took almost two weeks. During this period, the situation on the island became still more tense, and a series of clashes took place between supporters of independence and Dutch troops. The most significant confrontations occurred on 10 April in Denpasar near the barracks of the Dutch garrison, and on 15 April in the village of Penebel in Tabanan Regency, where a republican detachment attacked a police post.

Arriving at Munduk Malang on 16 April, Ngurah Rai ordered his fighters to refrain from armed clashes with the Dutch. Following a directive from the supreme command, he concentrated his efforts on uniting the forces of Balinese supporters of independence. On his first day at Munduk Malang, he met the leaders of the two main republican groups active on the island, who had arrived there: the local branches of the organisations Youth of the Republic of Indonesia (PRI) and Indonesian Socialist Youth (Pesindo), each of which had its own combat detachments. Following the meeting between Rai and the youth leaders, the creation of a unified political body was proclaimed: the Indonesian People's Struggle Council of the Lesser Sunda Islands (Indonesian: Dewan Perjuangan Rakyat Indonesia Sunda Kecil), which also became known in Bali by the shortened name "Struggle Council". A Joint Headquarters (Indonesian: Markas Besar Umum) was formed as the Council's military command body. Ngurah Rai was elected chairman of the Council and, at the same time, head of the Joint Headquarters. This combination of posts allowed him to concentrate under his authority the leadership of all military and civilian formations of the Balinese republicans.

Using his expanded authority, Rai ordered almost all the forces under his control to be drawn to Munduk Malang. It was decided to leave only six very small detachments in the other parts of the island. In addition, most of the fighters of "M Force", which had arrived from Java, continued to operate outside the main base at Munduk Malang. By the end of May 1946, Ngurah Rai had managed to gather about 1,500 people in the camp near Munduk Malang, some of whom were women and adolescents. The great majority had no combat experience or military training, and firearms were available to no more than half of the fighters. There were several Japanese mortars and heavy machine guns, but ammunition stocks were limited. Not all members of the Joint Headquarters supported Rai's idea of creating such a large guerrilla formation. Many proposed dividing the available forces into small detachments that could operate with greater mobility and secrecy under guerrilla conditions. However, there were no breaches of the principle of unity of command: Ngurah Rai's authority was recognised unconditionally, and his orders were duly carried out.

At the same time, Rai continued to maintain active contacts with representatives of the Balinese feudal nobility, coordinating with them on tactics toward the Dutch. He is known to have persuaded some of his acquaintances who sympathised with the republican movement to accept posts in the administrative structures being created by the colonial authorities, so that they could later provide covert assistance to the independence fighters.

=== The Long March to Mount Agung ===
The Dutch monitored Ngurah Rai's mobilisation activity and set up several military posts near his base at Munduk Malang, but also refrained from military action. Moreover, the command of the "Red Elephant", which included many officers who had personally known Rai from his pre-war service in Prajoda, including the contingent commander himself, Lieutenant Colonel ter Meulen, hoped to persuade the republican commander to abandon the confrontation. On 13 May 1946, a staff officer of the "Red Elephant", Captain J. B. T. Konig, one of the two officers whom Rai had helped to cross from Japanese-attacked Bali to Java in February 1942, sent him, both personally and on behalf of the contingent commander, a courteous and respectful message urging him to enter into negotiations.

Denpasar, 13 May 1946

High-born (Note: By using this form of address, the Dutch officer referred to Rai's aristocratic background.) Rai,

We, Lieutenant Colonel ter Meulen and I (you certainly remember us), are well aware of the reasons that compelled you to lead a unit of the People's Security Army. We would very much like to speak with you. Please try to make contact with Captain Cassa near the village of Plaga; later, we could speak there. After our talks, you may make any decision at your own discretion.

J. B. T. Konig,

Captain of the land forces

Rai's reply, which soon reached the Dutch, was addressed solely to ter Meulen. The partisan commander's message entered the annals of Indonesian history under the name "Sacred Letter" and is widely popularised as an expression of courage and patriotism.

18 May 1946

To the honourable Lieutenant Colonel Ter Meulen

in Denpasar

FREEDOM! (Note: "Freedom!" (Indonesian: Merdeka!) was the traditional greeting of participants in the Indonesian struggle for independence in 1945–1949.)

Your letter has been safely received by us. Briefly, we give the following reply:

The question of security in Bali is our affair. Since the landing of your troops, the island has become insecure. The proof of this is already clear and can no longer be denied. Look, the suffering of the people is worsening. The safety of the people is threatened. In addition, economic disorder is tightening around the people's neck like a noose.

Security is threatened because you have violated the will of the people, who have already very clearly proclaimed their independence.

The question of negotiations we leave to the competence of our leaders in Java. Bali is not the place for diplomatic negotiations. And I do not compromise. In the name of the people, I stand for the departure of the Dutch from the island of Bali. Otherwise, we are able and promise to continue fighting until our aims are achieved.

As long as you remain in Bali, the island of Bali will remain a vessel of bloody battles between us and your side. That is all. Please take note.

Once free, forever free. (Note: "Once free, forever free" (Indonesian: Sekali merdeka, tetap merdeka) was one of the most popular slogans of the Indonesian independence fighters of 1945–1949.)

On behalf of the Bali Struggle Council

Leader:

I Gusti Ngurah Rai (Note: The original text of the letter, written in Indonesian, which was not Rai's native language, is reproduced here. Indonesian official sources also contain a slightly edited version. The translation follows the stylistic and grammatical features of the original as closely as possible, with only obvious typographical errors corrected.)

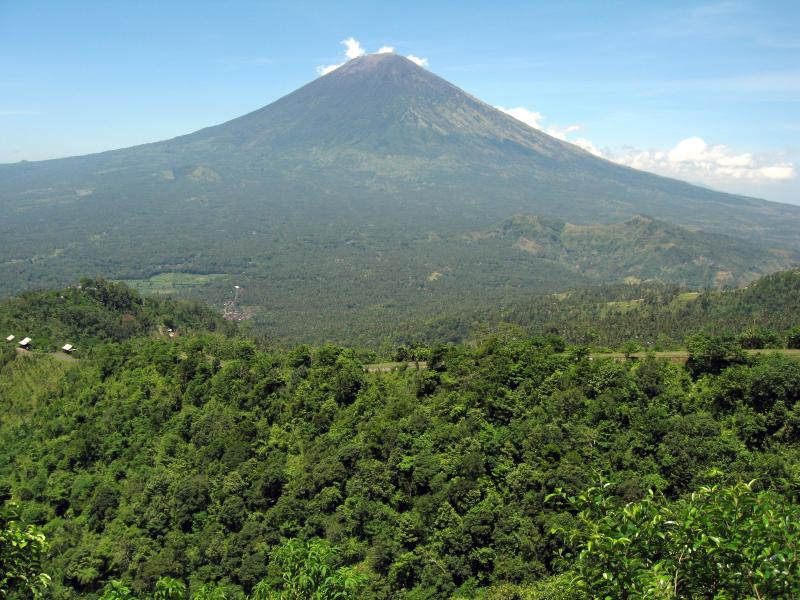
The western slope of Mount Agung, the area to which Ngurah Rai's militia was redeployed

In late May, the commander of "M Force", Captain Markadi, arrived at Munduk Malang with a group of 25 of his fighters and, citing a recent report from the general staff, informed Ngurah Rai of a planned large-scale landing of Indonesian troops on the western coast of Bali. On 1 June 1946, Rai ordered the entire unit he had formed to move to eastern Bali, to the area of the island's highest mountain, the volcano Mount Agung. The reasoning behind this decision remains unclear. Ngurah Rai did not announce any further plan of action, promising his associates that he would decide according to circumstances during the movement. The most common assumption is that by moving east he intended to draw Dutch attention away from the western part of the island, in order to create favourable conditions for the landing of republican forces from Java announced by Markadi.

The 200-kilometre march of the 1,500-strong detachment through the mountain jungle, which took more than a month and became known in Indonesian historiography as the "Long March to Mount Agung", proved highly difficult from a logistical and organisational standpoint. It was also accompanied by a series of engagements with Dutch troops, the intensity of which gradually increased. At the foot of Mount Agung, Rai's forces were subjected for several days to mortar fire and air strikes, in which the Dutch used B-25 bombers. On reaching the village of Tanah Aron on the western slope of the mountain on 7 June, they entered into battle with enemy units numbering about 200 men.

After the battle, Ngurah Rai held a meeting with members of the staff. The position of the guerrillas was judged to be critical. As a result of combat losses, medical casualties and desertion, the detachment's strength had fallen by almost two-thirds; ammunition and food were running out, and the remaining fighters were close to physical exhaustion. The approaches to the mountain from the west were blocked by Dutch troops. Some of Rai's associates proposed breaking through by force back to central Bali, but he considered the likely losses unacceptable. In these circumstances, he decided to divide the detachment into small groups that could descend from Mount Agung along mountain paths and, bypassing the positions of Dutch units, disperse across the island. This division was carried out two days later on the northern slope of the volcano near the village of Klandis. Most of the guerrillas grouped themselves according to their places of origin and moved toward their home areas. With Ngurah Rai's consent, Captain Markadi decided to transfer "M Force", which had suffered serious losses, back to Java. Through Markadi, Rai sent a report to the general staff in which he described the difficult condition of the guerrilla movement and presented detailed information on the disposition, strength and armament of Dutch troops in Bali.

After the end of the "Long March", about 90 men remained under Rai's direct command. These were the most experienced and reliable fighters, including almost all members of the Balinese guerrilla movement who had received Dutch or Japanese military training, as well as a group of Japanese servicemen. The number of the latter is estimated in various sources at between six and ten men, at least two of whom were officers. This unit was named "Ciung Wanara", after Ciung Wanara, a figure in Sundanese mythology known for courage and justice.

"Ciung Wanara" had no more than 50 small arms, five mortars, one mounted machine gun and three light machine guns, with only minimal ammunition. Because of the limited arsenal, Ngurah Rai preferred to avoid clashes with the Dutch until he received instructions from the general staff. The Dutch also refrained from the use of force, and by early August 1946 the situation in Bali had become relatively calm. In October, an additional stabilising factor was the ceasefire between Indonesian and Dutch forces, declared across the entire theatre of operations. After this, representatives of the two governments entered into negotiations under British mediation, aimed at a peaceful settlement of the conflict.

On 15 November 1946, the Linggadjati Agreement was signed in Java. Under the agreement, the Netherlands recognised the de facto sovereignty of the Republic of Indonesia over Java, Sumatra and Madura. In the rest of the former colony, a number of quasi-independent states were to be created with the support of The Hague, which, together with the Republic of Indonesia, would form the United States of Indonesia, a federal entity that would possess state sovereignty while remaining in a form of union with the Netherlands. Bali was included in one of these states, the State of East Indonesia.

=== Last battle and death ===
Disappointed by the terms of the Linggadjati Agreement, Ngurah Rai decided on his own initiative to continue guerrilla operations, hoping to secure the expulsion of the Dutch from Bali and the island's incorporation into the Republic of Indonesia. His appeal to the fighters of "Ciung Wanara" is known:

Do not falter! The Lesser Sunda Islands must be able to stand on their own. We shall continue the struggle with the means available, even though the centre gives us insufficient attention...

Realising that the arsenal at his disposal was insufficient for active and prolonged guerrilla warfare, Rai decided to seize a quantity of weapons and ammunition from the enemy. The most convenient target for this purpose was considered to be the barracks of the colonial police (Note: The police forces in Bali were staffed almost entirely by the local population and were subordinate to the civil colonial administration.) in Tabanan Regency. Significant stocks of weapons were stored there, and the district police chief, Wagimin, was a secret supporter and informant of the guerrillas. In addition to the 95 fighters of "Ciung Wanara", Rai mobilised at least 300 people from among peasants in nearby villages who sympathised with the guerrillas. These militiamen, who had mainly bladed weapons at their disposal, were assigned an auxiliary role: they were to create the impression that the attackers were more numerous and to provide a tighter encirclement of the barracks being attacked. Rai and his fighters are known to have visited a local Hindu temple before the attack, where they prayed for success. On 18 November 1946, Rai's detachment attacked the Tabanan barracks and, with minimal resistance from the police, seized the weapons and ammunition stored there: 36 carbines, two Bren light machine guns, two submachine guns and 8,000 rounds of ammunition. Wagimin, who played a significant role in the success of the operation, joined "Ciung Wanara".

Having replenished their arsenal and disbanded the auxiliary peasant militia, the guerrillas withdrew to a prepared camp near the village of Marga, located in mountainous terrain about 40 kilometres north of Denpasar. The following day, the "Ciung Wanara" camp was discovered by the Dutch, and a day later, on 20 November, it was attacked with the support of aircraft called in from Makassar, as well as additional infantry units urgently transferred from the island of Lombok.

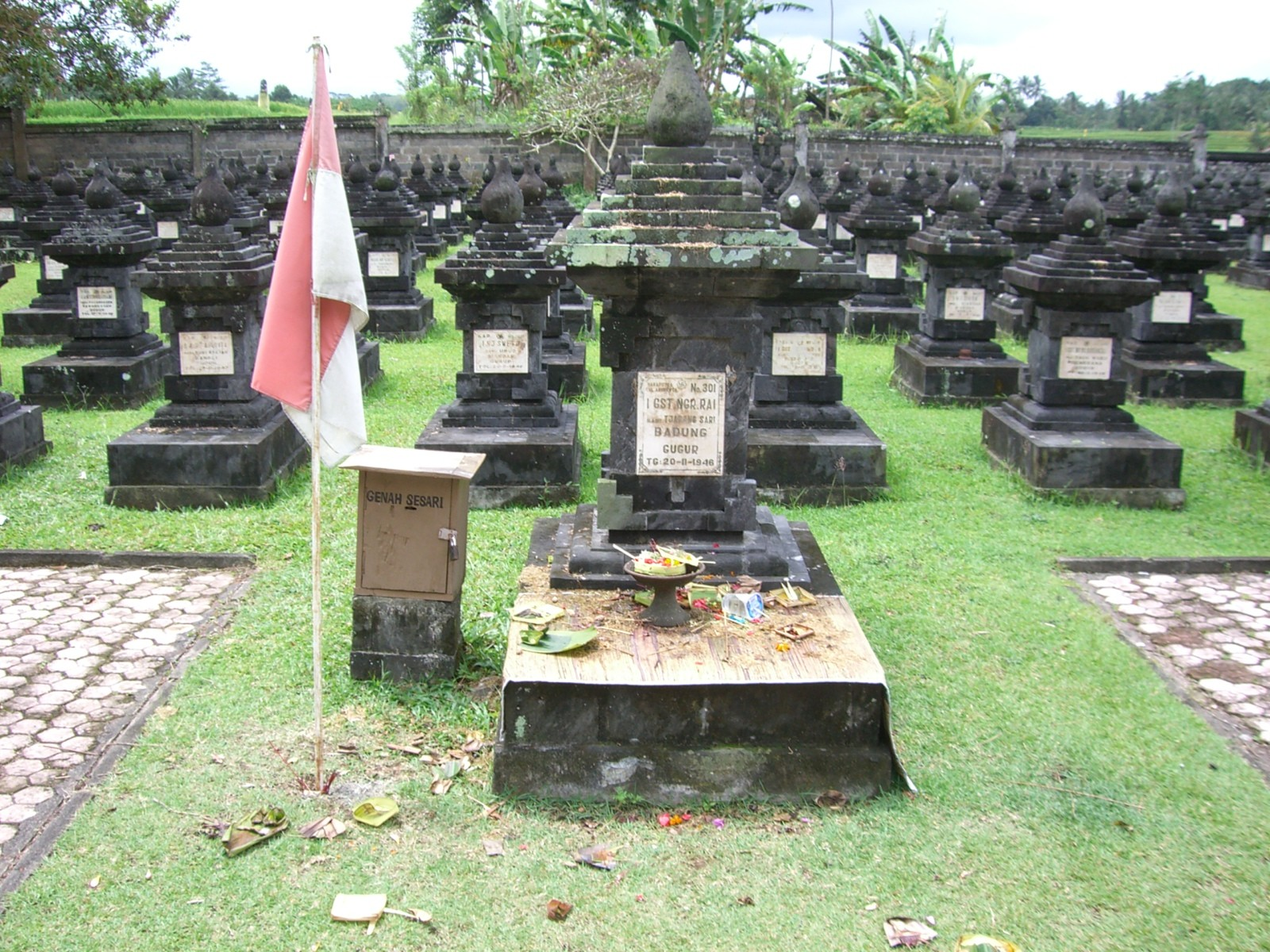
The graves of I Ngurah Rai and his comrades in the memorial complex near the village of Marga, Tabanan

After the first engagement, which took place at around 10:00, the guerrillas, seeking to avoid encirclement, attempted to withdraw from the battlefield in small groups through the corn fields surrounding Marga. These attempts failed, however; the detachment suffered heavy losses and was blocked near a mountain gorge. The Dutch offer of surrender was rejected. The battle is now known as the Battle of Margarana. In the ensuing battle, which lasted from about 14:00 to 17:00, all fighters of "Ciung Wanara", including Ngurah Rai, were killed.

The exact circumstances of Rai's death are not reliably known. Some sources state that he either fell or deliberately jumped from a cliff. In a 2008 interview with local media, one veteran of the Balinese guerrilla movement said that Rai's body, which was brought by the Dutch to Denpasar after the battle, was covered with burns. On this basis, it has been suggested that the commander of "Ciung Wanara" was killed by the nearby explosion of an incendiary bomb dropped from an aircraft.

Despite the absence of reliable evidence concerning Rai's final battle, Indonesian historiography states unequivocally that the leader of the Balinese guerrillas called on his comrades to carry out a puputan, a resistance to the last, ending either in death at the hands of the enemy or in self-inflicted death. Such acts of "suicidal" resistance had previously been carried out by Balinese rulers during the Dutch intervention in Bali in the early 20th century.

Ngurah Rai's body was handed over to the guerrilla commander's family and buried in his native village of Carangsari.

=== Military and political consequences ===
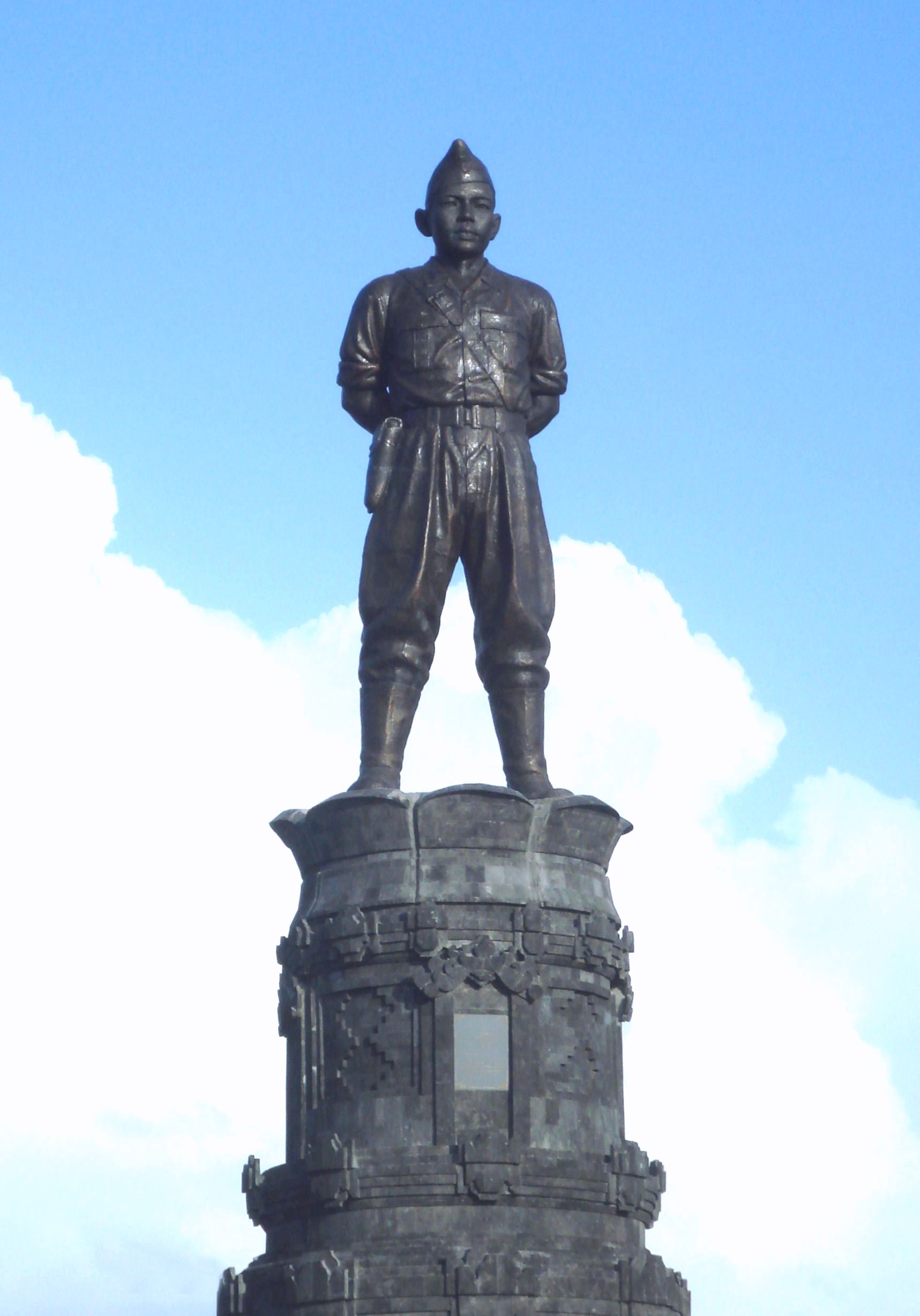
Monument to of I Gusti Ngurah Rai, Bali

Rai's final battle, later given an epic name "Puputan Margarana", became the largest armed clash during the war of independence in Bali. Its outcome had a major impact on the subsequent course of the national liberation movement on the island. The deaths of Rai and his closest comrades contributed to a sharp rise in anti-Dutch sentiment among the Balinese. At the same time, the military capacity of the independence supporters was gravely weakened: after the loss of "Ciung Wanara", almost no professionally trained military personnel remained among the guerrillas, and the independence fighters' arsenals had been depleted. Because Ngurah Rai's entire force was wiped out, including the military leadership, the Dutch forces were subsequently unopposed and were able to regain control of Bali.

At an emergency meeting of the Struggle Council, held on the second day after Ngurah Rai's death, his successor was chosen: Made Widja Kusuma, the 23-year-old leader of the Youth of the Republic of Indonesia group, who had no military education. Other leadership positions left vacant after the deaths of Rai's comrades were also filled by civilians, mainly representatives of youth organisations. Lacking the forces, resources and skills required to continue military confrontation with the Dutch, the new leadership of the anti-colonial resistance announced a shift to "political methods of struggle", by which it meant primarily agitation and propaganda, as well as the collection of intelligence. As a result, armed clashes in Bali thereafter, until the autumn of 1949, when Dutch troops left the island, were episodic and very limited in scale.

Another consequence of Rai's death was a noticeable change in the social composition of the upper leadership of the anti-Dutch resistance and in its ideological orientation. While representatives of the upper castes of Balinese society had initially formed a substantial part of it, after the loss of Rai and his closest comrades, many of whom, like their commander, came from noble families, the leading role in the republican movement on the island passed to people of non-noble origin. This, in turn, led to the growing popularity of left-wing ideas within the resistance and accelerated its distancing from the Balinese feudal elite.

== Family ==
In 1938, while studying at military school, Ngurah Rai married Desak Putu Kari, a woman from Gianyar who came from a non-noble family and had been born in 1922. The marriage produced three sons: I Gusti Ngurah Yudana (b. 1942), I Gusti Ngurah Tantra (, b. 1944), and I Gusti Ngurah Alit Yudha (b. 1946). Rai never saw his youngest son, as the child was born after Rai had left on his final campaign. Aware of the danger of military confrontation with the Dutch, Ngurah Rai had warned his wife in advance that he was likely to be killed. At their parting, he said:

Consider me already dead. Do not think about when I will return...

After Ngurah Rai led his guerrilla detachment into the jungle, his wife and children were left in extreme hardship. According to Putu Kari's recollections, most of the villagers sympathised with her, but were afraid to help because they feared the Dutch. The Dutch detained the guerrilla commander's family for a time and subjected Putu Kari, who was pregnant with their third son, to harsh interrogation.

Several years after Rai's death, his widow married one of his comrades in the guerrilla movement, Made Setia Budi. She had four more children in her second marriage, and by the end of her life she had 20 grandchildren. Desak Putu Kari died on 10 December 2017. Until her final days, she retained a clear memory, regularly took part in various events held in Ngurah Rai's memory, and was frequently visited by representatives of the mass media, local authorities and the military leadership.

Rai's youngest son, Ngurah Alit Yudha, became a senior functionary of Golkar, headed the party's Bali branch for many years, and served as a member of the People's Representative Council of Indonesia from 1999 to 2004. He also actively participates in events dedicated to Rai's memory.

== Commemoration ==
Ngurah Rai's leadership of the Balinese guerrilla movement and his death began to be heroicised by Indonesian propaganda as early as the late 1940s, as an example of courage, self-sacrifice, loyalty to military duty and devotion to the ideals of the country's struggle for independence. This was not prevented by the fact that, from the standpoint of military art and political expediency, both the march to Mount Agung and Ngurah Rai's final operation were assessed quite critically. Thus, Rai's close associate and successor as head of the Struggle Council, Widja Kusuma, acknowledged many years later that the "Long March" had been one of the greatest failures of the Indonesians during the war of independence. Abdul Haris Nasution, one of Indonesia's leading military figures, who for many years held senior posts in the armed forces and developed a concept of guerrilla warfare that received international recognition, posed a rhetorical question in his memoirs: "Would it not have been better for Lieutenant Colonel Ngurah Rai to follow the principle of guerrilla warfare: hit and run?"

Measures to commemorate Ngurah Rai began to be taken at the national level soon after the end of the war of independence. In 1947, a regiment named after Ngurah Rai was formed within the armed forces. In November 1954, on the seventh anniversary of the battle near the village of Marga, the Taman Pujaan Bangsa Margarana memorial complex, covering more than 25 hectares, was built at the site where Rai and his fighters were killed. It was decided that the remains of all participants in the Balinese guerrilla movement who had died during the war of independence would be buried there. The central element of the memorial was a monument designed in the style of a Javanese Hindu temple: an eight-tiered tower with a pentagonal base, 17 metres high. The height, number of sides and number of tiers symbolise the date of the proclamation of the independence of the Republic of Indonesia: 17.08.1945. Marble slabs bearing the text of Rai's letter to Lieutenant Colonel ter Meulen are installed on the five sides of the tower's base.

On 30 September 1962, Ngurah Rai's remains were ceremonially exhumed and cremated in accordance with Hindu rites. The event was given the character of a major public and political ceremony, for which an organising committee composed of representatives of the central and local authorities had been formed in advance. Members of the Indonesian government and senior military leadership attended the cremation ceremony. Part of Rai's ashes was scattered into the sea near Sanur, while another part was buried in the memorial complex near the village of Marga.

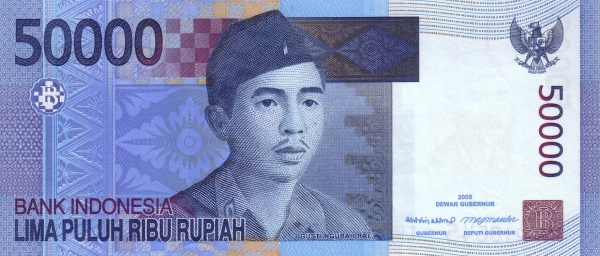
I Gusti Ngurah Rai featured on the 50,000-rupiah banknote issued by Bank Indonesia.

In total, the memorial complex contains 1,372 graves, in which 1,371 people are buried, including 64 regular servicemen of the Indonesian armed forces, 1,296 civilian participants in the guerrilla movement, and 11 Japanese military personnel who went over to the Indonesian side and took part in the anti-Dutch resistance. One headstone was installed in memory of an unknown fighter. All the headstones are of the same type, but Ngurah Rai's headstone is larger and is placed in front of the others, which are arranged in rows. The names of the dead are inscribed on a marble wall located next to the graves. In addition to the burials and the monument, the complex contains a museum on the history of the Balinese guerrilla movement.

In 1954, Ngurah Rai was posthumously promoted to the rank of colonel, and in 1975, by decree of President Suharto (Decree No. 06 of 9 August 1975), he was declared a National Hero of Indonesia. By the same decree, he was again posthumously promoted in rank, to brigadier general, and was also awarded one of the country's highest military orders, the Star of Mahaputera, 4th class. For a long time, Ngurah Rai remained the only Balinese person to receive this title, until in 2007 the title of national hero was also posthumously granted to Ide Anak Agung Gde Agung, a statesman of the 1940s and 1950s.

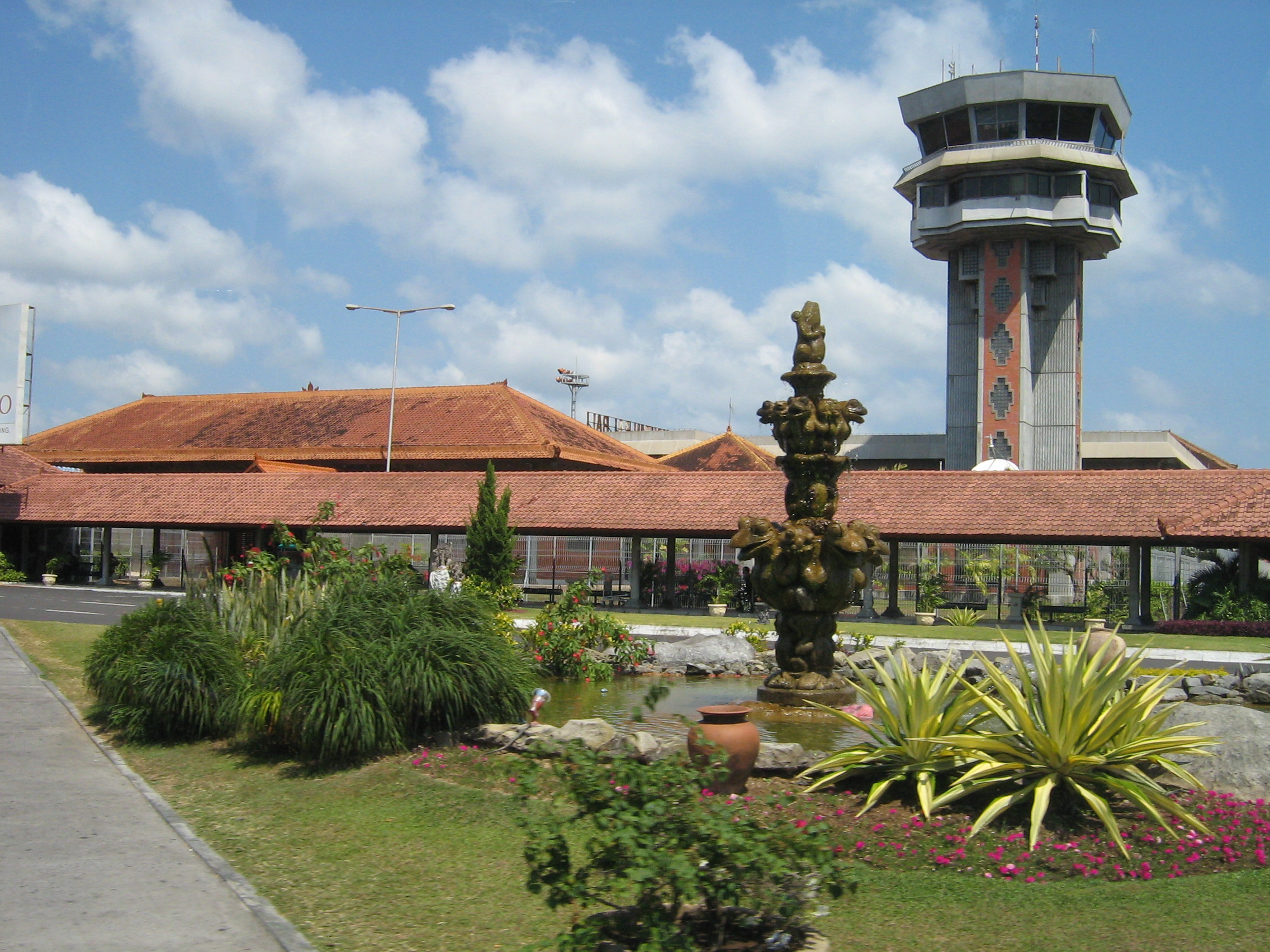
Ngurah Rai International Airport in Denpasar

Named in honour of Ngurah Rai are Bali's international airport, a university and Ngurah Rai Stadium, respectively the largest higher education institution and the largest sporting facility in Bali. Streets in Denpasar and many other Balinese settlements, as well as in several cities outside Bali, including the Indonesian capital, Jakarta, also bear his name. Rai's portrait appeared on two series of Indonesian banknotes with a denomination of 50,000 rupiahs, issued respectively in 2005–2011 and 2011–2016.

Dozens of monuments to Ngurah Rai have been erected in various parts of the island. In Munduk Malang, a museum of the Joint Headquarters of the Indonesian People's Struggle Council of the Lesser Sunda Islands has been established. In Carangsari, Ngurah Rai's native village, however, there is no state memorial or museum; there is only a small monument erected and maintained at the expense of the guerrilla commander's family.

The anniversary of the battle near the village of Marga, as well as Ngurah Rai's birthdays, are solemnly commemorated in Bali. In January 2017, the centenary of the Balinese hero was marked with particular ceremony. A regular element of commemorative ceremonies is the public reading of Rai's letter to Lieutenant Colonel ter Meulen, which is regarded as one of Bali's principal historical relics. The original letter is sometimes carried in a special casket during ceremonial processions from one settlement to another. Public readings of its text are also held on other ceremonial occasions; for example, in March 2014 it was read aloud during a meeting between the President of Indonesia, Susilo Bambang Yudhoyono, and veterans of the Balinese guerrilla movement.

In 2013, with the support of the civil and military authorities of Bali province, a biographical docudrama film, I Gusti Ngurah Rai, was produced. Its premiere took place on 11 July 2013 at the headquarters of the local military district.

On 10 January 2018, the 101st anniversary of Rai's birth, the frigate I Gusti Ngurah Rai was ceremonially commissioned into the Indonesian Navy in Benoa Bay in southern Bali. The frigate had been built by Indonesian shipbuilders in cooperation with their Dutch counterparts, the shipbuilding company Damen Schelde Naval Shipbuilding.

== Notes ==
Explanatory notes

=== Bibliography ===
- Бандиленко, Г. Г.; Гневушева, Е. И.; Деопик, Д. В.; Цыганов, В. А. (1992–1993). История Индонезии: В 2 ч. (in Russian). М.
- Дёмин, Лев Михайлович (1964). Остров Бали (in Russian). М.: Наука. p. 303.
- Robinson, Geoffrey (1998). The Dark Side of Paradise: Political Violence in Bali. Ithaca, New York: Cornell University Press. ISBN 978-0801481727.
- Ide Anak Agung Gde Agung (1996) [1995]. From the Formation of the State of East Indonesia Towards the Establishment of the United States of Indonesia. Translated by Owens, Linda. Jakarta: Yayasan Obor Indonesia. ISBN 979-461-216-2.
- Pringgodigdo, Ag. (1973). Ensiklopedi Umum. Jakarta. ISBN 978-979-413-5228.
- Nyoman Pendit (1979). Bali Berjuang (in Indonesian). Denpasar: Gunung Agung. ISBN 978-979-995-4114.
- Endarmoko, Eko (1993). M.E.M.O.A.R senarai kiprah sejarah: Roeslan Abdulgani, Zulkifli Lubis, M. Natsir, J. Darmojuwono Asrul Sani, Sutan Takdir Alisjahbana, S.K. Trimurti, Sri Paku Alam VIII, Rosihan Anwar (in Indonesian). Jakarta: Pustaka Utama Grafiti. ISBN 978-979-444-2722.
- Santosa, Iwan; Wanhar, Wenri (2012). Pasukan-M: Menang Tak Dibilang, Gugur Tak Dikenang (in Indonesian). Jakarta: R & W Publishing. ISBN 978-979-1008-57-0.
- Sejarah Kebangkitan Nasional Daerah Bali (in Indonesian). Jakarta: Departemen Pendidikan dan Kebudayaan Republik Indonesia. 1984. p. 198.
- Made Sutaba; M. Soenyata Kartadarmadja; I Gusti Bagus Arthanegara; Anak Agung Gede Putra Agung; FX. Soenaryo (1983). Sejarah Perlawanan Terhadap Imperialisme dan Kolonialisme di Daerah Bali (in Indonesian). Jakarta: Direktorat Jenderal Kebudayaan. p. 238.
