= Paul Mayom Akech =

South Sudanese politician

Paul Mayom Akech is a South Sudanese politician. He is the current Minister for Irrigation and Water Resources in the Cabinet of South Sudan. He was appointed to that position on 10 July 2011.

== See also ==
- SPLM
- SPLA
- Cabinet of South Sudan
