= Veronica Nduva =

Kenyan public servant

Veronica Mueni Nduva CBS
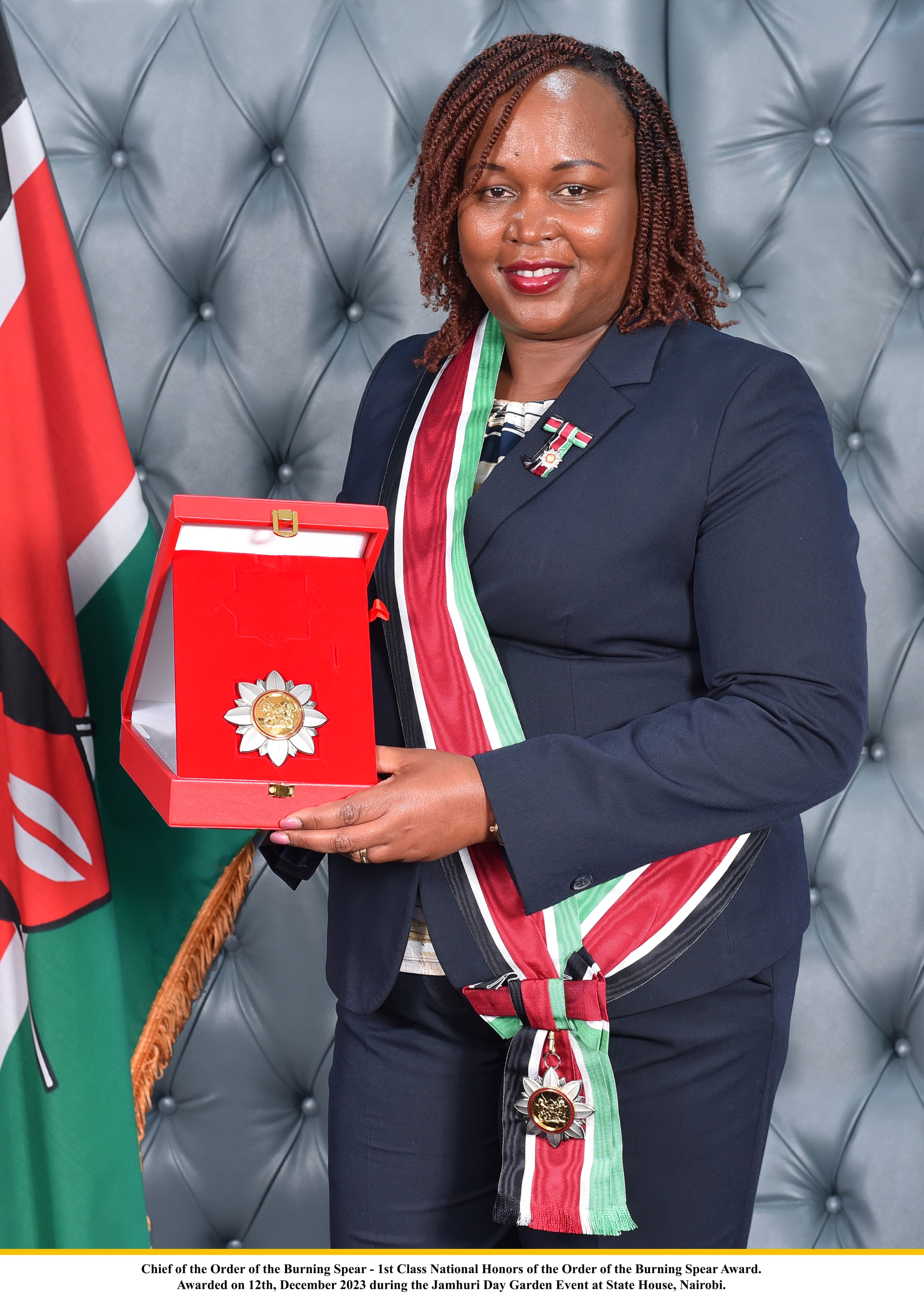
- Chief of the Order of the Burning Spear - Awarded on 12 December 2023 , State House Nairobi

7th Secretary General of the East African Community
- In office 7 June 2024 – April 2026
- Preceded by: Peter Mathuki
- Succeeded by: Stephen Patrick Mbundi

Personal details
- Born: 1976 (age 49–50) Kenya
- Education: State House Girls' High School
- Alma mater: University of Nairobi (BA, MA)

Veronica Mueni Nduva, CBS (born 1976) is a Kenyan public servant who served as the 7th Secretary General of the East African Community (EAC) from June 2024 to April 2026. She was the first woman to hold the position.

She succeeded Peter Mathuki and was sworn into office on 7 June 2024 during the 23rd Extra-Ordinary Meeting of the EAC Heads of State. She was succeeded by Stephen Patrick Mbundi of Tanzania.

Prior to her appointment, Nduva served in senior roles in the Government of Kenya, including Principal Secretary for Gender and Affirmative Action and Principal Secretary for Performance and Delivery Management.

== Early life and education ==
Nduva was born in Kenya in 1976. She attended State House Girls' High School in Nairobi.

She graduated from the University of Nairobi with a Bachelor of Arts in Political Science and Public Administration in 2000. She later obtained a Master of Arts in Communication from the University of Nairobi.

== Career ==
=== Early career ===
Nduva worked in civil society organisations and governance-related roles in Kenya before joining the United States Embassy in Nairobi.

From 2014 to 2022, she served as a Senior Political Specialist and Special Adviser at the United States Embassy in Nairobi.

=== Government of Kenya ===
In November 2022, Nduva was appointed Principal Secretary for the State Department for Gender and Affirmative Action.

In October 2023, she was appointed Principal Secretary for the State Department for Performance and Delivery Management.

=== Secretary General of the East African Community ===
Nduva was appointed Secretary General of the East African Community in June 2024 following the recall of Peter Mathuki.

As Secretary General, she served as the head of the EAC Secretariat and Secretary to the Summit of Heads of State.

Her tenure coincided with financial constraints within the EAC related to delayed contributions from partner states.

Kenya's rotational term ended in 2026, after which she was succeeded by Stephen Patrick Mbundi.

== Publications ==
Nduva has authored and contributed to publications on governance, regional integration, and public policy. Her work includes contributions to the World Economic Forum on digital public infrastructure and regional development.

== Honours ==
- Order of the Chief of the Burning Spear (CBS), First Class — Republic of Kenya, 2023

== See also ==
- East African Community
- Secretary General of the East African Community
- Peter Mathuki

Political offices
Preceded by Peter Mathuki	Secretary General of the East African Community; 2024–2026	Succeeded by Stephen Patrick Mbundi
